= Second Battle of Komárom (1849) =

Battle of the Hungarian War of Independence

Coordinates: 47°44′08.1″N 18°06′19.9″E

- Part of the Hungarian Revolution of 1848
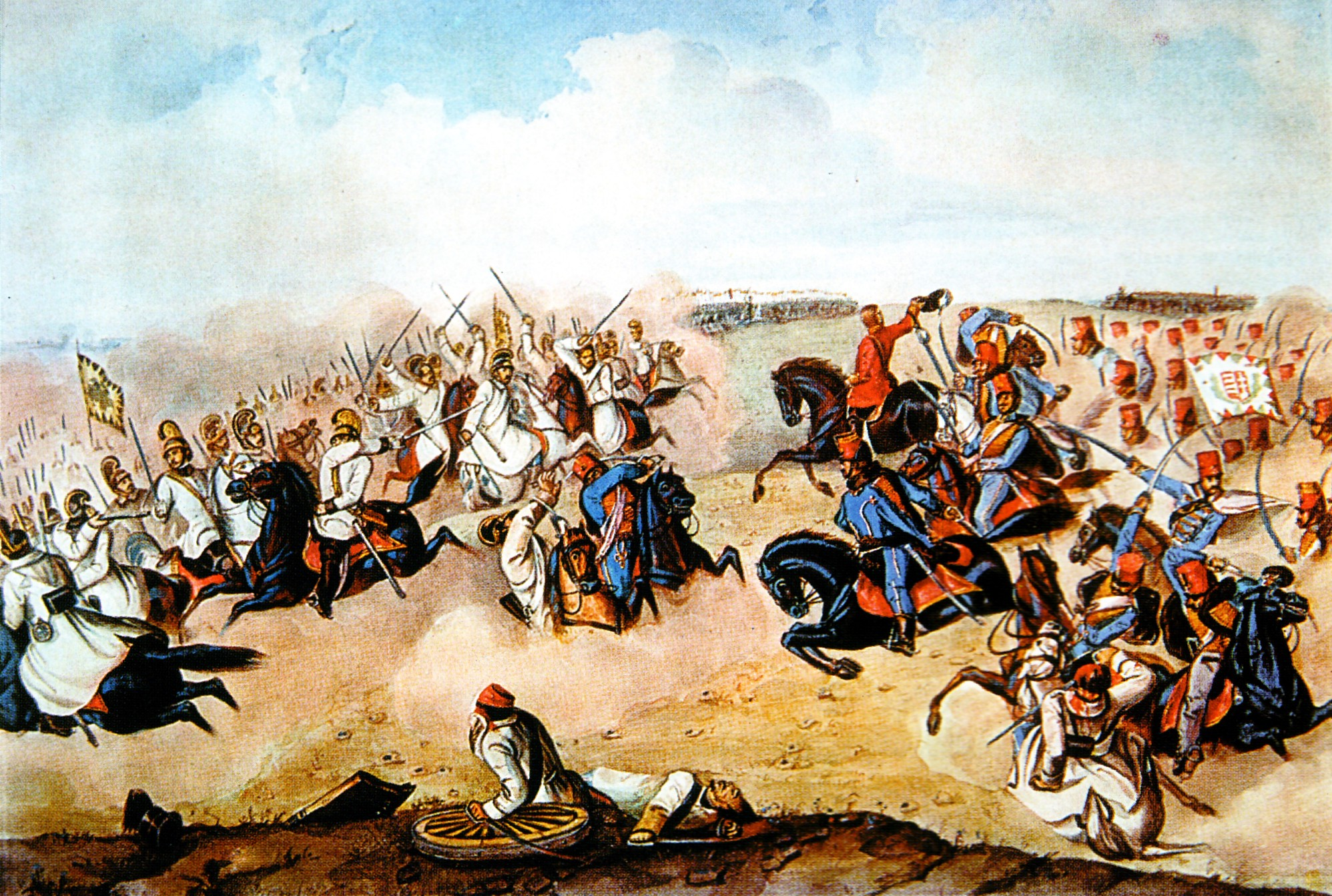
- The Second Battle of Komárom, as painted by Mór Than
| Date | 2 July 1849 |
| Location | Komárom, Kingdom of Hungary |
| Result | Hungarian victory |

Belligerents
| Hungarian Revolutionary Army | Austrian Empire; Russian Empire |

Commanders and leaders
| Artúr Görgei (WIA); György Klapka | Julius Jacob von Haynau; Franz Schlik; Ludwig von Wohlgemuth; Feodor Sergeyevich Panyutyin |

Strength
| Total: 26,884 (27,400) men (191 infantry companies, 38 cavalry companies); II Corps: 5,925; III Corps: 7,766; VII Corps: 10,661; VIII Corps: 2,444; 131 (134) cannons | Total: 52,185 (58,938) men (287 infantry companies, 56 cavalry companies); I Corps: 18,523; Reserve corps: 15,549; Cavalry division: 4,259; Panyutyin division: 11,672; Other units: 2,187; 234 (216) cannons Non-participants: III Corps: 12,558 men 42 cannons |

Casualties and losses
| Total: 1,500 killed and wounded | Total: 890 killed and wounded: • 140 dead; • 588 wounded; • 162 missing or captured |

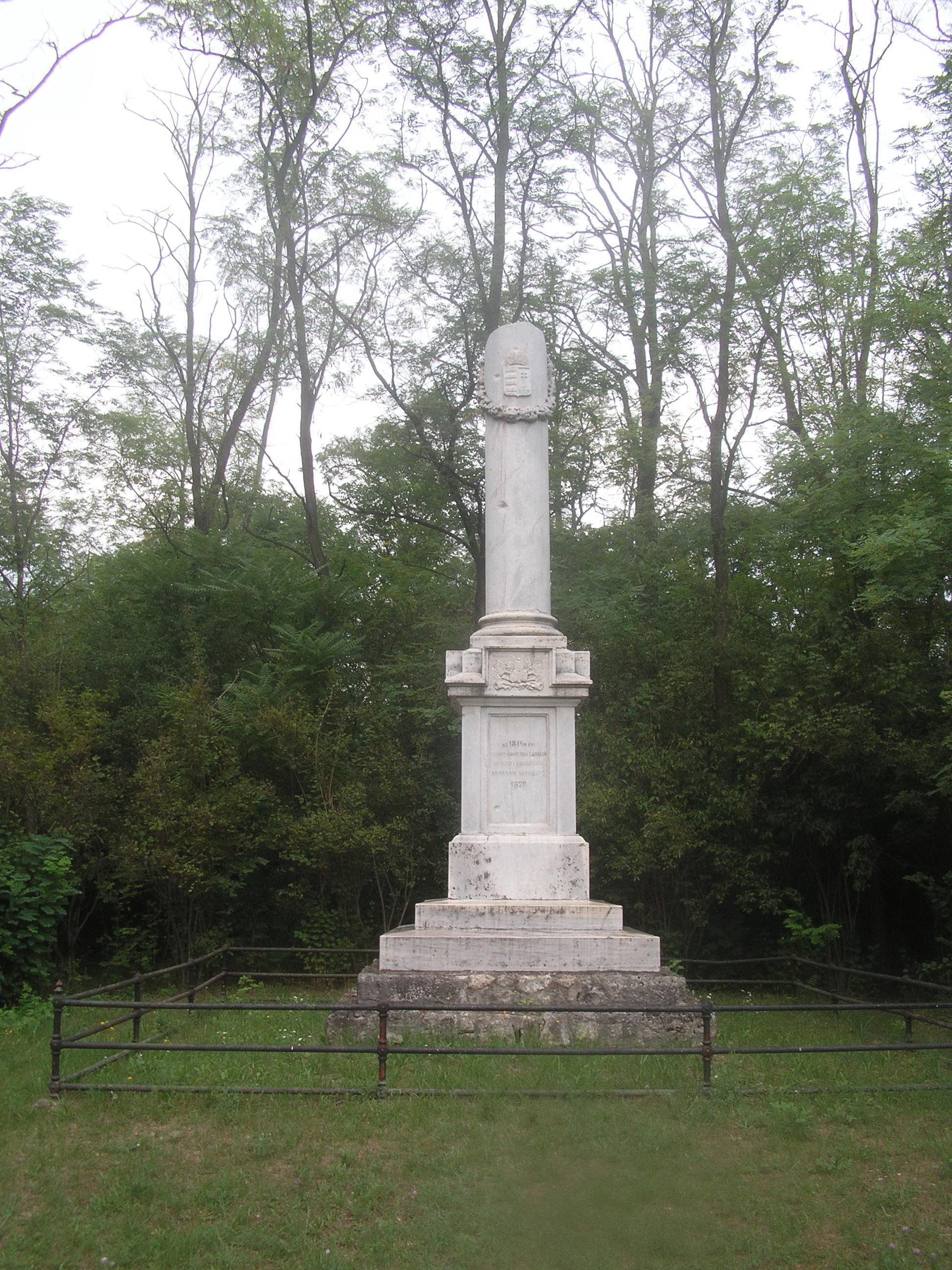
Column commemorating the battle

The Second Battle of Komárom, also known as the Battle of Ács, took place on 2 July 1849 between the Hungarian Revolutionary Army (led by General Artúr Görgei) and the Imperial Austrian Army of the Austrian Empire (led by Supreme Commander Field Marshal Julius von Haynau); a contingent of almost 12,000 Russian Empire troops was led by Lieutenant General Fyodor Sergeyevich Panyutyin. The Austrian army outnumbered the Hungarian troops two to one, and had a multitude of infantry (landwehr, grenadiers, seressaner, and kaiserjägers), light infantry (uhlans, dragoons, cossacks, and chevau-léger), heavy cavalry (cuirassiers), and better weapons. The Hungarians, except for the Landwehr (Hungarian: Honvéd) and the hussars, had few types of military units. Other problems also negatively impacted the Hungarian army. The Lajos Kossuth government decided to withdraw the Hungarian troops from Komárom to southern Hungary without consulting Görgei, the war minister, the only one authorised to make a military decision. Görgei grudgingly agreed to the decision, fixing the date of departure for southern Hungary to 3 July. Uncertainty and conflicts existed among the Hungarian officers and soldiers before the attack. Kossuth sent Lieutenant General Lázár Mészáros to Komárom to relieve Görgei of leadership and send him to Pest. When Mészáros approached Komárom by steamboat on 2 July, however, he heard gunfire from the battle and returned to Pest.

Austrian Supreme Commander Field Marshal Julius Jacob von Haynau planned to force the Hungarian troops to retreat to the fortress of Komárom; Haynau would besiege it from the south, opening the road toward Buda and Pest. After accomplishing this, most of Haynau's troops would advance east and occupy the Hungarian capitals before his allies (the Russian troops led by Ivan Paskevich) arrived. The battle began in the early morning of 2 July with an attack by the imperial I Corps (led by General Franz Schlick) from the direction of Ács, chasing the Hungarians from the Ács forest, pushing them into the fortifications south of Komárom, and capturing the Monostor trenches; this threatened to encircle the Hungarian troops. Görgei did not expect a major attack that day. Foreseeing that he would be dismissed and aware of the political animosity against him, he wrote a letter that night and early morning explaining his military decisions and attributing the military and political problems to Kossuth. Görgei stopped writing when he heard gunfire from the battle. He rushed to the battlefield and found the Hungarian VIII Corps in flight, leaving the fortress's western trenches and some fortifications in Austrian hands. Görgei halted the retreat with grapeshot and volley fire and ordered the troops to regroup and, with the support of II and VII Corps, chase Schlick's troops from the fortifications and the Ács forest. The Hungarian counter-attack, supported from the southern Herkály grange by VII Corps cavalry led by General Ernő Poeltenberg, threatened Schlick's left flank with separation from the rest of the imperial army. The imperial army was saved by the Russian division (led by Lieutenant General Fyodor Panyutyin) and the Austrian I Corps Simbschen-Brigade; Poeltenberg retreated to escape encirclement, stopping the Hungarian advance.

The Austrian IV Corps reserve brigade, led by General Lajos Benedek, occupied Ószőny and opened the route toward Buda and Pest. Hungarian III Corps General György Klapka ordered several counter-attacks to reoccupy the strategic position but, despite initial success, his troops were forced to retreat. Haynau was unaware of the battlefield situation and, believing his troops were victorious, ordered his center (IV Corps) to withdraw; this put his army in danger from a Hungarian attack. Görgei saw the opportunity, and intended to concentrate his cavalry and artillery units in the center. Haynau's brigade commanders (Simbschen, Ludwig, and Lederer) and Panyutyin recognized the danger and closed the gap. Görgei, wanting to retake Ószőny, decided to force the Austrians to send reinforcements from the flanks to the center with a cavalry and artillery attack. Klapka sent the III Corps cavalry to help him, hoping that this would force Benedek to withdraw his troops from Ószőny and send reinforcements to the center. The Hungarian hussar charge was commanded by Görgei and Poeltenberg, repelling Austrian cavalry units. Its artillery (which followed the cavalry) launched cannon fire which struck the Austrian headquarters in Csém from which Franz Joseph I of Austria was observing the battle, forcing Haynau, the headquarters and the emperor to retreat to Bana. The Hungarian cavalry attack, in which 24 hussar companies (3,000 riders) participated – the largest Hungarian cavalry charge of the revolution – achieved its objective, and Klapka recaptured Ószőny. Görgei, leading the hussars, was severely injured in the head by cannon fire. Bleeding, he tried to send orders to his troops until he fainted at the end of the battle.

The reinforced Austrian cavalry and artillery pushed the Hungarian cavalry back until both armies retreated from the battlefield at about 8:00 p.m. The battle may be regarded as a Hungarian victory; Haynau's plans to encircle the Hungarian troops in Komárom and occupy the Hungarian capitals failed, and his troops were forced to retreat from the strategic positions occupied by them during the battle. The destruction of the imperial army was prevented by Haynau's subordinates, who filled its gap before the Hungarian cavalry arrived. The day after the battle, the Hungarian generals learned about Kossuth's removal of Görgei from command; their protests forced the governor-president to allow Görgei to continue leading the Army of the Upper Danube. Görgei fought his way eastward in mid-July through northern Hungary against the five-times-larger Russian army, led by Ivan Paskevich.

== Background ==
=== Retreat to Komárom ===
The Hungarian army retreated to the Komárom fortress, one of the most powerful and modern fortifications of the Habsburg monarchy, after the 1849 Battle of Győr. Colonel József Bayer, Görgei's Hungarian Operational Office chief, and government commissioner János Ludvigh wrote to Lajos Kossuth in Pest about the lost battle. They wrote that the Austrians might soon arrive in the vicinity of the Hungarian capital, and advised him to move with the Bertalan Szemere government to Nagyvárad under the protection of General Józef Bem's army; Görgei wanted to remain at Komárom and lead a decisive attack against the Austrians before the arrival of the Russian army. Kossuth did not initially want to leave Pest, telling Bayer that the government would leave the capitals only with the Hungarian army. Görgei wrote to Kossuth on 30 June, summarizing his plans: "For our nearest future I have a simple operational plan: here, under the protection of Komárom['s walls] to concentrate all our forces, except Bem's, Vetter's and [Lajos] Kazinczy's [troops], and to attack the Austrians decisively."

=== Görgei's plan ===
Görgei planned to put all his eggs in one basket because the military situation, and Hungary's fate, were in grave danger. Because Austria asked from Tsar Nicholas I of Russia for help in mid-June 1849, Hungary was invaded by a Russian army of 200,000 soldiers – which, combined with 170,000 Austrian soldiers already in Hungary, outnumbered the 170,000 Hungarian soldiers. The Russians also put 80,000 soldiers on standby near the Carpathian Mountains to intervene if necessary. There were tens of thousands of Romanian insurgents in the Western Carpathians of Transylvania, in addition to Serbian insurgents and Croatian troops from Délvidék and Syrmia. The Austro-Russian troops had superior weaponry, and the Hungarians had shortages of weapons and ammunition. Among rifles used by the Hungarians were flintlocks, hunting and ceremonial rifles, percussion rifles and muskets. The Austrian armies had 1,354 cannons, compared with the Hungarians' 857.

At the end of June 1849, Hungary's military situation worsened. Russian troops led by Field Marshal Ivan Paskevich, who had come from the north on 15 June, were approaching Debrecen; south-eastern and eastern Transylvania was invaded by two Austrian armies led by General Alexander von Lüders. In southern Hungary, Austrian and Croatian troops led by Lieutenant Field Marshal Josip Jelačić were advancing towards Szeged; the main Austrian army, led by Julius Jacob von Haynau and reinforced by a Russian division commanded by Lieutenant General Feodor Sergeyevich Panyutyin from the west, pushed Görgei's troops towards Komárom. The Hungarian political and military leaders came to believe that victory was impossible, and the only solution was a compromise. The army's role was to buy time, with successful military operations, for Hungarian politicians to bring the emperor to the negotiating table.

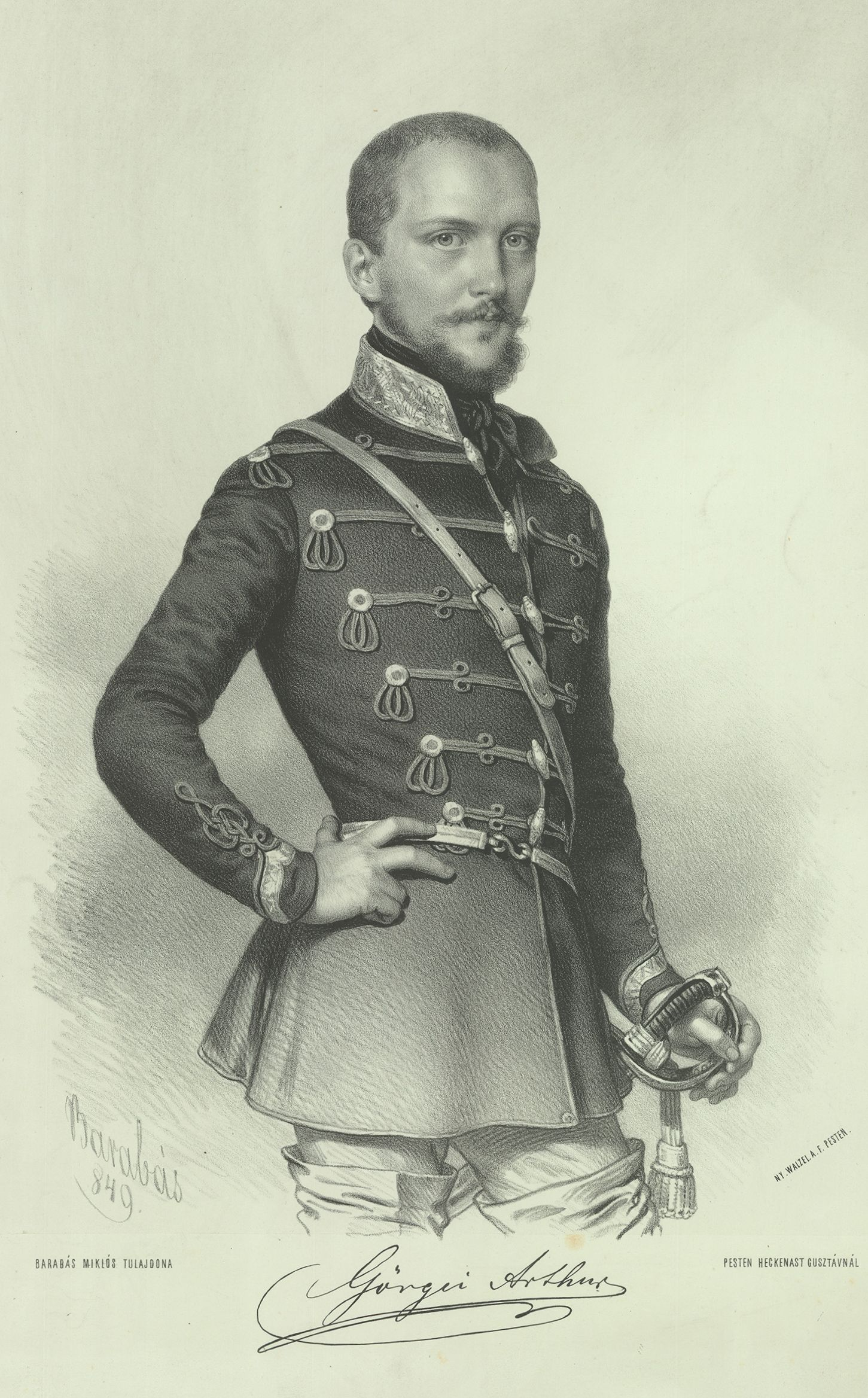
Artúr Görgei lithography by Miklós Barabás

Görgei also believed that it would be impossible to defeat such powerful enemies; the only chance to salvage some Hungarian independence would be to decisively defeat the Austrian troops led by Haynau before the arrival of the Russian forces in the Hungarian capitals and Komárom. He hoped that by commanding a concentrated Hungarian force, he could force the Habsburgs to forge an agreement with Hungary instead of relying on Russian troops to defeat the Hungarians; this would diminish Austrian prestige in Europe. Görgei hoped that if he defeated the Austrian army, the Habsburgs would accept the 1848 Hungarian April Laws (revoked the following year by Franz Joseph I in the March Constitution); Hungary would renounce its 14 April 1849 Declaration of Independence, recognizing Franz Joseph as the Hungarian king. Under Paskevich's command since mid-June, the main Russian army of 120,000 soldiers advanced south in northern Hungary. Only the 8,000-man Hungarian IX Corps, under General Józef Wysocki, tried to stop them. From Transylvania, Józef Bem reported that Russian troops had also invaded the province.

==== Proposal to the government ====
Görgei, the Hungarian army's main commander and minister of war, discussed the military situation with the Hungarian government on 24 June after his defeat in the Battle of Győr. He blamed his subordinates for defeats around the Vág, their inaccurate reconnaissance, and the intervention of Russian troops at Győr and in the Battle of Pered, and believed that he could impose his will on the Austrians with a decisive attack against Haynau's army. On 25 June, the Hungarian government received news from General Józef Wysocki about Russian intervention in northern Hungary. The following day, the Council of Ministers reassembled in Budapest to discuss the situation and determine a strategy. Görgei, realizing that the Hungarian army was not powerful enough to fight on several fronts, proposed to gather it into two major groups. One, with troops from Bácska and Bánság, the Transylvanian Army (led by General Józef Bem) and Colonel Kazinczy Lajos' division, mobilized in eastern Hungary to defend the Tisza River; its headquarters was in Nagyvárad. The other group, led by Görgei as the main army, remained around Komárom. It consisted of the I, II, III and VII Corps, VIII Corps brigades to defend the Komárom fortress, György Kmety's division, and columns led by Ármin Görgey, János Horváth and Lajos Beniczky; Wysocki's IX Corps would hinder a Russian advance from the north. Görgei asked Kossuth to come, with the Szemere government, to Komárom under the protection of his army. Kossuth refused, but the Council of Ministers accepted Görgei's plans to concentrate the armies in two major groups and attack the Austrian army. Hungarian historian Tamás Csikány writes that Kossuth's refusal to go to Komárom was wrong; his visit to the Hungarian troops, given his popularity, would have lifted morale. Franz Joseph I visited Haynau's troops. Görgei then left Budapest for the front after learning about Austrian preparations to attack Győr.

==== Council of Ministers disputes ====
Görgei arrived in Győr on 28 June, near the end of the battle, and saw the overwhelming Austrian superiority (69,350 Austrians versus 17,480 Hungarians). He ordered a retreat, which was also carried out by General Ernő Poeltenberg.

On 27 June, Wysocki sent a letter indicating his inability to hold his line against the Russian army and the need to retreat. News about the defeat at Győr arrived in Budapest two days later. Görgei wrote a letter after the battle saying that the government "is weak, and without defense in Budapest", advising them to leave the capital and move east under the protection of Bem's army, retaining the plan for his army to remain at Komárom and defeat the Austrians. Kossuth summoned the Council of Ministers, which decided – in Görgei's absence – to retreat from Komárom and concentrate under Józef Bem in south-eastern Hungary. Szeged would be the government's new headquarters, leaving only 15,000 soldiers in Komárom. Kossuth believed that Lieutenant-General Bem could defeat the Russian armies which had invaded Transylvania; Lieutenant-General Antal Vetter would defeat Josip Jelačić's troops in southern Hungary, and both armies would come northwards to defeat Paskevich's Russian army.

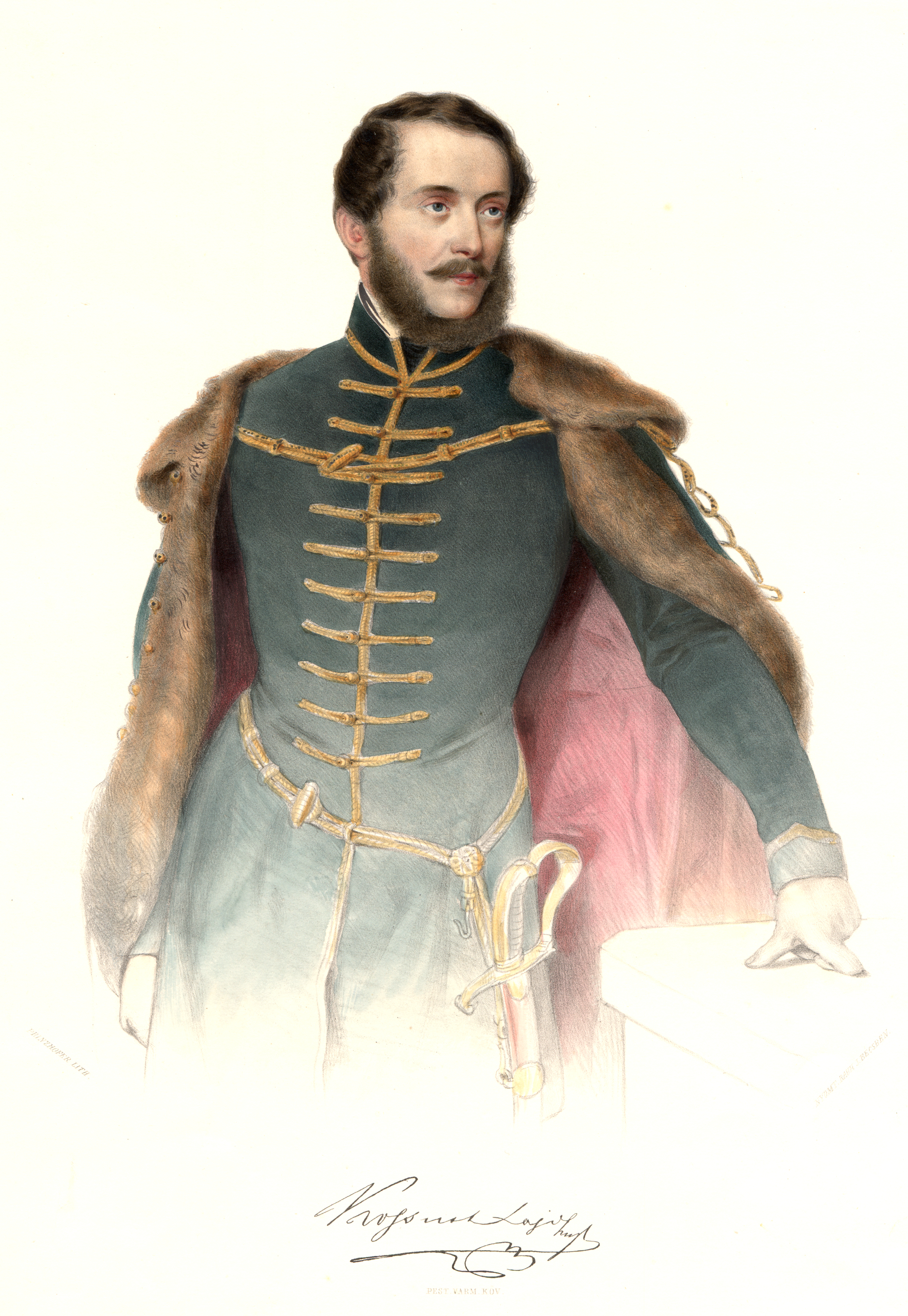
Kossuth Lajos színezett litográfia 1848 Prinzhofer

According to Hungarian historians Róbert Hermann and Tamás Csikány, Kossuth was wrong and should have stuck to Görgei's plan. Csikány writes that the plan to retreat from Komárom meant surrendering the more-developed part of Hungary to the Austrians, enabling them to unite their forces. Its main purpose was to remove Görgei, who was envied by Kossuth and other political and military leaders. Hermann believes that Görgei's plan was correct because Komárom was one of the Habsburg Monarchy's best fortifications, and Haynau's troops could not move toward Budapest until it was unoccupied or neutralized; an army garrisoned in Komárom could attack Vienna. Troops in Komárom could supply themselves from the rich Danube region and be moved on the Szolnok-Pest-Vác railroad, Hungary's only railroad at the time.

The Council of Ministers decision contravened Görgei's plan for dual troop concentrations, and he was ordered to retreat from Komárom to south-eastern Hungary. Their plan was made by Lieutenant-General Henryk Dembiński, a rival, although Görgei was Minister of War and head of the army. Kossuth, the politicians and his officers knew that this could enrage Görgei; Kossuth decided to convey the decision by three carefully-chosen people: Görgei's old friend General Lajos Aulich, Minister of Public Works and Transport László Csány (respected by Görgei) and Lieutenant-General Ernő Kiss, Görgei's superior and authorized by Kossuth to take over leadership of the army and lead it to southern Hungary.

After meeting with the delegation from Budapest and a discussion with József Bayer, Görgei said that the Council of Ministers plan was wrong; the region had no food resources due to months of fighting, and the two south Hungarian strongholds (Temesvár and Arad) were in Austrian hands. However, Görgei sent Kossuth a letter agreeing to retreat from Komárom toward south Hungary on 3 July after assembling his troops (which would take several days). Before the arrival of the Council of Ministers delegation with the order to retreat from Komárom, Görgei sent a letter to Kossuth about remaining in the fortress and criticized the government's proposed scorched earth policy: "I never fought for the government, but for the people, and if today I was convinced that the people would feel better, I would be the first to put my weapons down". This letter was accidentally given to Kossuth after he read Görgei's letter agreeing to obey the Council of Ministers order. As a result of the misunderstanding, Kossuth replaced Görgei with Lieutenant General Lázár Mészáros as army leader and summoned him to Budapest as war minister. Neither Görgei nor his officers learned about this until after the battle, because Mészáros retreated to Budapest when he heard cannon fire from Dunaalmás.

After the Austrian victory at Győr on 28 June, Haynau gave the order to move toward Komárom. I Corps moved toward Lovad and Ács, IV Corps toward Nagyigmánd, III Corps toward Csép and Kisbér, the Bechtold cavalry division toward Bábolna, and the Russian Panyutyin decision toward Bana two days later.

== Battlefield ==
=== Fortifications ===
Komárom and its surroundings were strategically important. It was a favourable crossing point of the Danube and the Vág, which could be easily defended since Komárom's fort system was a modern, important Habsburg Monarchy stronghold. The most important elements of the Komárom fort system were the Old and the New Castles on the east edges of Csallóköz (on the Danube); temporary defensive elements primarily occupied the future battlefield, with only the Star Trench (Csillagsánc) a stone bridgehead fort.

During the summer of 1849, a fortified encampment relying on the Star Trench was built around Újszőny. On 28 May, Komárom commander György Klapka ordered the construction of Sandberg (Sand Mountain): a fortress with casemates at Monostor to defend the fortified encampment from attacks from the west and to control the road from Ács and Danube traffic. Sandberg was the encampment's first fortress to be built, and its defenders were protected by three earthen ramparts 300-400 paces in front of it. The ramparts were quadrilateral wedges, their sides open facing the fortress. Earthen parapets were reinforced with piles, and trenches were dug in front. Trees were felled and houses demolished to prevent attackers from using them for cover. Although the trenches and fortresses were unfinished when the battle began, the Hungarians did their best to make them difficult to breach. Two more fortresses were south, towards the Ács road, and earthworks with cannons were across the road. The second to sixth fortresses were triangular, made of earth and wood; the seventh fortress was horn-shaped and enabled the positioning of more cannons for suppressive fire towards the Herkály grange and other vulnerable positions.

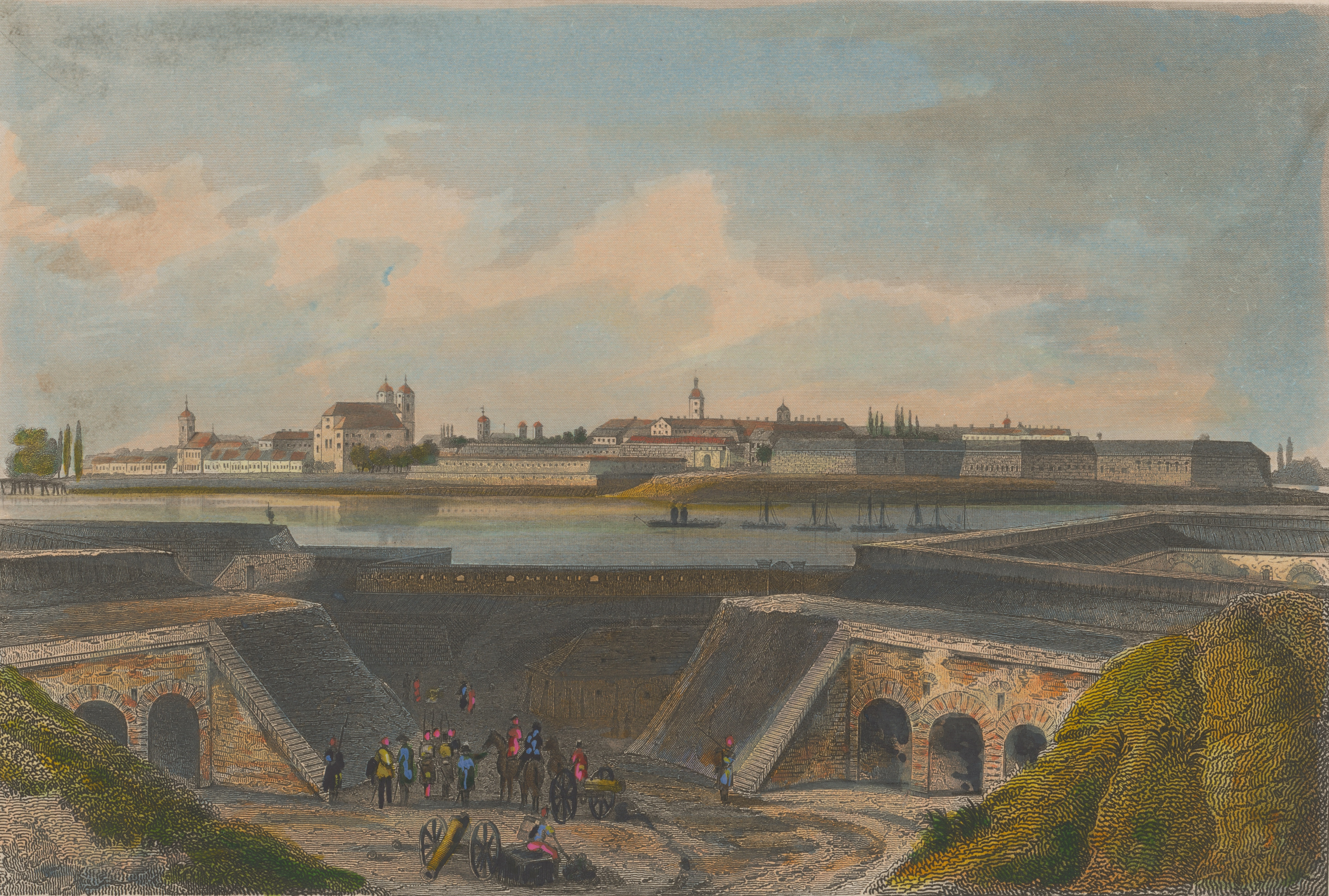
View of Komárom from the Star Trench

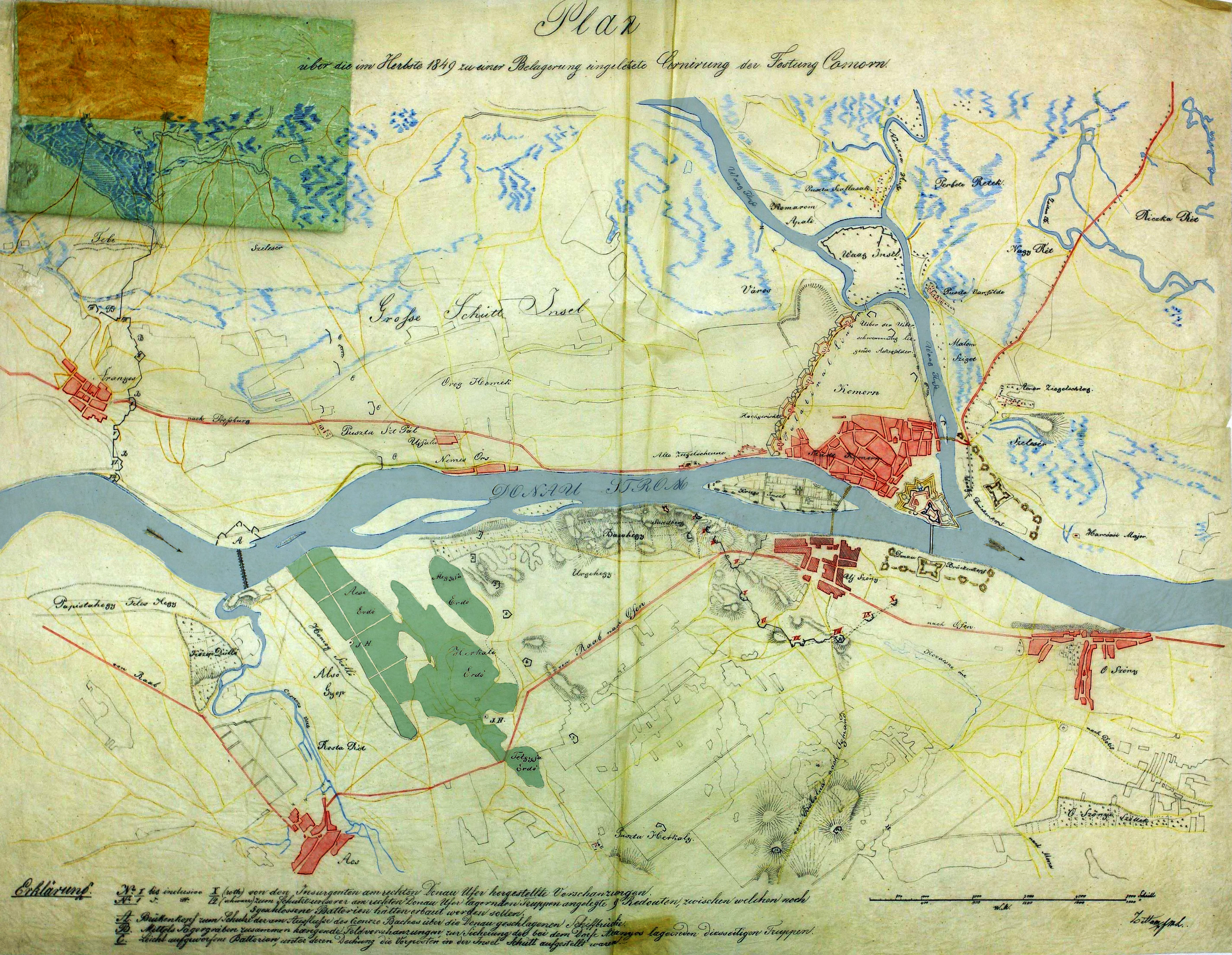
Map about Komárom and the battlefield of 1849. Red: localities and buildings, Blue: rivers and waters, Green: the Ács forest

The eighth fortress, which defended the west portion of the camp and the road from Nagyigmánd, was on high ground at the southern point of the encampment and had a log cabin for its guards. The encampment was defended on the east by the stone Star Trench, which was surrounded by three trenches. The fortresses nr. 9 and 10., similar in shape to the eighth, ended the ring of fortresses around the encampment, relying on the Star Trench, which secured the bridge over the Danube.

Connected, gated barriers were built between the fortresses. The encampment could be accessed via a pontoon bridge behind the Star Trench, and a cannon-protected bridge over the Hadi-Island (Erzsébet sziget/Alžbetin Ostrov/Elisabeth island on the Southern part of the city, today part of Slovakia). A total of 62 cannons protected the encampment (including four 24- and six 18-pound cannons and eight 10-pound howitzers), but the number at each defensive position is unknown.

The relatively-flat ground around the encampment was suitable for a battle; it was partially undulating, with rolling hills. Although the Ács forest was the only wooded area, the low hills enabled troops (including cavalry) to move undetected. The entire battlefield could be observed from two points: a 133.5-metre (438 ft) hill 1 km (0.62 mi) west of the Ószőny vineyards, and a 139.8-metre (459 ft) hill south-west of the Herkály grange. Both played crucial roles in the battle. The ground was sandy, and dust helped commanders detect troop movements in dry, sunny weather. Although it rained on 1 July, during the battle the weather was sunny and hot (enabling dust to be visible). The battleground south of the entrenchment was suitable for troop movements, facilitated by a network of cobblestone roads. The only significant obstacles were the Ács forest and the Concó. The size of the battlefield – 13.35 km (8.30 mi) – was the greatest problem for the troops.

=== Ács forest ===
The Ács forest stretched between Komárom in the north and Ács in the south. It was 200 to 300 metres (660 to 980 ft) above sea level, with a slightly undulating surface. It was bordered on the north by the Danube, on the west by the Concó, on the east by vineyards, and on the south by the Herkály grange. The forest was 3–3.5 km (1.9–2.2 mi) from north to south, and was easy to cross on a network of roads. It had clearings and thick oak-tree growth; in portions of the forest, it was impossible to see more than 30 to 50 paces ahead. East of the Ács forest was an open field and the Cherry Forest (Meggyfa-erdő), 1 km (0.62 mi) long and 0.5 km (0.31 mi) wide, followed by Komárom's defenses.

=== Ószőny ===
Ószőny was a market town east of Komárom's defensive system. It had a population of 1,754 inhabitants, a castle belonging to the Zichy family, a granary, a guest house, a brewery and a toll bridge. The town was crossed by the Buda-Vienna road, a trade and war route; other routes from Tata and the south crossed the town. Although Ószőny was surrounded by marshes and the Szila creek flowed into the Danube west of the town, it was accessible by road. The Star Trench cannons could only reach Ószőny's western boundary, but grenades launched from Komárom's eastern defenses could reach the center of town.

=== Herkály grange ===
The Herkály grange was near the village of Herkály, 4 km (2.5 mi) from the Komárom trenches. A ridge overlooking the battlefield, wide enough for several brigades and batteries, was south-east of the village. Although the ridge protected following troops, it was easy to climb. The larger Csém grange was 1.5 km (0.93 mi) south.

== Armies ==
Róbert Hermann and Tamás Csikány have estimated the armies' composition. The Austrian army is Hermann's estimate.

=== Austrian troops ===
- I Corps: 119 infantry companies and 16 cavalry squadrons (18,523 men, 2,340 horses and 54 cannons), led by Lieutenant-General Franz Schlik
- III Corps: 65 infantry companies and 14 cavalry squadrons (12,558 men, 2,338 horses and 42 cannons), led by Lieutenant-General Georg Heinrich von Ramberg

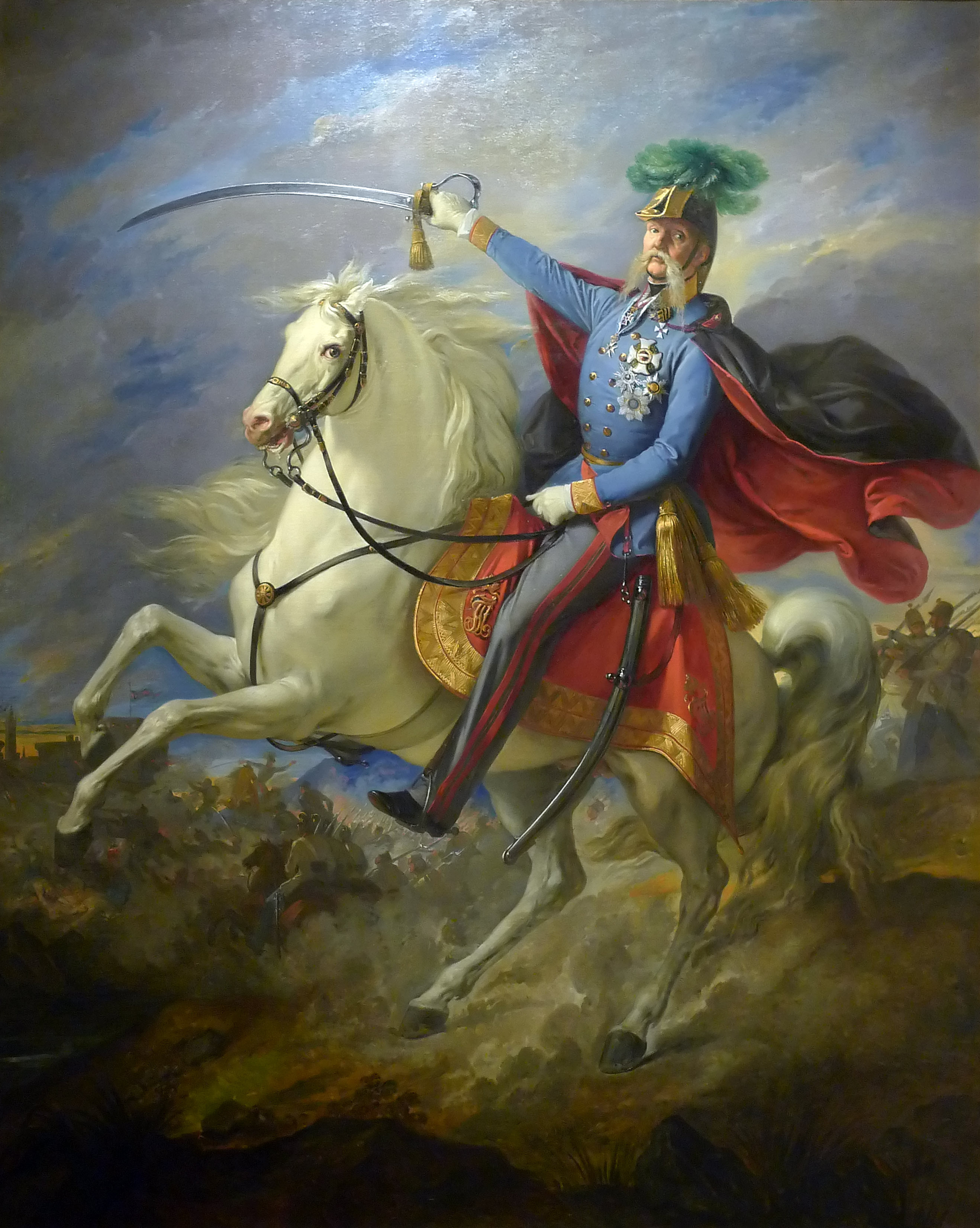
Julius von Haynau (Giuseppe Bezzoli, 1853)

- IV (Reserve) Corps: 97 infantry companies and eight cavalry squadrons (15,549 men, 1,880 horses and 48 cannons), led by Lieutenant-General Ludwig von Wohlgemuth
- Ramberg cavalry division: 32 cavalry squadrons (4,254 men, 4,249 horses and 12 cannons), led by Lieutenant-General Philipp von Bechtold
- Other units: 2,187 men, 932 horses and 72 cannons

=== Russian troops ===
- Panyutyin's (9th) division: 64 infantry companies (11,672 men, 715 horses and 54 cannons), led by Major-General Feodor Sergeyevich Panyutyin

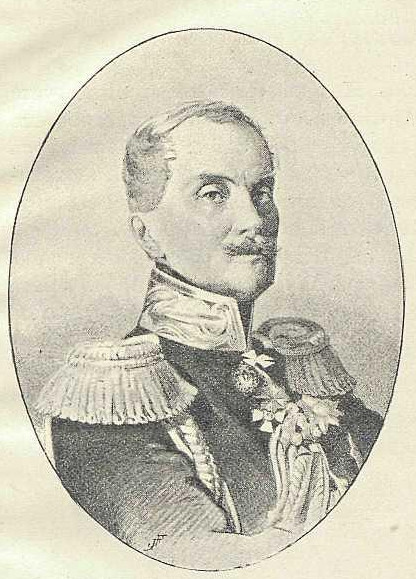
Fyodor Sergeyevich Panyutin

These were a total of 352 infantry companies and 70 cavalry squadrons (64,743 men), 12,454 horses and 276 cannons, commanded by Field Marshal Lieutenant Julius Jacob von Haynau. Since III corps did not participate in the battle, the imperial troops consisted of 287 infantry companies and 56 cavalry squadrons (52,185 men, 10,116 horses and 234 cannons). According to Csikány, Haynau commanded 58,938 men (12,907 of whom were Panyutyin's Russian troops) and 216 guns.
The imperial army's proportions of infantry, cavalry and artillery were ideal for a contemporary army: three to four cannons per 1,000 soldiers, and a cavalry one-sixth the size of the army.

The imperial infantry relied on muzzleloaders; although the more-modern breechloaders were in use by the Prussian Army, the army commandant considered them inaccurate and wasteful of ammunition. The infantry primarily used Augustin M 1842 muskets, with an effective range of 250 meters and 75-percent accuracy to 100 paces. Another weapon used by the Austrian army was the 1842M kammerlader smoothbore rifled musket, which was more accurate and had a longer range than the M 1842. The light infantry was equipped with short-barrel hunting rifles, which were more accurate and reliable than the long-barrelled rifles also used. The imperial cavalry used the 1844 M short, smooth-barrelled cavalry percussion carbine, which was effective to 50 paces. Although it used handguns in close combat, but its main weapons were swords and sabers. Morale was high before the battle, due to Haynau's victories and the presence of young Franz Joseph I and the Archdukes Ferdinand Maximilian and Karl Ludwig in the camp.

=== Hungarian troops ===
According to Róbert Hermann, the Hungarian army was composed of the following corps and units:

- II Corps: 61 infantry companies and eight cavalry squadrons (5,925 men, 885 riding horses, 411 carriage horses and 37 cannons), led by Colonel József Kászonyi
- III Corps: 53 infantry companies and 12 cavalry squadrons (7,766 men, 1,293 riding horses, 520 carriage horses and 40 cannons), led by General György Klapka
- VII Corps: 57 infantry companies and 18 cavalry squadrons (10,661 men, 2,683 riding horses, 663 carriage horses and 46 cannons), led by General Ernő Poeltenberg
- Units of VIII Corps: 20 infantry companies (2,444 men, 10 riding horses, 55 carriage horses and eight cannons), led by Colonel János Janik

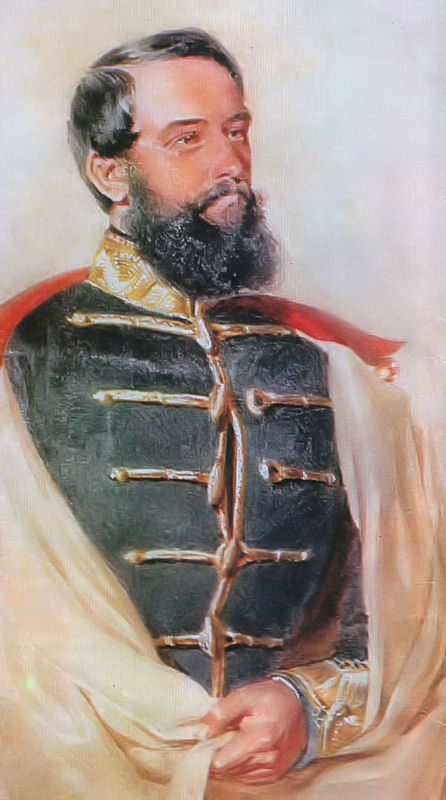
György Klapka by Károly Sterio

A total of 191 infantry companies and 38 cavalry squadrons (26,796 men, 4,871 riding horses, 1,649 carriage horses and 131 cannons) were commanded by General Artúr Görgei. According to Csikány, Görgei commanded 27,400 men and 134 guns. Nearly one-fourth of the army consisted of cavalry, a high contemporary percentage. Although the Hungarian artillery was supported by the fortress cannons, further from the trenches the Austrian artillery was numerically superior.

The Hungarian army was equipped with a variety of weapons (including hunting rifles and parade weapons), but the Austrian and Russian weapons were standardized for efficiency. Although some Hungarian troops used modern percussion rifles, most had tube-lock rifles or flintlock pistols. The swords, primarily used by the hussars who made up nearly all the cavalry, were even more diverse. Some were modern, but many of the swords (or their blades) were remnants of the 16th- and 17th-century Turkish wars.

Although Hungarian morale was lower than that of the Austrians because of previous defeats, the troops still believed that Görgei's military genius would prevail; despite what they considered minor setbacks, and with a counterattack similar to the Spring Campaign, victory could still be achieved. However, the officers (especially Görgei) were increasingly concerned because of alarming news about the Russian invasion and Görgei's worsening conflict with Kossuth. The Hungarian troops (quartered in the barracks or the trenches) were more rested than the mobile imperial army, but many – especially in VIII Corps, designated to defend the fortress – had no close-combat experience.

=== Battle plans ===
After Haynau's 28 June victory at Győr on, the field marshal intended to march to Buda and Pest and occupy the capitals before the Russians arrived. He wanted a decisive victory against the Hungarians, forcing them to capitulate, to demonstrate, that he won the war without Russian help, and to restore the damaged honor of the Habsburg Empire, seen as incapable of dealing alone with a revolution. The fortress of Komárom was in his way, however, which could hide tens of thousands of Hungarian soldiers who could disrupt his communications and supply lines and advance towards Pozsony (present-day Bratislava) or Vienna. Haynau did not know how many Hungarian soldiers were in Komárom and needed to blockade the fortress, which could endanger his plan to win the war without Russian help. He hoped that a small Hungarian force remained in the fortress, so he could continue his march towards the capitals without diverting too many troops. Haynau hoped for (and planned) a show of force, rather than a battle.

Görgei, preoccupied with his conflict with Kossuth and the Hungarian government, did not plan anything for that day. Trying to obey the Council of Ministers' order to retreat east, he awaited the arrival of his scattered units I Corps to begin marching the following day. Görgei and his officers still opposed the council's plan, preferring to fight the Austrians at Komárom. I Corps commander József Nagysándor, aware of Görgei's opposition, moved slowly and did not arrive in Komárom until after the battle. Görgei and the Hungarian leadership, conflicted, did not expect an Austrian attack on 2 July.

=== Positions before the battle ===
Most of the Hungarian VIII Corps units were positioned on the Nádor line (the line defending Komárom from the north) on the Danube.

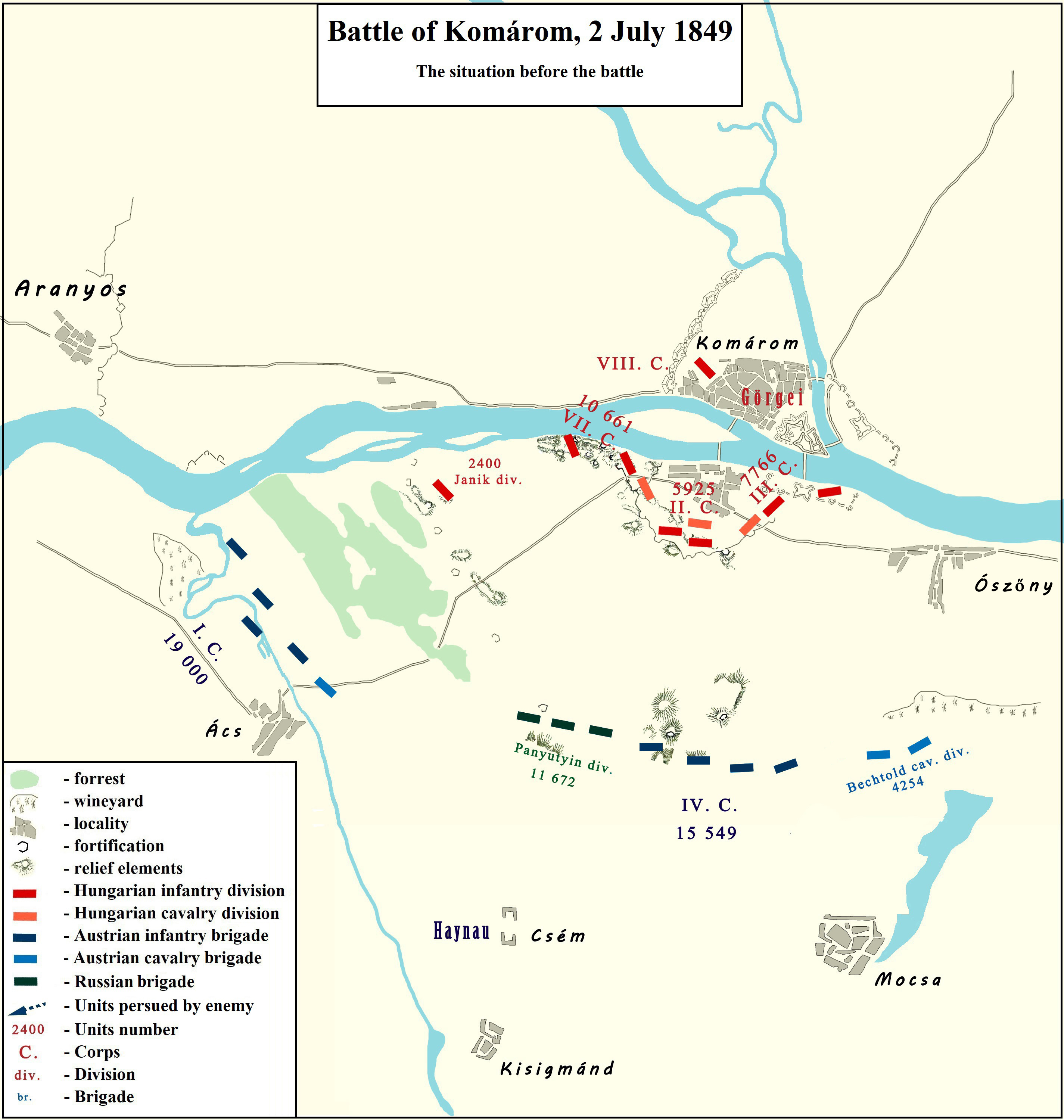
Second Battle of Komárom. Positions before the battle

Most of the other Hungarian troops were positioned on the southern bank of the Danube, in the trenches defending the fortress from the south. Four battalions of VIII Corps' Janik division defended the first, second and third defensive works; the fourth through seventh were guarded by VII Corps, and the Star Trench (Csillagsánc) and the last three defenses were guarded by III Corps. The camp next to the trenches was occupied by the reserve II Corps. Although infantry and cavalry patrolled the fortress, no serious Hungarian reconnaissance was organized and no nearby strategic point (such as Ószőny) was strengthened.

==== West flank ====
When the battle started, the forest of Ács west of the fortress was held by only a few Hungarian units: VIII Corps' 71st battalion and Straube column, two companies and the jägers of the 51st battalion of VII Corps, and a few hussar units.

==== East flank ====
The main strategic point of the flank was the town of Ószőny, defended by General Károly Leiningen-Westerburg's III Corps. The corps had two infantry and one cavalry division, consisting of 6,892 infantry soldiers, 1494 hussars and 46 cannons. Under General János Damjanich, who broke his leg on 27 April, it was one of the most renowned corps of the Hungarian army; the third and ninth divisions of the 19th (Schwarzenberg) infantry regiment were especially courageous. No Hungarian units were placed in Ószőny on the days before the battle, but were stationed in the fortifications around Komárom. The ninth division was stationed in the Star Trench and the ramparts around it, and the third division was in the eighth fortress. Ószőny and the roads around it were guarded by Hungarian hussar units and a few cavalry batteries. The Austrian troops which were about to attack Ószőny were the Benedek brigade of IV (Reserve) Corps and I Corps' Simschen cavalry brigade. The Benedek brigade, led by the Hungarian major general Ludwig von Benedek, consisted of five infantry battalions, eight chevau-léger cavalry squadrons and 12 cannons. The Simbschen brigade, led by Colonel Karl von Simbschen, consisted of 16 cavalry (six chevau-léger, two dragoon and eight lancer) squadrons and six cannons.

==== The center ====
The Herkály grange was the centre of the battlefield. It was held at the start of the battle by IV (Reserve) Corps: 15,549 soldiers, led by Lieutenant-General Ludwig von Wohlgemuth. Early in the battle, his troops observed from other locations.

== Battle ==
=== Imperial attack ===
Western Flank

Haynau ordered to Schlik's I Corps Sartori brigade and sixth jäger battalion to advance with the Reischach brigade and occupy the center of the woods. The Bianchi brigade, with a 12-pound artillery battery supported the Sartori brigade from the rear. The Ludwig cavalry brigade was ordered to occupy the southern portion of the Ács forest and maintain contact with Wohlgemuth's reserve corps from the Herkály grange. The Schneider brigade was ordered to remain in reserve on the heights in front of the forest. The Reischach brigade, after crossing the Concó river, was ordered to advance along the Danube, and occupy the vineyards behind the forest and the northern portion of the forest.

On 2 July, Austrian military activity began at 5:00 a.m. Sappers then began to build a bridge over the Concó, finishing it at 7:45. Their work was protected by five infantry and jäger platoons and a half-battery of rockets. The Ludwig cavalry brigade began advancing at 7:00, occupying designated positions on the right wing of Schlik's brigades and supporting the troops with artillery fire.

The Reischach brigade reached the Ács forest with little opposition, and met Hungarian units which threatened the two Austrian platoons marching on the shore of the Danube. General Sigmund Reischach led a bayonet charge with the Landwehr battalion, supported by jägers, and the Hungarians began to flee towards the fortress. Hungarian right-flank commander General Poeltenberg, seeing the imperial advance and the retreat of the Hungarian vanguard, commanded a counterattack with hussar units and four battalions each from the VII Corps Janik division and Liptay brigade.

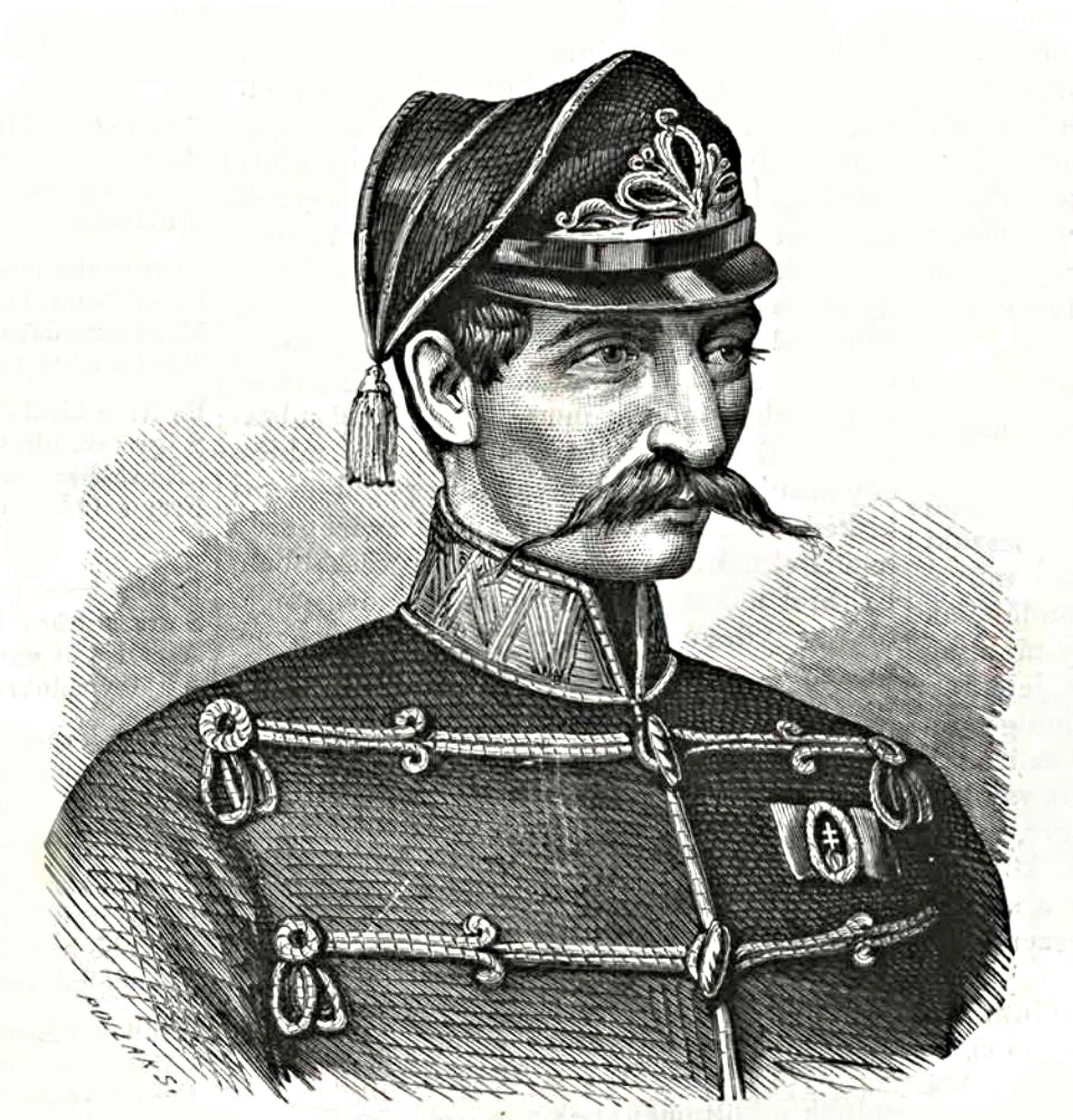
Poeltenberg Ernő VU

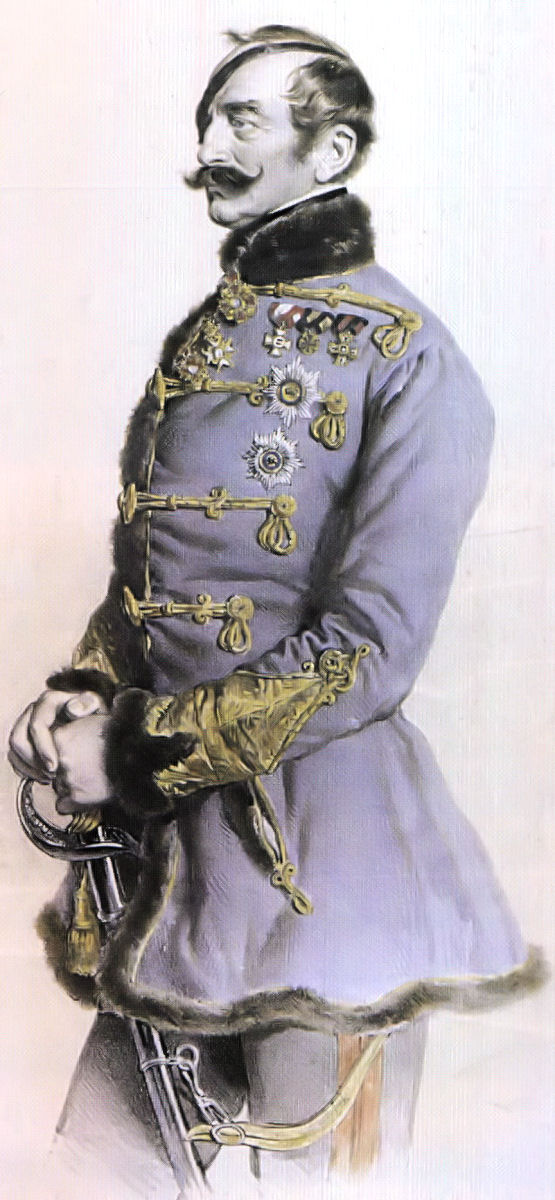
Kriehuber Franz Schlick

Inferior in numbers and lacking artillery support, the inexperienced units were pushed back and began to flee in disorder. Seeing the Landwehr battalion's success, the other Austrian battalions began to pursue the Hungarians; as they approached to 1.5 km (0.93 mi) from the Hungarian fortified encampment, its 12- and 24-pounder cannons had an effect. This did not stop the Reischach brigade, which continued pursuing the Hungarians as Reischach responded to the cannons with rockets. Although Haynau forbade him to attack Komárom's trenches and defensive works, Reischahch did not halt his brigade; he ordered the two battalions of jägers, the first battalion of the Parma infantry regiment and the Landwehr battalion to lead the attack.

The Austrians occupied a portion of the Hungarian defensive works which preceded the fortress itself, and chased the Hungarians from the vineyards. The first Austrian battalion neared the first fortification and, after strong cannon and gunfire, retreated behind a nearby hill. The Parma infantry occupied a Hungarian trench with cannons, and turned them on the fleeing Hungarians. Two companies of the sixth jäger battalion charged with bayonets, occupying two trenches in front of the fortress, and the third company captured a Hungarian howitzer. Here they were hit by harsh cannon and gunfire from the first fortification, causing them to retreat in disorder behind the same hill in the protection of which the Parma infantry retreated earlier. Three small defences in front of the first fortification remained in the hands of the Reischach brigade, which seized two 12-pound and one 18-pound cannons, one mortar, and an ammunition wagon. To keep the defences, the Bianchi brigade sent its five 12-pound battery and Lieutenant General Lichtenstein too sent there a cavalry battery.

At 7:00 the Sartori brigade, the sixth jäger battalion and the 11th rocket battery, preceded by skirmishers, entered the Ács forest; after an attack by Hungarian infantry and jäger brigades, the Austrians counterattacked with rockets and pushed the Hungarians out of the forest. The Sartoris continued their attack with the Reisach brigade and after their artillery and rockets dispersed the Hungarian batteries, they advanced with three battalions of the Archduke Ludwig infantry regiment in two lines (infantry, followed by jägers) and cleared the wheat fields beyond the forest up to a line of hills with burned houses. The brigade rested until a staff officer ordered it to reinforce the Reisach brigade and keep the occupied Hungarian trenches in Austrian hands. Jäger and infantry platoons advanced to the defence nearest the Danube. The Hungarian artillery, shooting from the Hadi-Island in the Danube, hit the Sartori brigade hard and drove it from the occupied defence. The Bianchi brigade reinforced the Sartori brigade's right wing, enduring Hungarian artillery fire from behind the trenches.

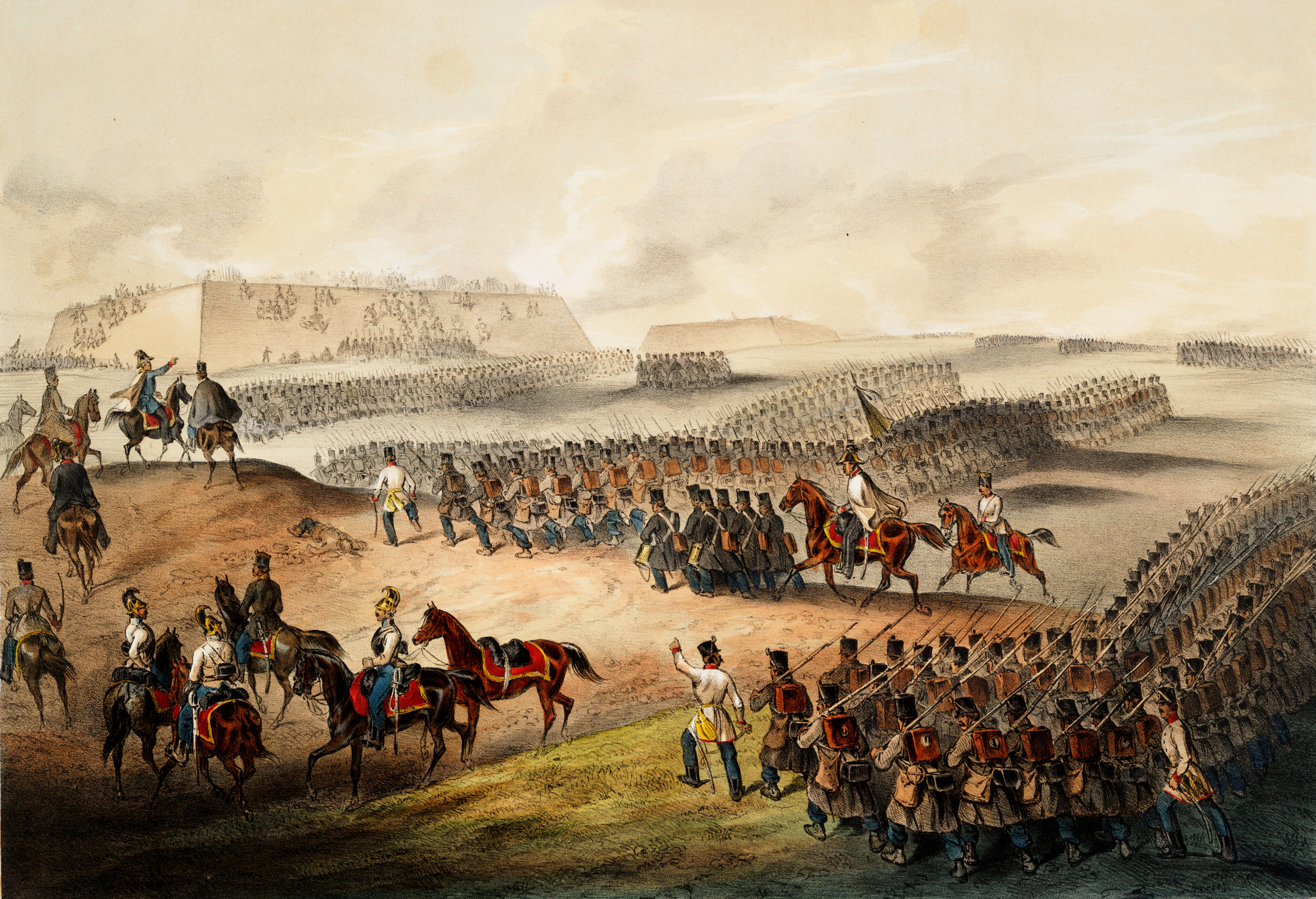
The assault of the fortifications of Sandberg by the Reischach brigade at 2 July

Görgei then arrived on the battlefield. He did not expect a battle that day; the previous night, foreseeing that Kossuth would remove him from leadership of the army, he dictated a memorandum to officer Kálmán Rochlitz explaining his actions. Görgei heard cannon fire towards dawn from Monostor, and one of his officers reported that the battle had begun. He immediately left, telling Rochlitz: We will resume it [the writing of the memorandum] this evening; he said to his chief of general staff, Or maybe this will be not needed. Adieu, Bayer! On his way to the battlefield he met general Kalpka, with whom he agreed that Klapka would lead the left flank; Görgei would lead the right flank, to halt Schlik's advance.

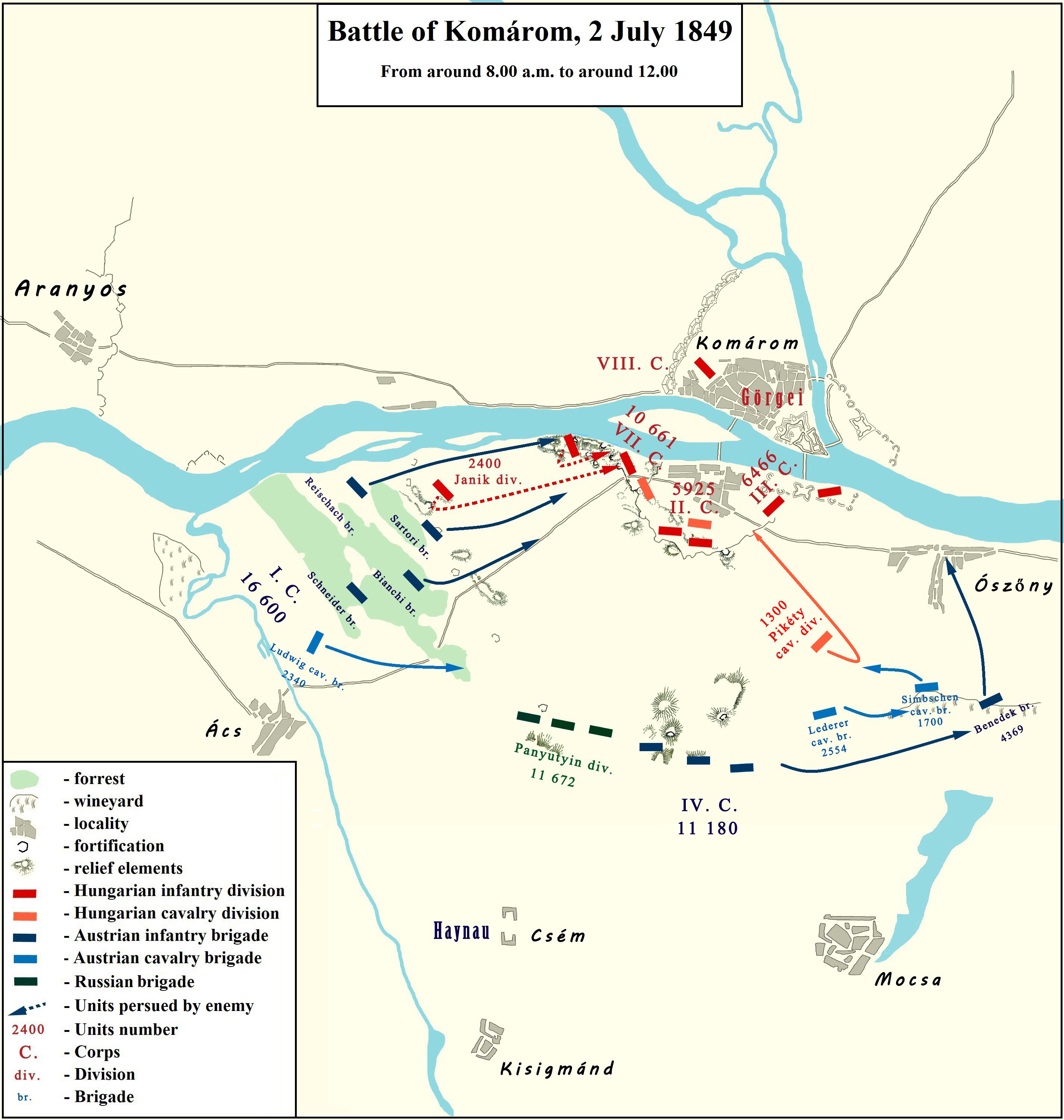
Second Battle of Komárom. The imperial troops attack

Poeltenberg's troops were retreating in disorder when Görgei and his staff arrived on the right flank, and the commander saw that the Austrians had occupied three Hungarian trenches. He retook the trenches with the 71st battalion, which counterattacked in three columns with bayonets and incurred heavy losses. Lacking support from other Hungarian units and under attack from the Danube, however, they had to retreat again.

The imperial advance was finally halted by Hungarian artillery from the fortress and Hadi Island in the Danube and by cannons from the first bastion of the Nádor line across the river. The Hungarian right flank (under heavy Austrian rocket fire) continued its disorderly retreat, endangering the fortifications and potentially opening a path for the Austrians towards Újszőny and the Danube bridge. Görgei ordered to a cavalry battery to move towards the Danube and fill two cannons with grapeshot to dissuade his fleeing troops. He took this drastic measure to save his army despite mistakenly thinking that his younger brother, Captain István Görgey, was among the fleeing soldiers. The cannons shot twice because the soldiers would not halt. Görgei ordered the 48th battalion to fire a salvo, and a group of Hussars managed to stop and reorganize the fleeing soldiers for a counterattack.

Center

The IV (reserve) Corps, under Lieutenant-General Wohlgemuth, began marching from the Csém grange towards the Herkály croft – the center of the battlefield – at 4:30 in front of Franz Joseph I, the Archdukes Ferdinand Maximilian and Karl Ludwig, and the imperial headquarters staff. Haynau established his headquarters at Csém, where the emperor and archdukes watched the battle. Csém was a poor observation choice, however, because a row of hills hid Komárom and the area before it.

IV Corps was ordered to advance on the road towards Újszőny to the Herkály grange and establish contact with Schlik's I Corps. When the corps approached Herkály, brigade leader General Lajos Benedek sent an infantry company and a half-company of chevau-légers to form a skirmish line; attacked by the hussars, they were forced to retreat.

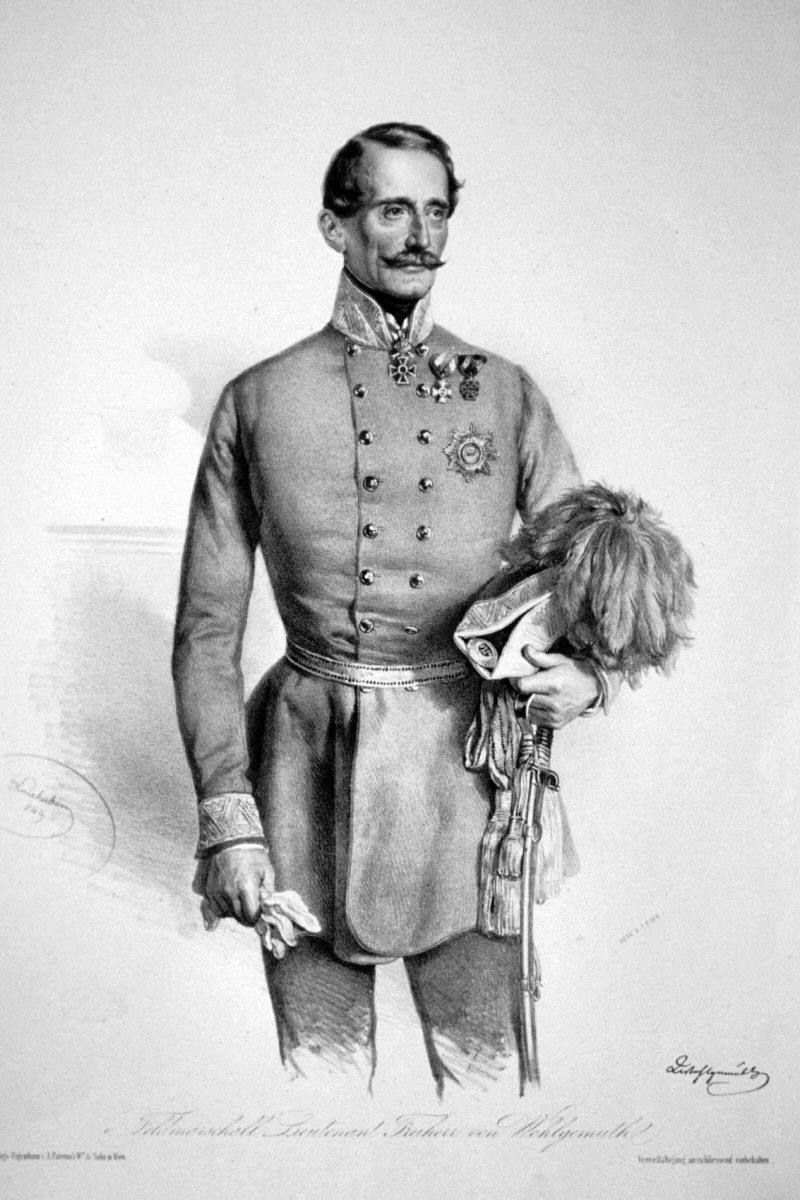
Ludwig von Wohlgemuth

At 8:00, IV Corps arrived at the Herkály grange and occupied the strategic heights. Wohlgemuth's troops supported Schlik's corps in the Ács forest and engaged in artillery duels with Hungarian batteries in the direction of Ószőny. Benedek's brigade had orders to move towards Ószőny, supported by the Simbschen chevau-léger brigade of Bechtold's cavalry division. Bechtold ordered a preliminary show of force in front of Komárom's eighth fortress, however, and the Hungarians responded with batteries from the front and the Ószőny vineyards.

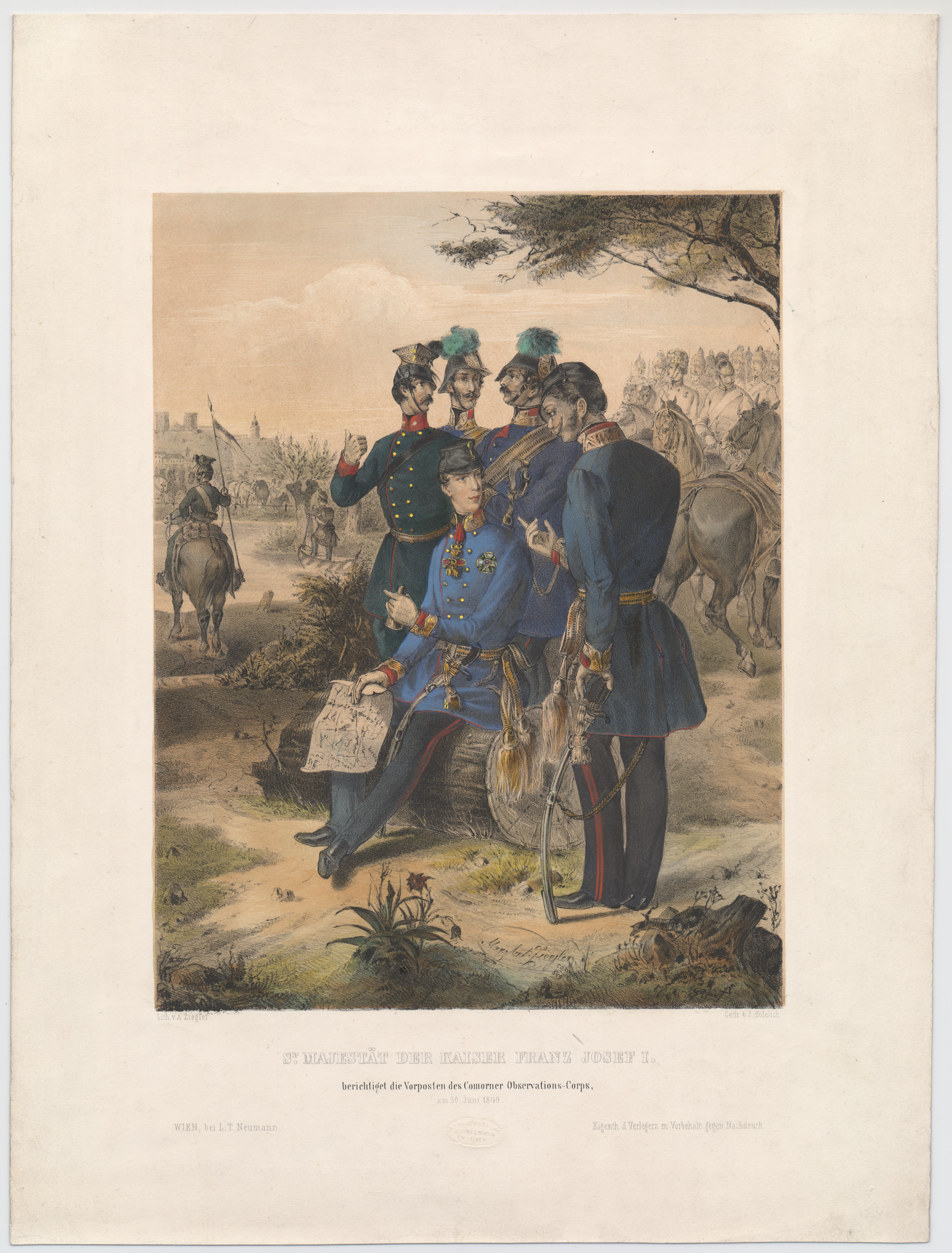
Emperor Franz Joseph I. at the battlefield of Komárom

The Simbschen brigade began a weak counterattack before retreating, under Hungarian cannon fire, behind a row of hills to continue their march towards Ószőny and the Benedek brigade. The rest of IV Corps (most of the Karl chevau-léger regiment, the 20th cavalry battery) remained in the center out of Hungarian cannon range to reinforce the Jablonowski brigade's left wing, while the Lederer heavy cavalry brigade strengthened the brigade's right wing. The Russian Panyutyin division remained in reserve at the rear, between I and IV Corps. The Simbschen cavalry brigade, under heavy attack, was reinforced by the third cavalry battery and two companies of the Ferdinand cuirassier regiment. The Hungarians began a cavalry and artillery counterattack at the Monostor trenches, which was countered by Wohlgemuth by advancing slightly to the right (towards the entrenched encampment) and ordering three of his cavalry batteries to engage in an artillery duel with the Hungarian batteries.

In this phase of the battle the Austrians had important troops to counter the Hungarian troops in the center. Wohlgemuth regrouped his units as follows:

In the first front line he put heavy cavalry brigade with two cuirassier regiments, two additional cuirassier companies, as well the chevau-léger regiment of the Benedek brigade. Next to them was the four Nassau infantry battalions of the Jablonowski brigade. They were supported by three batteries.

The second line of the IV. corps was made by two grenadier brigades.

This huge mass of Austrian elite troops convinced the Hungarians to remain on their positions, but Wohlgemuth forbade to his troops to attack, fearing the devastating fire of the cannons from the fortress. Only the two artilleries continued a heavy duel from 800 paces distance between them.

Eastern flank

Haynau's initial order to Wohlgemuth, the commander of the IV Corps, was to reconnoiter and learn if Ószőny and the road to Esztergom and Buda was in Hungarian hands. Wohlgemuth assigned the brigade of Major-General Ludwig (Lajos) von Benedek, who in the earlier battles confirmed that he is an excellent vanguard commander. The Benedek brigade left the Herkály grange for Ószőny at about 9:00, arriving around two hours later. Although it was struck en route by Hungarian artillery from the Star Trench, there were few casualties. When the Benedek brigade (reinforced by the Simbschen cavalry brigade) neared Ószőny, Leiningen's two Hungarian III Corps cavalry batteries moved forward to meet them. III Corps cavalry leader Gusztáv Pikéthy ordered his hussars to advance, although he had no information about the number and composition of the Austrian troops. The Ferdinánd hussar regiment, two squadrons of the Hannover hussars, and the 3rd and 5th cavalry batteries began advancing towards the Ószőny vineyards, trying to move around the Austrian Simbschen cavalry brigade.

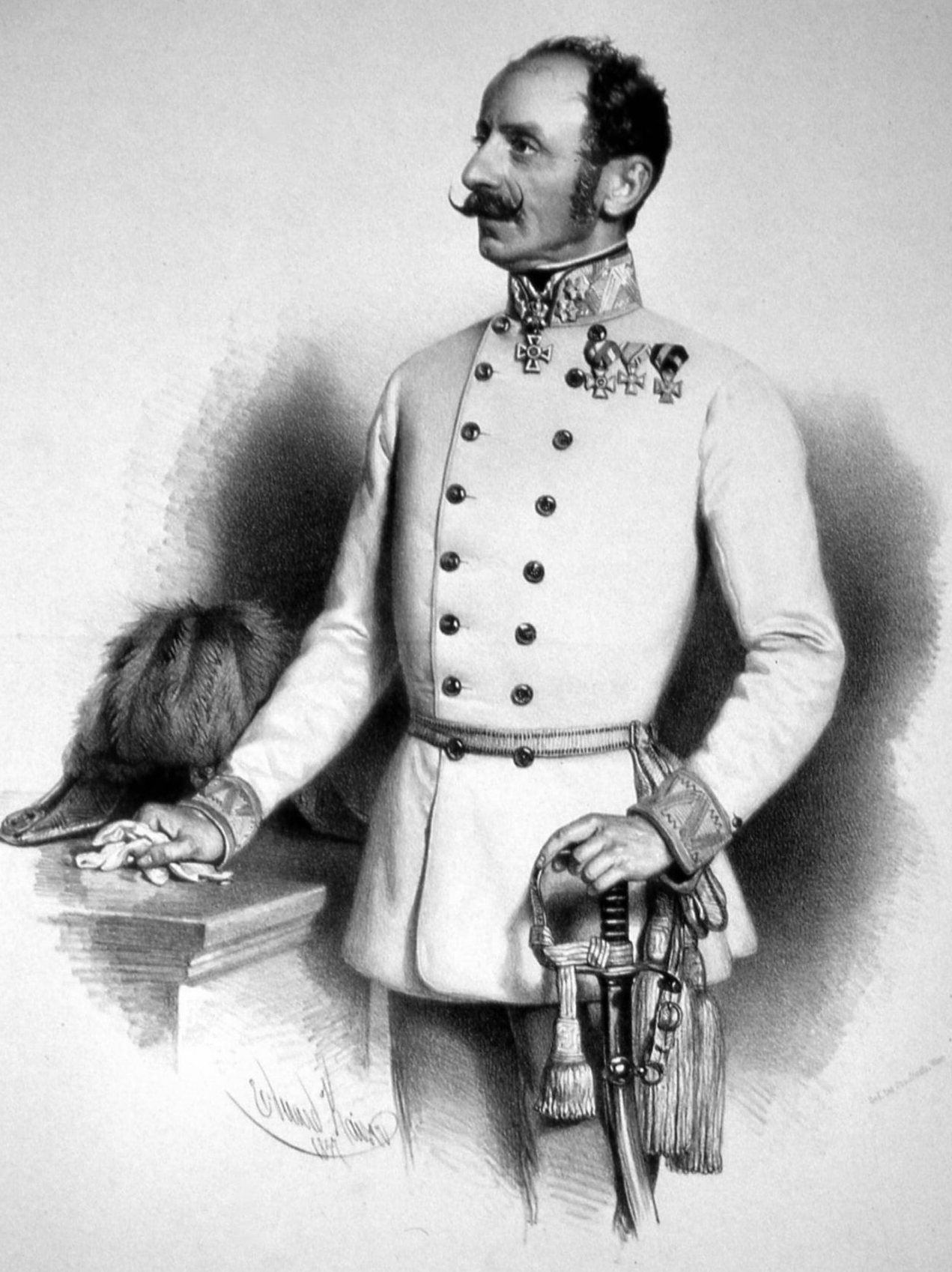
Ludwig von Benedek Litho E. Kaiser (cropped)

The Hungarian batteries, guarded by a battalion of hussars, moved away from the bulk of the hussar companies. They had crossed the Szila creek and were preparing their cannons to fire when the Austrian chevau-légers appeared at 200 paces as lancers attacked the hussars. The Hungarian artillery fired towards the chevau-légers but, because they were on a hill, their grapeshot flew over the Austrians' heads.

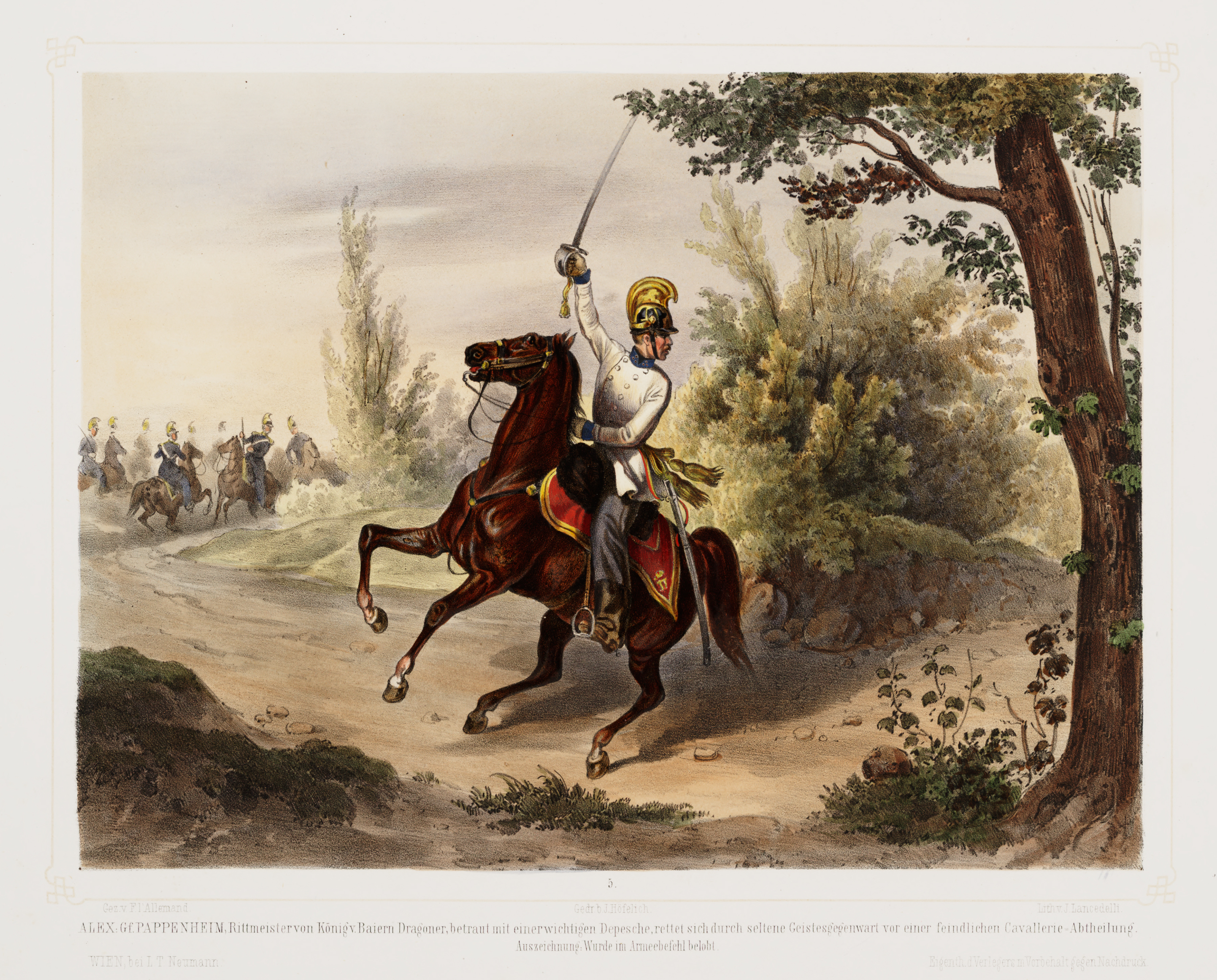
Fritz L'Allemandː Scene from the Battle of Komárom at 2 July 1849. The cavalry battle before Ószőny

A Hungarian ammunition wagon exploded as the lancers advanced towards the hussar battalion, throwing the Hungarian ranks into disarray and enabling the Austrians to drive them off. On the other flank, the imperial chevau-légers attacking the batteries split in two; one battalion attacked the hussar battalion guarding the batteries, and the other battalion attacked the batteries. Because of their inefficient grapeshot and the explosion of their ammunition wagon, the Hungarian batteries and hussars were overwhelmed. Most of the Hungarian artillery troops were killed by Austrian cavalry; a few escaped, hiding in the bushes and among the trees along the Szila creek. The guns, their limbers and two ammunition wagons were captured by the Austrians; the hussars fled towards the Ószőny vineyards, pursued by the imperial cavalry.

The hussars considered the loss of their artillery a blot on their reputation. Major Emil Zámbory, one of the Ferdinánd hussar officers, later wrote: This loss depressed our hussars very deeply, because our regiment had not suffered such a shame even at the time of [the wars with] Napoleon, let alone in the 1848 and 1849 campaign. The hussars from the two regiments attacked the lancers from the left flank, surprising the chevau-légers (who retreated in disorder, leaving the captured Hungarian batteries behind). They were reorganized with the help of Austrian war minister Ferenc Gyulai (who was on the battlefield) and sent back against the hussars, whom they fought on a plain west of the vineyards. The Austrian cavalry was supported from a distance by Benedek brigade artillery, installed on a height behind the vineyards. Although both sides had heavy losses, the Austrians kept the cannons. The hussars reorganized, and 69 attacked again; a hidden Austrian infantry unit fired on them from the Ószőny vineyards, however, wounding 20 men and many horses. The hussars retreated and wanted to attack again, but Hungarian left-flank commander György Klapka arrived, and ordered them to retreat behind the trenches. According to Tamás Csikány, Klapka feared that the Austrian troops attacking the Hungarian right flank could breach and occupy the fortified encampment of Komárom and cut off the Hungarian forces. After the hussars stopped fighting and the Austrian scouts reported that Ószőny was almost completely unprotected by Hungarian troops, Benedek ordered his brigades (the 2nd Jägers company, two companies of the Landwehr division and a unit of chevau-légers) to occupy the town and block its entrances. According to Róbert Hermann the Austrians occupied Ószőny around 12.00 o'clock.

=== Hungarian counterattack ===
Western flank

The Hungarian VII Corps, led by General Ernő Poeltenberg, joined the second phase of the battle and dominated the Hungarian military action. Poeltenberg's corps had two divisions, one cavalry brigade, and a reserve platoon: 10,468 soldiers and 44 cannons. It was supported by units of II. corps: 5,925 soldiers and 37 cannons (two infantry and one cavalry division). Because it was the Hungarian army reserve, only a portion participated in the battle. They had the task to push out of the defenses and the Ács woods the Austrian I Corps, led by Lieutenant General Franz Schlik (one of Austria's most respected and capable generals). The corps consisted of two divisions with four infantry and one cavalry brigade, and an artillery reserve consisting of 19,000 soldiers and 54 cannons.

But in order to start a successful counterattack, first Görgei had to reorganize his shattered units. Although he stopped his soldiers from fleeing, he knew that he could not recapture the defenses facing of the fortress with them. Leaving them with artillery colonel Mór Psotta, he rode to II Corps; according to Lieutenant Alajos Beniczky, II Corps was waiting impatiently for him under heavy artillery bombardment. In his memoirs, petty officer Endre Mihálka wrote that Görgei stopped at the 48th battalion (known as one of the Hungarian army's most renowned units). Görgei asked battalion leader Samu Rakovszky if his troops could drive the Austrians from the trenches. Rakovszky turned to his soldiers, who shouted their assent. Görgei then rode to the 63rd battalion, asking them to support the 48th's counterattack, and sent an adjutants to the Dom Miguel battalion to make the same request. A young lieutenant objected; Görgei rode to the battalion, struck the reluctant officer with his sword, and ordered the battalion to move forward. He then rode to the other battalions and asked them to join the counterattack.

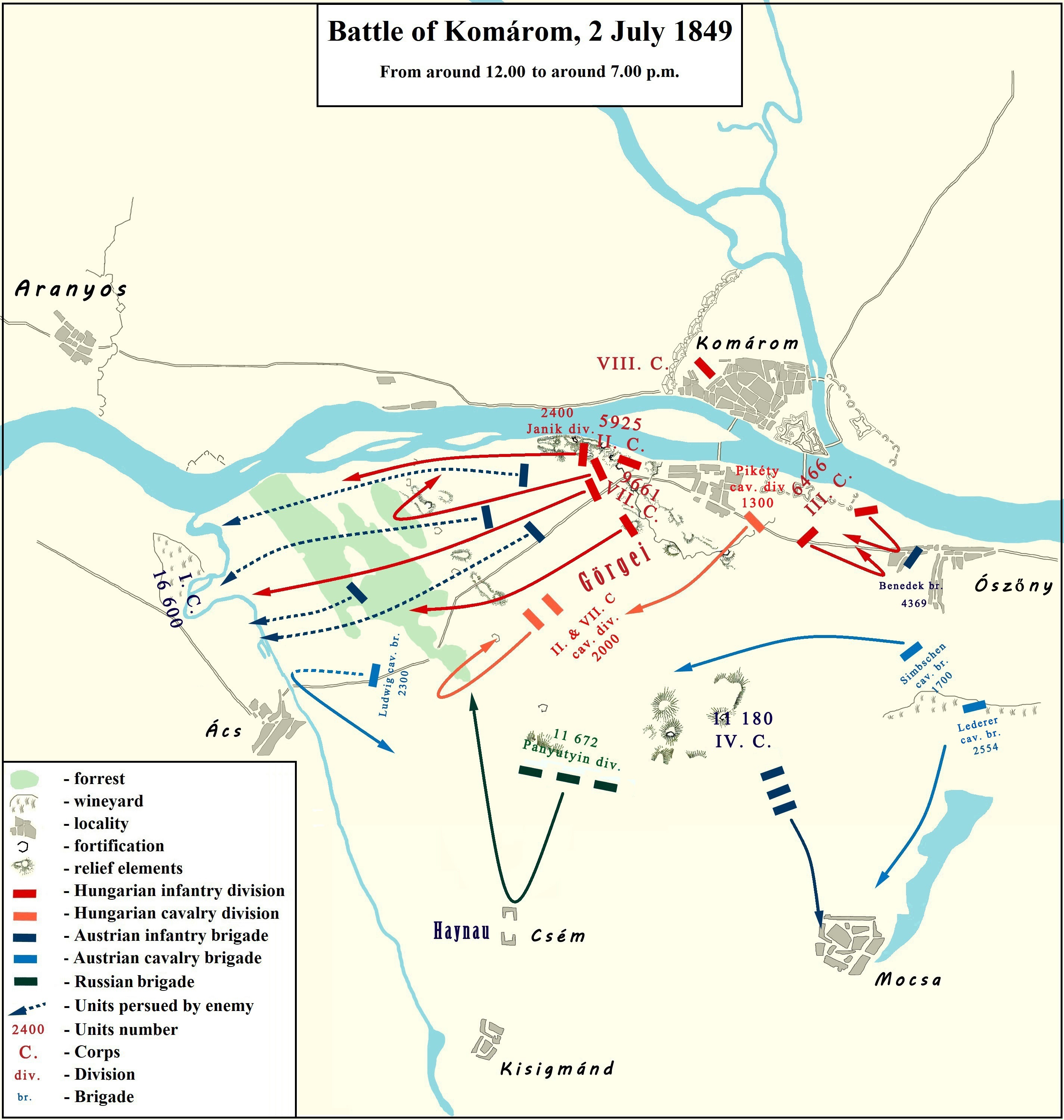
Second Battle of Komárom. The Hungarian counterattack

The Hungarians, led by the 48th battalion and II Corps' Dom Miguel battalion, began attacking the Austrian-held defenses. The VII and VIII Corps troops whom Görgei had stopped from fleeing also participated in the attack. The Hungarian battalions advanced in a loose formation with fixed bayonets (instead of compact formations, as before), using piles of bricks from the unfinished Monostor trenches for cover. Two 48th battalion platoons charged the Austrian artillery, recapturing the Hungarian cannons. The Austrian Reischach brigade was forced to abandon almost all of its captured Hungarian cannons and ammunition carriages, although they spiked the cannons or pushed them into the Danube. The rest of the 48th battalion attacked the Austrian jägers, who retreated to the vineyard and continued firing. A bayonet skirmish began; some of the jägers retreated towards the Ács forest, and the others surrendered to the Hungarians. The Dom Miguel battalion attacked another Austrian-occupied trench, clearing it after a brief fight.

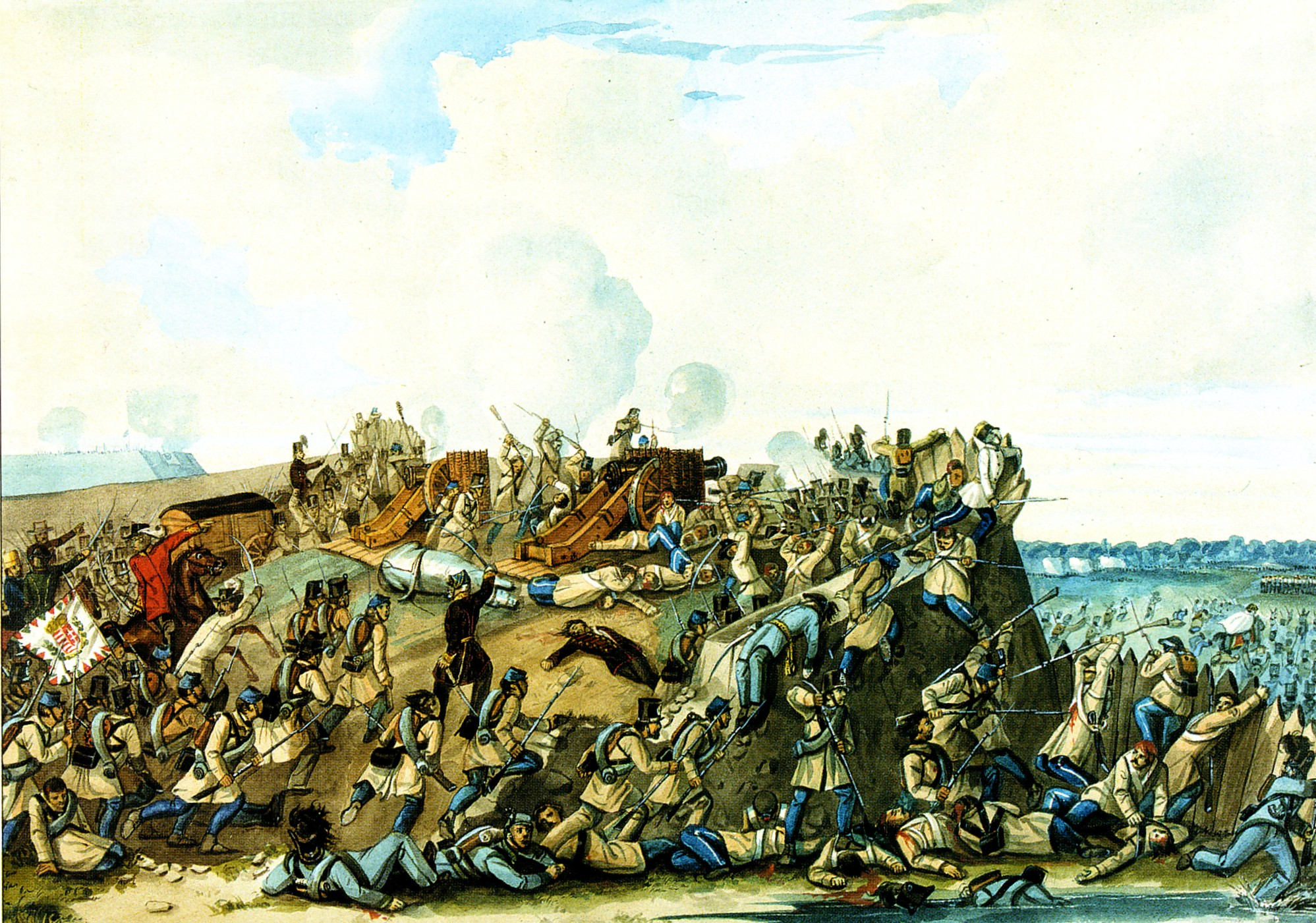
Mór Than: The Hungarian troops of the II. corps led by Görgei recapture the Monostor trench from the Austrians

Görgei, seeing his elite troops' success, ordered them to continue the attack. The inexperienced VIII Corps units which had been driven from the defenses returned to their pre-battle positions again; most of the II Corps battalions (except for the 56th, which Görgei recalled to defend the fourth earth fortification), reinforced by VII Corps, were ordered to attack Schlik's troops in the Ács forest.

The fight to recapture the Ács forest began with a heavy artillery duel as the Hungarian infantry units slowly advanced. The 51st battalion, from the right flank, was the first to enter the forest. The skirmish lines (and communications between the troops) broke, and harsh man-to-man fighting has begun. According to the battalion leader, soldiers in the rear mistakenly began firing at their comrades in the front; this caused more breaks in the skirmish lines and drove many soldiers to retreat. This was explained as a lack of training of the Hungarian soldiers in forest fighting. It caused significant Hungarian losses; the 1st battalion broke away from the others and encircled an Austrian unit before they were attacked with bayonets from two directions and surrendered. When a Hungarian captain attacked the Austrians, they responded with a salvo; Schaumburg wounded the Hungarian captain, which convinced the 50-60 Hungarian soldiers to surrender. When Görgei noticed that the Austrian troops in the center of the battlefield (the Csém and Herkály crofts) almost disappeared (the cause of which will be discussed below), and he ordered II Corps (primarily reserve cavalry and artillery in the fortified encampment) to support VII Corps in the Ács forest.

The Austrian troops had retreated from the center of the battlefield because of Haynau's misjudgment. Hearing about the successful Austrian advance on the western wing and the Hungarian rout by Schlik's forces, he thought that his troops had trapped the Hungarian army behind Komárom's walls; after blockading the fortress from the south, he could move towards Buda and Pest the following day with the rest of his army. The Austrian high commander wrongly taught that the Hungarians renounced to fight to recuperate Ószőny, or the Ács woods, and want only to defend the fortress from the Austrians, as his report issued after the battle shows. At 10:30, Haynau ordered the Lichtenstein division of I. Corps to move to the Herkály grange and the Wallmoden division to hold the Concó creek; IV (reserve) Corps had to retreat from Herkály to Mocsa, III Corps to Nagyigmánd, and Panyutyin's Russian division to Csém while Benedek's infantry and Bechtold's cavalry divisions guarded Ószőny. Schlik seemed to agree with Haynau's order because of increasing Hungarian pressure on his troops and forwarded it to his brigades. The Reischach brigade, in a continuous fight with the advancing Hungarians, retreated in disorder. Lieutenant field marshal Karl von Wallmoden-Gimborn, commander of a cavalry division, tried to relieve the Hungarian pressure by ordering portions of the Sartori brigade (reinforced with battalions of other brigades) to hold the western edge of the clearing behind the cherry forest by pulling back the Hungarians. Colonel Sartori received this order around 2:00, sent the brigade's artillery behind the Concó, and positioned the infantry battalions. Although the Austrians pushed back the pursuing Hungarians for a while, the Hungarian skirmishers forced the Austrians to begin a more orderly retreat. They reached the western shore of the Concó creek under the protection of the Breisach battalion and its 17. six-pounder battery.

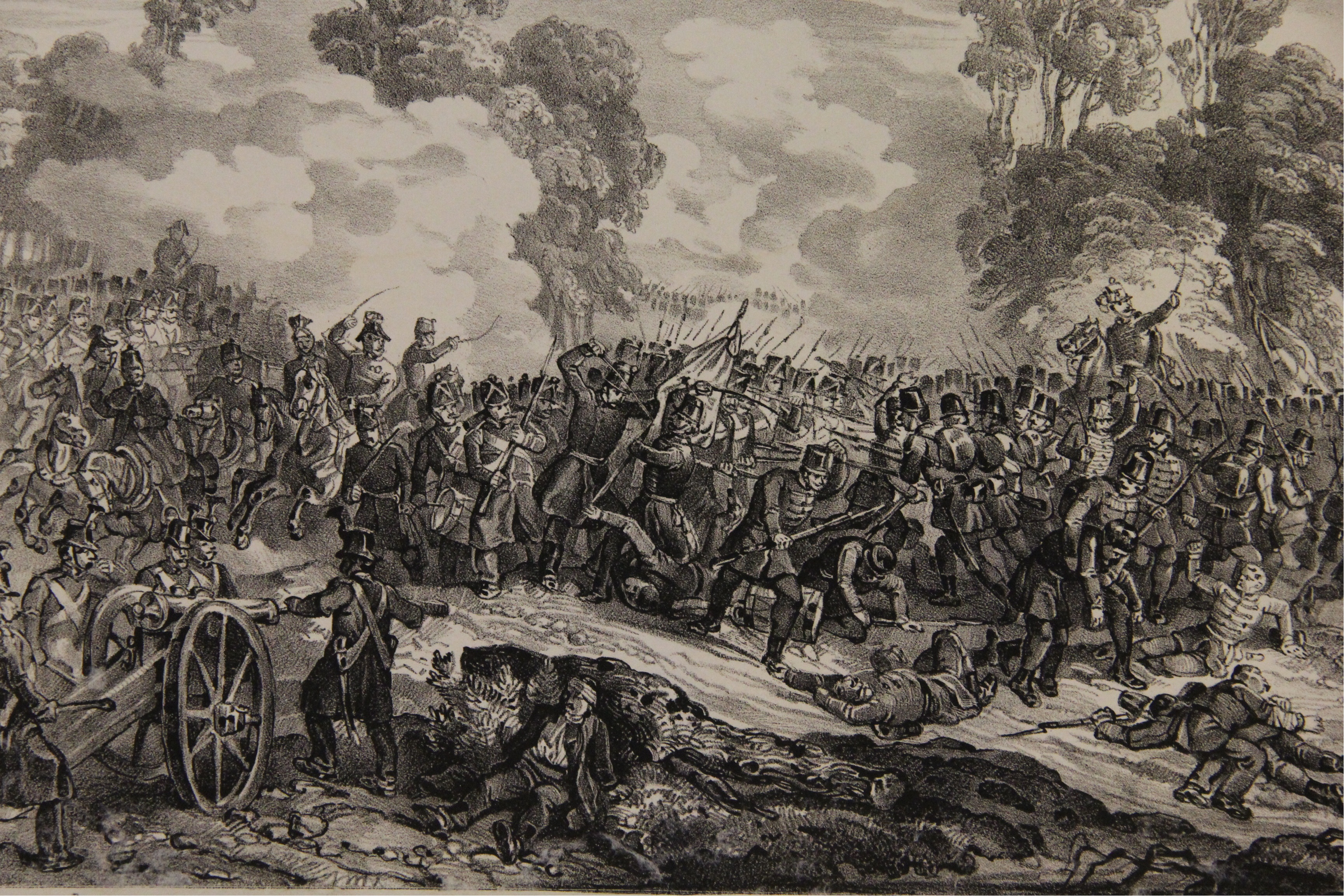
Franz Werner: Skirmish in the Ács woods between the Hungarians and the Austrians during the battle of Komárom on 2 July 1849

To prevent the Hungarians from crossing the Concó creek, at 3:00 Wallmoden ordered the pontoon troops to dismantle the bridge before the retreating Austrian troops arrived. The troops began to dismantle the bridge, planning to use the 22 pontoons as plank bridges for the retreating soldiers and remove them before the pursuing Hungarians arrived. When the Hungarians arrived, they fired on the Austrian sappers; despite an unfavorable current, the pontoons were saved from Hungarian hands and the sapper company retreated to the village of Ács, on the western bank of the Concó creek. The Sartori brigade also retreated to Ács, and the Reischach brigade remained to guard the Concó's western bank. The battle on the northern section of the western flank ended with an Austrian retreat.

At the beginning of the Hungarian counterattack, the situation was quieter on the southern section of the western flank. After the Bianchi brigade occupied their designated positions, Schlik ordered them to retreat to the Ács forest and replaced them with the reserve Schneider brigade. The brigade occupied their positions without much difficulty on the eastern side of the forest: the 1st and 3rd Schönhals battalions secured the edge of the woods near the road, and a squadron of the 14th jäger battalion secured the right edge. On their left was the 3rd Hess battalion, and three squadrons of the Baden battalion were kept in reserve behind the jägers at a clearing. Schlik also positioned two batteries of 6-pound guns 700 paces behind them. The right wing of the Schneider brigade was formed by the Ludwig cavalry brigade.

The Hungarian infantry attack in the Ács forest was supported by artillery, which helped their cavalry in the attack on the southern portion of the forest. During these fights the Austrian Schneider brigade was hit hard from the left by the Hungarian batteries; several Hungarian infantry battalions appeared from the same direction, threatening to attack them from behind. Around 4:00, Schlik issued the retreat order. Despite the Bianchi brigade intervention, the retreat of the Schneider brigade was difficult due to Hungarian pressure.

Around 5:00 p.m., Schlik's I Corps was in a difficult situation. Their right wing was pushed back, after the IV Corps from their right was ordered to retreat by Haynau. The Austrians were pushed back across the Concó creek, with the possibility that I. Corps would be cut off from the rest of the imperial army and driven into the Danube.

Center

The Hungarians massed around 10 batteries (which could have even 80 cannons) in order to support the infantries actions from the Ács woods, the infantry on the left wing and the cavalry units which started to gather in the center. The unusual and hard task of coordinating this important number of cannons was undertaken by Colonel Mór Psotta, one of Görgei's most reliable officers.

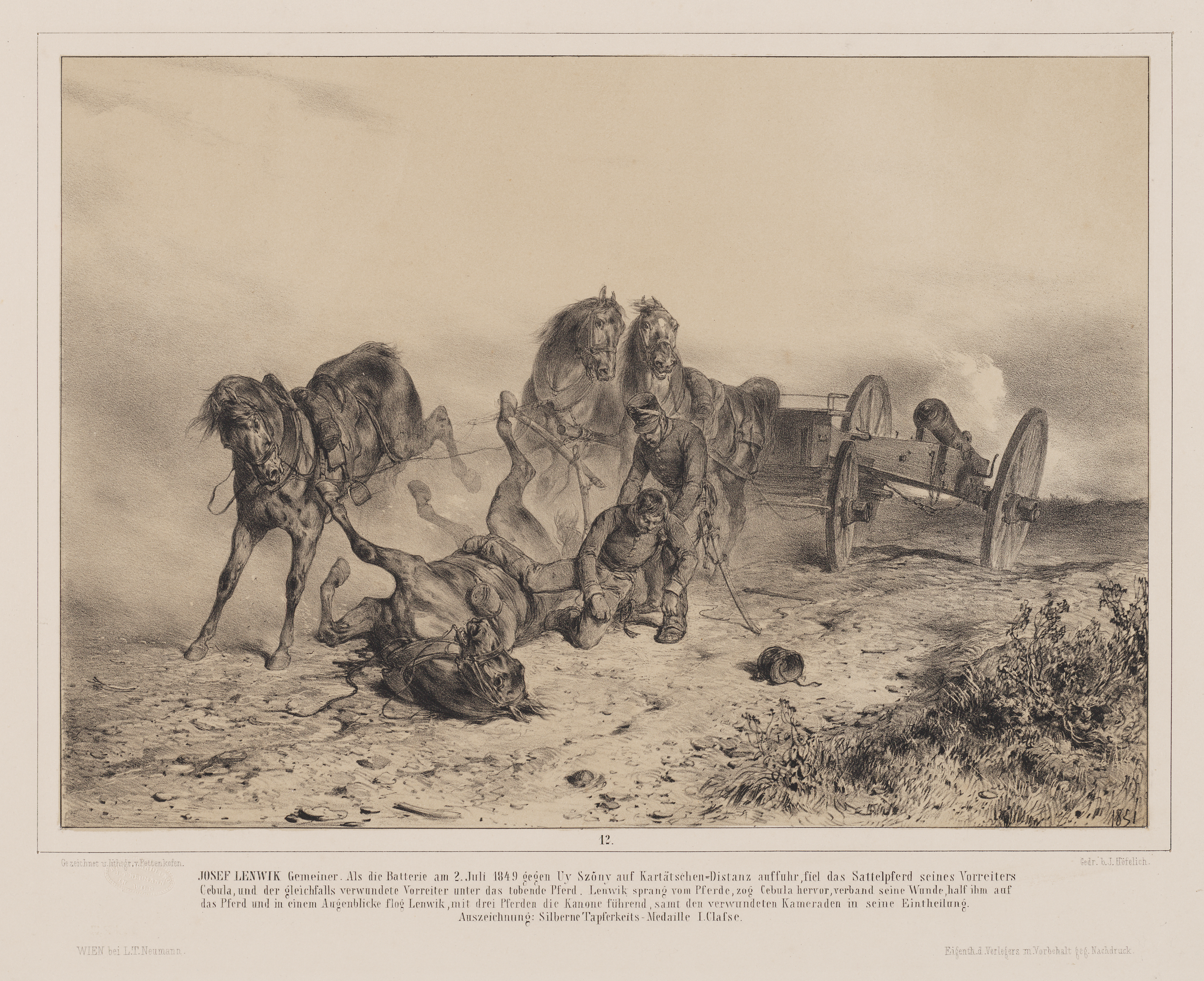
Scene from the artillery battle at Komárom 2 July

The duel between the Hungarian and the Austrian artilleries was still going on, when at 2 p.m. Wohlgemuth received Haynau's order to retreat to the Austrian camp by Mocsa, and the Russian Panyutyin division to retreat to the Csém-farm to rest and to have their lunch. But Wohlgemuth did not executed immediately Haynau's order, because the artillery duel was still going on. So the IV. corps remained on its position until 4 p.m., and continued to fight against the Hungarians, despite Haynau's repeated orders to retreat. Then around 4 p.m., when according to Wohlgemuth's post-battle report, the Hungarian cannons stopped firing back, he ordered his troops to retreat to Mocsa, sending back to Benedek's brigade the cavalry regiment and cavalry battery borrowed from him earlier.

The retreat was difficult to carry out because of the IV. corps was pretty close to the Hungarians, so the heavy cavalry brigade from the first line of Wohlgemuth's Reserve (IV) corps led by Lieutenant-General Bechtold had to remain in their positions until the other three brigades of his troops departed far enough to be out of the range of the Hungarian cannons. The Bechtold brigade waited also until the Panyutyin division retreated from the battlefield covering their retreat towards the Csém-grange. The Bechtold cavalry brigade finally started the retreat from their positions towards Mocsa between 5 and 6 p.m., under the heavy fire of the Hungarians which attacked their left wing with 5 batteries.

Wohlgemuth's gradually retreating IV corps left more and more empty places, isolating Schlik's troops, and Görgei, recognizing the opportunity ordered the VII corps to attack. The leader of the VII. corps, General Poeltenberg had the order to flank Schlik's I. corps right flank, and Görgei sent the artillery and cavalry of the II. corps in support. They assembled about 10 batteries with around 80 cannons, which forced the Ludwig cavalry brigade (composed of two chevau-léger regiments and an infantry battery) to retreat beyond the Herkály grange. Ludwig was also urged by Schlik's order to retreat. The artillery fire helped the II Corps hussars and infantry to occupy the territory between the Herkály grange and the Southern part of the Ács forest, which forced the Austrian brigade holding the Southern section of the woods to retreat; Hungarian infantry battalions also pressured them from the left. This success gave the opportunity to Poeltenberg to extend his troops line towards South, and try to outflank Schlik's I corps. Görgei, seeing the opportunity, sent the cavalry led by Colonel Kászonyi to occupy the Southern edge of the Ács woods. Poeltenberg alined his troops South to Kászonyi's cavalry, tried to fill the gap left by Wohlgemuth's retreating troops, and turning to west, started to pursue Ludwig's retreating cavalry.

Eastern flank

After the capture of Ószőny, Benedek decided to organize its defence, despite some of the officers, thinking that the battle is already won, said that the Hungarians will not try to take it back. The Hungarian born Austrian general asked for more troops to protect Ószőny. After he received the reinforcements, he had the following units in Ószőny: three companies of the 12th jäger battalion, two companies of the 18 (Konstantin) Landwehr regiment, one company of the 4th (Hoch und Deutschmeister) Landwehr regiment, two cannons of the 31st infantry battery, one platoon of the 2nd (Archduke Karl Ludwig) chevau-léger regiment. One of the two cannons was placed on the first defence line behind the barricade closing the Western exit of Ószőny, while the other behind a stone bridge at the second line, organized in the middle of the town. The soldiers hid themselves behind the barricades, in the houses, on the roofs and behind the fences. The rest of the Benedek-brigade (one jäger company, four companies of the Konstantin Landwehr regiment, six companies of the Deutschmeitser Landwehr regiment, four 6, and six 12-pounder cannons, and a chevau-léger regiment) was placed outside of the town at the wine yards.

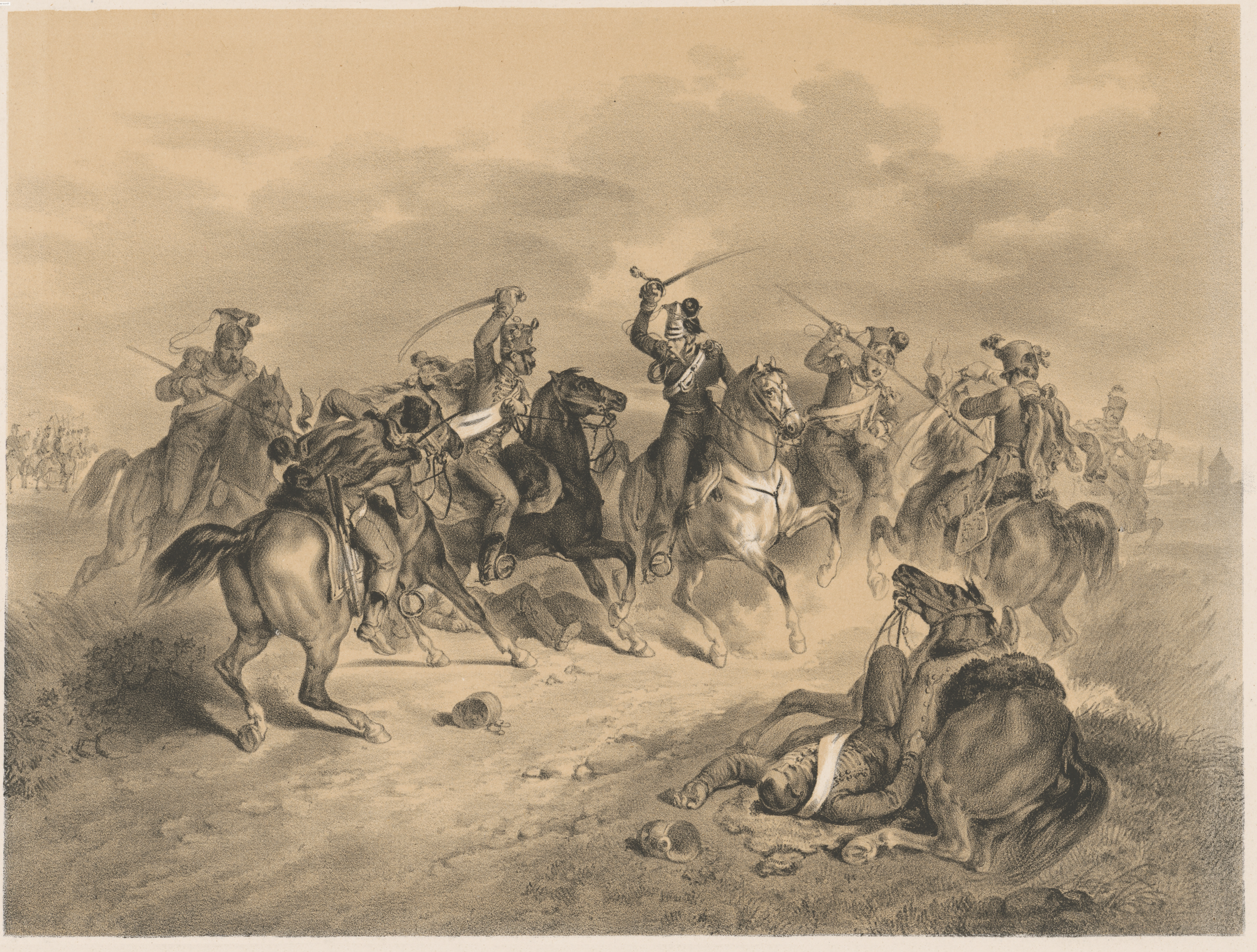
Karl Lanzedelliː Cavalry skirmish before Ószőny 2 July 1849

The Hungarian attack on Ószőny started shortly after General Benedek organized its defence. General György Klapka ordered to several of his infantry battalions to attack from two directions. The first column consisting of the 3rd Honvéd battalion, having in reserve the 3rd battalion of the 19th (Schwarzenberg) infantry regiment, the 3rd battalion of the 52nd (Franz Karl) infantry regiment, and the 65th infantry battalion, while the second column was made of the 1st and 3rd battalions of the 34th (Prussian) infantry regiment, led by Colonel Ede Czillich. The attack was supported by the infantry batteries of the III. corps. An artillery duel started between the Hungarian cannons and the Austrian gun behind the barricade from the Western entrance of the town, supported by the ten imperial cannons from the wine yards. Klapka rushed his infantry to attack during the heavy artillery duel. The Hungarian skirmish line, followed in mass by the battalions managed to break the Austrian defences from the entrance of Ószőny, and push them back to the stone bridge from the middle of the town, some soldiers of the 5th company even breaking into the Eastern part of the town. But at the bridge the two Austrian cannons unleashed grape-shot against the Hungarian infantry massed on the narrow street, then the Austrian soldiers of the Deutschmeister regiment charged, supported with fire from the windows and roofs of the houses by the jägers, pushed back the Hungarians, forcing them out from the town, while the soldiers of the 5th company, cut off from the rest of the Hungarian troops, were surrounded and forced to surrender. The second column led by Czillich was also pushed back with heavy losses.

Seeing his soldiers retreat, Klapka reorganized them, and asked more support from the defense cannons of the fortress, bringing there also several rocket batteries, then sent them again to attack Ószőny, his soldiers advancing under the fences from all the directions, breaking the Austrian defence from the entrance of the town, and pushing back the enemy to the stone bridge again. The Austrians showed an abnormally fierce resistance, and when the Hungarians asked a captured enemy soldier about the reason of this, he answered that the imperial officers fanaticized the devout Catholic soldiers, claiming that if they surrender, the Hungarians will forcedly convert them to Lutheranism. At the stone bridge Benedek, reinforcing his defence with other two 12-pounder cannons, repulsed the Hungarians, pushing them out of Ószőny again. Right after this, Benedek received other reinforcements, consisting in his brigades cuirassier company, and cavalry battery, sent back to him by General Bechtold.

=== The final phase of the battle ===
Western flank

At 5:00 p.m. Schlik's troops were in danger to be destroyed by the Hungarian troops, so the Austrian general reinforced the Schneider brigade with two twelve-pounder batteries, besides he ordered to the Bianchi and Sartori brigades to push back the Hungarians, in the Ács forest, but understanding that his troops were insufficient, he asked Lieutenant General Fyodor Panyutyin to send him a half battery.

During these events, the fight for the Ács forest between Schlik's I corps and the Hungarian II, VII and VIII corps infantry continued, the Austrians receiving in support the Parma battalion of the Reischach brigade led by Colonel Sartori, but their initial attack failed as the left wing was attacked by Hungarian units. The Hungarians chased the retreating Austrian battalions towards the Concó creek, but when an imperial 6-pounder battery, installed on a height, unleashed grapeshot on them, they retreated in the wood.

After the major hussar charge at the Herkály grange towards the evening hours, that will be discussed below, the Hungarian cavalry had to retreat under the cover of their artillery fire. To support these actions from the center, many Hungarian infantry units from the Ács woods were ordered to rush in that direction, and this helped the Austrians, now in numerical superiority, to carry out a successful counterattack. The Schönhals division, the Sartori brigade, the Baden battalion, supported by a rocket battery forced the weakened Hungarians to retreat to the Eastern section of the Ács woods, then in the Cherry Forest (Meggyfa-erdő). Towards 8 p.m. the fights ended in the Western flank.

Center

As shown earlier, conforming to Haynau's order, between 5 and 6 p.m. the Austrian and Russian troops retreated from this portion of the battlefield.

Görgei saw this as an opportunity to win the battle, and started to mass more and more units here, and ordered them to advance. Although the Hungarian VII Corps cavalry, redirected there by Poeltenberg, as mentioned above, also tried to pursue the retreating Austrians, but when they passed next to a hill, they were attacked from the left by the Austrian Simbschen cavalry brigade, then from the right by the Russian Panyutyin division, saving Schlik's corps from the threat of encirclement. Simbschen, who before was on the Eastern flank, on a hill near Ószőny, saw the retreat of the IV. corps from the center, also noticing that Schlik's I corps, is pushed towards Ács by the Hungarian units and artillery, understood that the imperial armies lines are in danger to be cut by Görgei's army, and took the decision to rush with the bulk of his brigade to save the left flank. Panyutyin's Russian division, after retreating, on Haynau's instructions, to Csém, received a request from Schlik, to come and help him. Upon this, Panyutyin without any delay, ordered his division to return towards Herkály. His division was reinforced by the companies of the 1. (Archduke John) Dragoon regiment, led by Lieutenant Count Zichy.

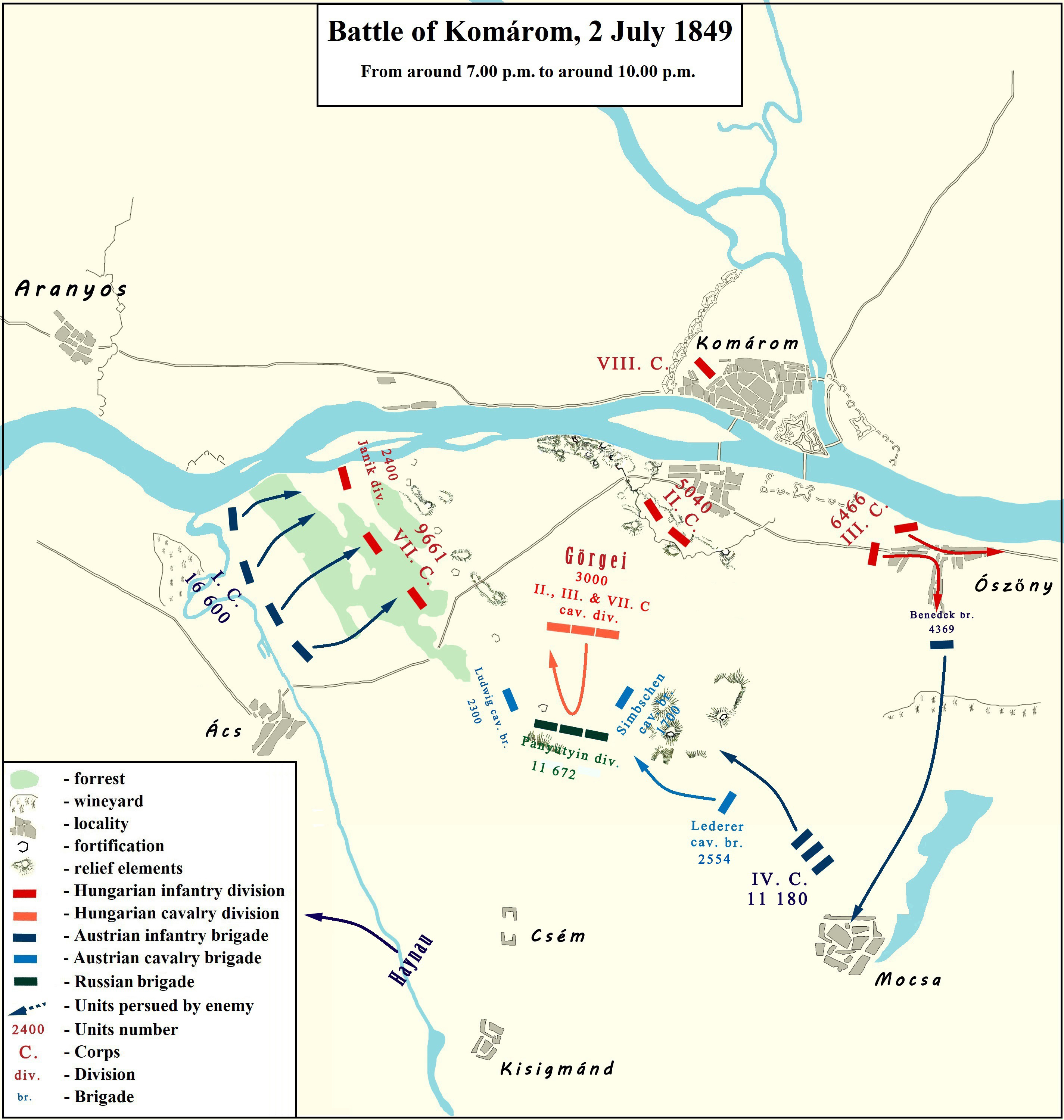
Second Battle of Komárom. The last phase of the battle: the charge of the united Hungarian cavalry divisions, which made possible the recapture of Ószőny

General Poeltenberg, noticing the danger represented by the attack from the left by Simbschen's cavalry and artillery, rushed there with two cavalry batteries, letting Colonel Psotta in charge of the artillery. During the ensuing cavalry battle, the appearance of the Russian division, which deployed its heavy artillery, made Poeltenberg to send a battery from his reserves to counter the Russian cannons. Panyutyin responded by deploying another Russian battery, overwhelming the Hungarian artillery and shooting devastating fire in the Hussar squadrons, which forced Poeltenberg's hussars to retreat in the Ács forest. But noticing that the Russians advanced too much, letting between them and the Ludwig cavalry brigade a gap, stretching between the forest and the Herkály grange, the Hungarian artillery moved forward, and took a position from which they could hit the Russian frontline more easily. Panyutyin responded to this by deploying the 7th infantry battery at Herkály, on the left side of his troops, in the way that 9 cannons were positioned towards the Hungarian batteries, while 3 to their left, positioned in such way to hit from behind the Hungarian units which were attacking Schlik's corps. Being hit from two directions, the Hungarian battery was forced to retreat, and the Hungarian hussars as well. Using this opportunity the Ludwig cavalry brigade advanced, and filled the gap caused earlier by the Russians. The Simbschen-brigade also advanced, supplementing the advanced frontline, formed by Panyutyin. Simbschen strengthened his frontline also with the five companies of chevau-légers sent by General Benedek, forming two lines. Panyutyin sent the 1. (Archduke John) Dragoon regiment in support of Simbschen, who placed them as reserve of his brigade.

The retreat of Poeltenberg's cavalry and artillery, as the result of Panyutyin's and Simbschen's apparition and attacks, threatened to force the Hungarian army, to retreat to the fortified encampment, enabling Haynau to occupy all the strategic locations outside Komárom and its fortifications, and to send the bulk of his troops towards the defenceless Hungarian capital. This meant a serious defeat for the Hungarians. Despite Colonel Psotta's efforts to temper them, the Hungarian gunners started to hesitate. In that moment appeared Görgei with his staff. After surveying the battlefield from a platform, he wrote a note to the troops questioning their resolve, and asking: is there no Hungarian left, who is ready to die for his homeland?, before galloping off to organize the cavalry attack which will constitute the most emblematic part of the battle: the great hussar charge. The note inspired the artillery troops to hold their positions, and to prepare to introduce and support a new attack. In this purpose Poeltenberg strengthened his wings with two cavalry batteries.

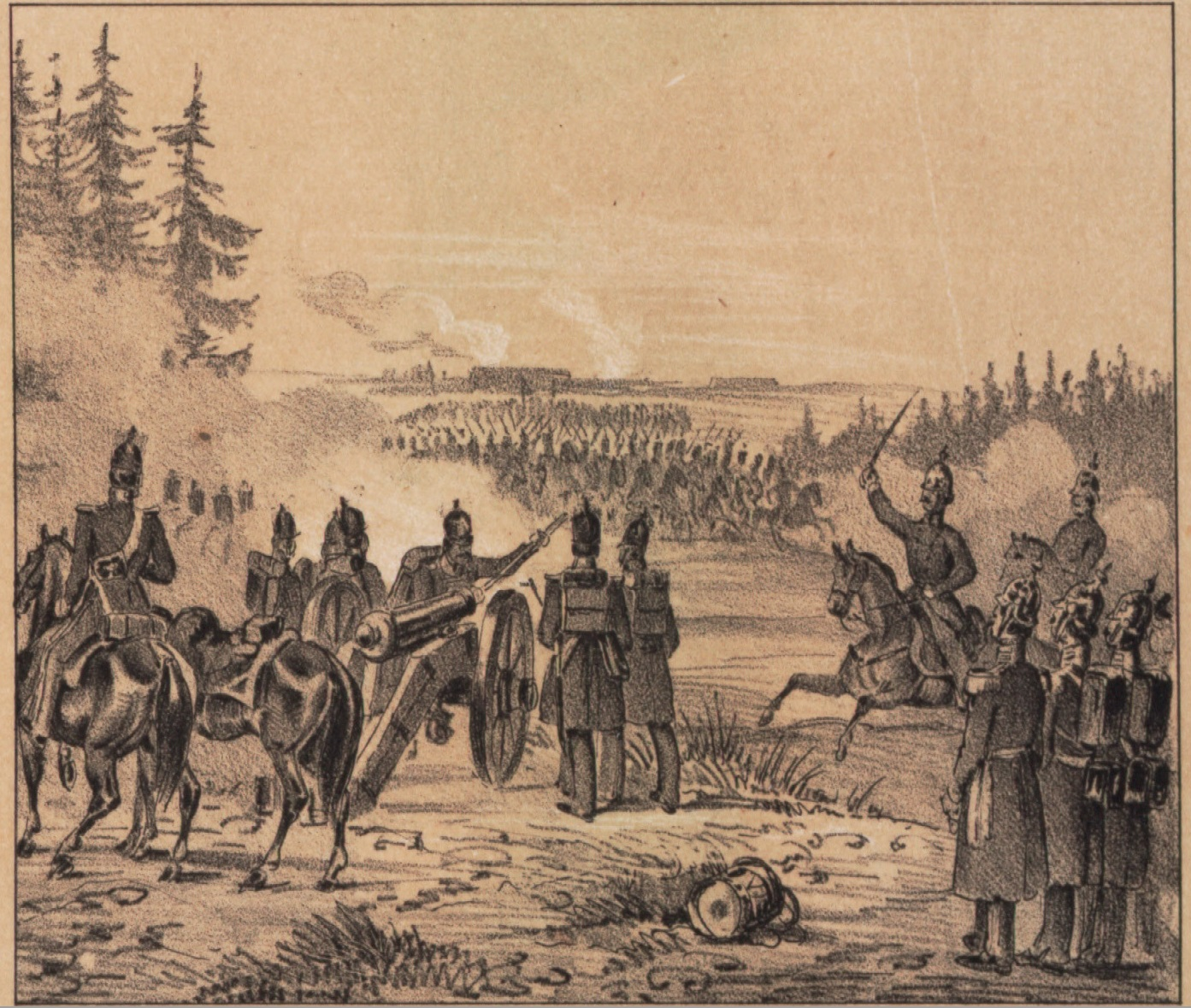
Attack of the Hungarian Hussars against the Russian division in the Battle of Komárom from 2 July 1849. Scenen aus dem ungarischen Feldzuge 1848 und 1849 (Detail)

Not long before that Görgei received the cavalry of the III corps, sent by General Klapka from the Eastern flank, and now he could use in the planned attack the united hussar units of the II, III and VII corps. With this attack Görgei's plan was to pin the Austrians down in the center, to prevent them from strengthening their wings, and most important, to force them to weaken their wings, especially the Eastern flank, in order to enable the III. corps led by Klapka, to recapture Ószőny. He taught that in the most optimal circumstance his attack can break the enemies center, thanks to this to isolate and destroy Schlik's I corps. Görgei organized the hussar regiments for the attack in the following order:
- on the right wing: in the first line the Miklós (Nicholas) regiment, in the second line the Württemberg regiment,
- in the center: in the first line the Károlyi, in the second line the Hunyadi regiments,
- on the left wing: in the first line the Sándor (Alexander), in the second line the Hannover regiment.
The companies of two other regiments were held in the reserve.

In this moment the bulk of the artillery of the Hungarian army was massed there by Görgei, in order to support the incoming hussar charge. The Russian reports speak about 80 cannons (around 14 batteries), which started to shoot in the Russian and Austrian batteries. In order to offset the Hungarian fire, Schlik reinforced the Ludwig brigade with two cavalry batteries and a 12-pounder battery, balancing the enemies fire power. A colossal artillery duel ensued, some of the Hungarian projectiless hitting Csém, where the emperor, the imperial first-aid station and Haynau's headquarters resided. When a Hungarian rocket exploded over the first-aid station, Haynau quickly moved his headquarters back to Bana, while the emperor was convinced only with difficulty by his concerned entourage to leave the village.

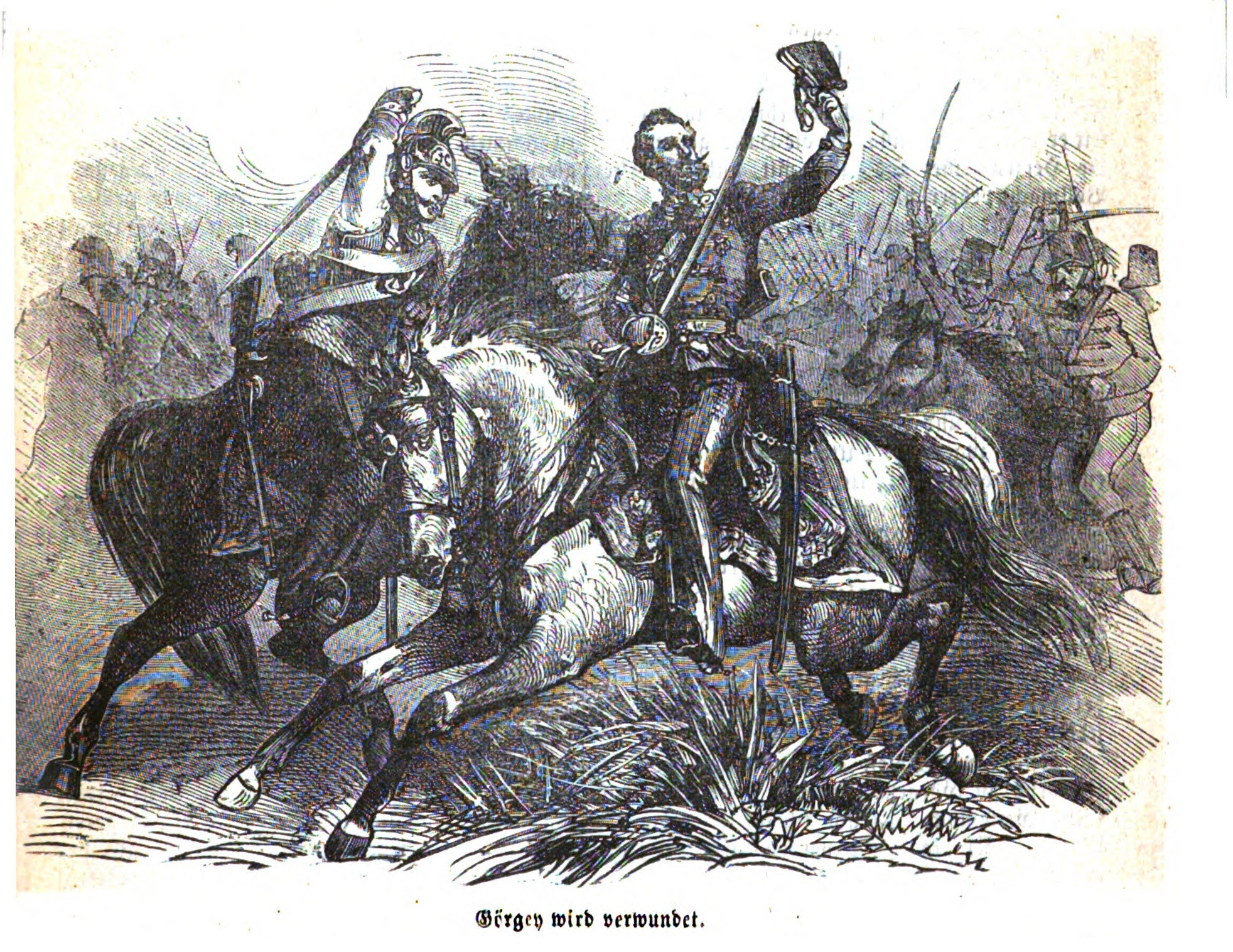
Görgei leads the cavalry charge at Komárom on 2 July 1849

Not long after that the 3000 hussars, led by General Poeltenberg, started their attack against the imperial center, but their left wing was immediately hit by the enemy artillery, which caused them to fall behind, so the whole line turned leftwards. Seeing this Görgei, clothed in red dolman, wearing a hat decorated with a large white feather, immediately galloped to the left wing and shouted to the faltering hussars: Hey boys, why don't you come to attack, following the red coat? This encouragement made the hussars from the left wing to trgain their determination and to gallop in full force, restoring the initial direction of the assault. The hussar-charge first encountered the Lichtenstein chevau-légers, which started to flee without showing much resistance, and the Hungarians chased them from 50 paces distance.

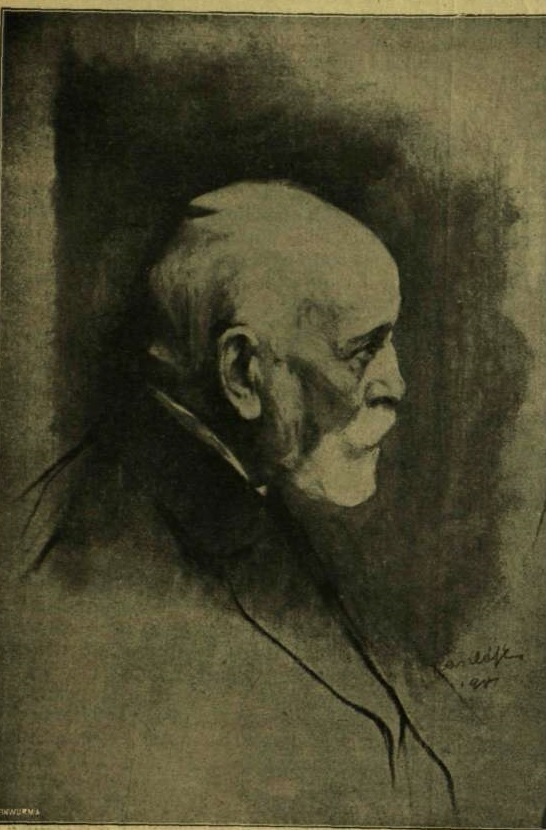
Philip de Lászlóː The old Artúr Görgei with the scar of the Battle of Komárom (2 July 1849) on the back of his head

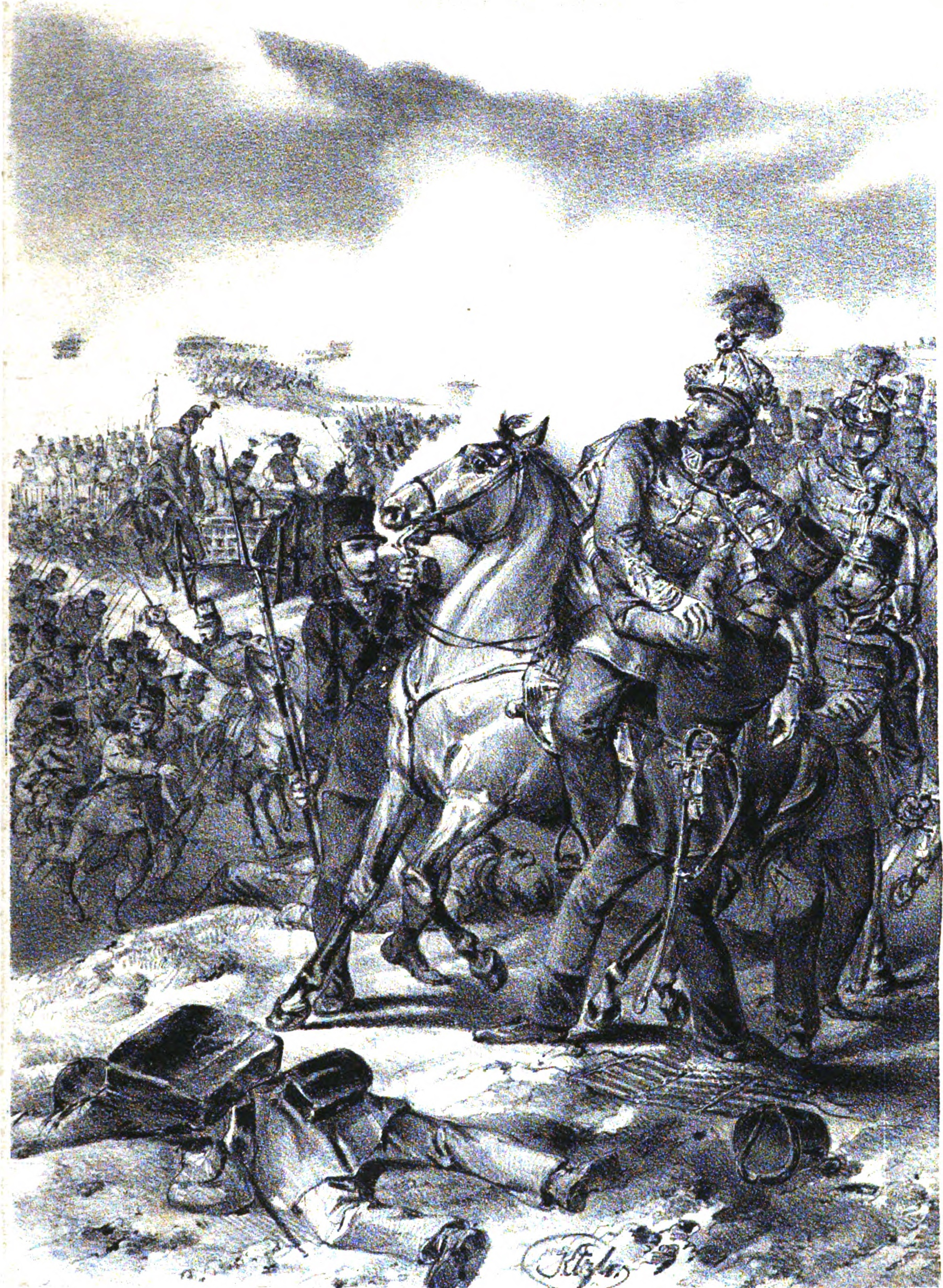
Görgei is wounded in the Battle of Komárom 2 July 1849

During the chasing of the fleeing chevau-légers, the hussars formation broke, and because of this now it was the hussars right wings turn to fall behind. Görgei, who thanks to his big (190 cm to the shoulder), powerful horse, named Csóka (Jackdaw), rode way ahead of his hussars, observed that on the right side an enemy line formed of Polish uhlans threatened the Hungarian cavaleries flank. He knew that against them the only way for a hussar unit to succeed is to prevent them to use their long spears, by a quick frontal attack against them. So he tried to give a signal to General Poeltenberg to reorganize the lines, turn them towards the uhlans, and attack, by taking off his feathered hat and waving it, which caught the attention of the enemy. At that moment he was so close to them that he heard them screaming in Polish to the artillerymen next to them: Only the red one! (Tilko tego czerwonego!), to shoot in Görgei wearing the red dolman. He understood that he became the target of the enemy artillery. Nevertheless, he continued to lead his cavalry towards the enemy way before his hussars.

Observing the unfolding Hungarian cavaleries assault, Panyutyin sent an infantry battery to his right flank, and a heavy battery to the left wing to support his artillery, and ordered his infantry to form squares to counter the cavalry attack. When the hussars led by Görgei were inside of a hundred paces distance in full gallop towards the Russian division, the commander, who tried to give commands with his hat to Poeltenberg and his officers, suddenly suffered a very heavy head injury. According to some historians from the past (for example József Bánlaky) it was an accident or an assassination attempt by a hussar who hit him with his saber, but according to the eyewitnesses nobody was around him at that moment. The most probable theory, accepted by the important researchers of the Hungarian 1848-1849 Revolution and Freedom War (for example Róbert Hermann, Tamás Csikány, Zoltán Babucs) is that he was hit by a splinter of an enemy projectile which exploded over his head. The wound was 12–15 cm long, stretching from the crown to the nape, opening his skull and making his brain visible. When he understood that he is wounded, Görgei halted his horse, and pressed his hat to his head in order to stop the bleeding, then an officer from his staff came and bandaged his head. Despite this horrible injury he remained sane, and continued to lead his troops, but now not in front of them but from behind.

The hussars continued the attack, but the fire of the Russian artillery, and the counterattack of the (imperial) uhlans and the (Archduke John) Dragoon regiment, from the front and flanks halted them, and after a harsh melee, they forced them to retreat. But when the enemy cavalry started to chase the hussars, the precise fire of the Hungarian artillery led by Colonel Psotta chased them back. Then the hussars regrouped and attacked again for 8-9 times, but with same result. During this more and more enemy units appeared in this portion of the battlefield, even the heavy cavalry brigade of the IV. corps led by Wohlgemuth was on its way back to the battlefield but they arrived only after the battle ended. Seeing the continuous strengthening of the center, Görgei understood from this that the hussar attack forced the enemy to transfer troops from the wings to the center, and with this Klapka's chances to recapture Ószőny increased. He ordered another attack, but because of the approaching darkness of the evening (it was around 8 p.m.), and the retreat of the enemy cavalry, he ordered his troops to return in the fortress. The Austrians also retreated to their encampment. After this the seriously wounded Görgei passed out, recovering only two days later, on 4 July.

Eastern flank

After two unsuccessful attacks against Ószőny, General Klapka sent the 14 companies of the III corps to Görgei, to help him in his massive hussar attack against the enemies center. In the same time he continued to attack Ószőny with his infantry and artillery. He understood that the more problems will cause Görgei's attack in the center, the more troops will the enemy commanders redeploy from other sectors of the battlefield to the center, thus weakening the flanks, and increasing his chances to recapture Ószőny.

On the other side, for General Benedek it became more and more difficult to resist to the intensifying pressure. Around 6 p.m. the Simschen brigade which, until then, supported Benedek's actions, started to move towards the Herkály grange, to help Schlik's troops, letting behind only a lancer unit and a cavalry battery to ensure Benedek brigades connection with the rest of the troops. Around 8 p.m. Benedek received the command to retreat from Ószőny.

Lajos Benedek, the Austrian general of Hungarian origin in a letters to his wife, characterizes the situation in which he was in that moment, and his opinion about Haynau's order, with bitter and harsh words: The dead lay round me as if in a shambles. [...] My three batteries [...] ammunition was getting exhausted and no support was sent to me. They (i.e. the Headquarters Staff) were certainly anxious on my account, but about their damned helplessness and irresolution I rather not speak. At least I received the order to leave Szöny [Ószőny] and retire on the III Army Corps. [...] hardly had I taken the place... than the Powers-that-Be broke off the fight at Komorn [Komárom] (which was otherwise quite pointless) and ordered everyone to retire back on our bivouacs. Me they left here exposed.

In this situation Klapka's troops started another attack, sensing that the Austrian resistance started to weaken, because they were moving out of the town. At first Benedek moved out the artillery, and his infantry engaged only in rearguard skirmishes with the attacking Hungarians. To support the retreat Benedek sent a jäger company and a cavalry battery to the Southern edge of the town, which helped the retreating troops enough to avoid important losses. After all the Austrian units left the town, they retreated towards their military encampment from Mocsa, where they arrived around 10,30 p.m.

At the end of the battle the Hungarian troops occupied Ószőny as the result of Görgei's clever plan to lead a daring cavalry attack in the Herkály form, which forced the Austrian commanders to transfer many of their units, which defended Ószőny, to the center of the battlefield, making possible for Klapka to take back this important strategical point.

== Who won the battle? ==
At the end of the battle the Hungarian army, half the size of the imperial troops, forced Haynau's army to retreat from every strategical position they occupied during the battle (threnches and fortifications in the Western part of the fortress, the Ács woods, Ószőny and the hills around it). Although Haynau's official reports speak about a victory, the personal letters of the Austrian generals recognize the commanders failure to achieve his goal to lock the Hungarians in the fortress, and to march towards the Hungarian capital in order to occupy it. Lieutenant General Karl Ludwig von Grünne wrote highly about the performance of the Hungarian army. After this battle the despised Hungarian army started to be regarded as a dangerous opponent by Haynau, and because of the staff sent emperor Franz Joseph back in Vienna to safety. While at the beginning of the battle Haynau was the attacker, later on he totally failed to accomplish his goals, furthermore he made serious mistakes, misjudging the situation, withdrawing the units from the center of his troops, and being unable to control the battle until its end.

Historians like Róbert Hermann, Tamás Katona, György Spira, consider this battle a Hungarian victory, József Bánlaky and, in some of his writings, Tamás Csikány thinks that it was a draw, while later, in another article he declares it a Hungarian victory.

The Hungarian success could have been even greater if the Hungarian division led by György Kmety, would have returned from his march towards Southern Hungary, and attacked Haynau's troops from the back as the High Commandment ordered him, but he considered this too risky, or if the I Hungarian corps led by General József Nagysándor, which, being on the Northern shore of the Danube, on the river Vág's shore, would have been on the battlefield.

== Aftermath ==
As mentioned above, Görgei lost his conscience right after the battle ended, waking up from his unconscious on 4 July. During the time he was unconscious, two medics examined the wound, and found that it was so deep that it reached the brain. The doctors sutured the wound, but because they did not applied any drainage three days later it became infected and purulent. Then dr. Sándor Lumnitzer, the chief surgeon of the war ministry sent by Kossuth, opened Görgei's headwound and cleaned the bone and the brain, saving his life. During this surgery on his brain, the Hungarian commander stood on his feet, leaning on the sink used by the medic for this medical intervention. Later he was replaced by dr. Lajos Markusovszky, a surgeon friend of Ignác Semmelweis, a pioneer of the antiseptic procedures. It is probable that Markusovszky used some of Semmelweis's medical procedures to keep Görgei's wound clean.

After the battle, still on the same day, the courier of Lieutenant General Lázár Mészáros, with Kossuth's order about Görgei's replacement, on the leadership of the Hungarian army, with Mészáros. Görgei being unconscious, the deputy commander, General Klapka, called an officers meeting, presenting them the governments decision. Hearing this, the outraged officers protested, saying that they only trust in Görgei, and wrote a letter to the Government, asking them to let their commander in his place. General Klapka and General József Nagysándor travelled to Pest with this petition, and forced the Government to accept their demand. The government renounced also to demand the immediate retreat of the Army of the Upper Danube to southern Hungary, allowing it to try to break the Austrian blockade.

On 6 July the council of war was held in Görgei's presence decided on his demand, to try the breakthrough against the army of Haynau on 9 July. But after receiving another order by Kossuth, who, changing his mind, demanded again the retreat to southern Hungary, Klapka, without Görgei's knowledge, sent the I corps towards Pest. Hearing this, Görgei resigned, upon this the council of war forced Klapka, to call back the I corps, and convinced Görgei to withdraw his resignation.

== See also ==
- First Battle of Komárom (1849)
- Third Battle of Komárom (1849)

== Sources ==
- Bona, Gábor (1996). Az 1848–1849-es szabadságharc története ("The history of the Hungarian War of Independence of 1848–1849) (in Hungarian). Budapest. ISBN 963-8218-20-7.
- Bóna, Gábor (1987). Tábornokok és törzstisztek a szabadságharcban 1848–49 ("Generals and Staff Officers in the War of Independence 1848–1849") (in Hungarian). Budapest: Zrínyi Katonai Kiadó. p. 430. ISBN 963-326-343-3.
- Csikány, Tamás (2015). A szabadságharc hadművészete 1848-1849 ("The Military Art of the Freedom War 1848–1849") (in Hungarian). Budapest: Zrínyi Katonai Kiadó. p. 382. ISBN 978-963-327-647-1.
- Csikány, Tamás (2013), "Egy céltalan haditerv - Komárom 1849 július 11" (PDF), Hadtörténelmi közlemények
- Csikány, Tamás (2008). Hadművészet az 1848-49-es magyar szabadságharcban("The Military Art of the Freedom War of 1848-1849") (in Hungarian). Budapest: Zrínyi Miklós Nemzetvédelmi Egyetem Hadtudományi Kar. p. 200.
- Görgey, Artúr (2004). Életem és működésem Magyarországon 1848-ban és 1849-ben- Görgey István fordítását átdolgozta, a bevezetőt és a jegyzeteket írta Katona Tamás (My Life and Activity in Hungary in 1848 and in 1849). István Görgey's translation was revised by Tamás Katona, and also he wrote the Introduction and the Notes. Neumann Kht.
- Hermann, Róbert (2001). Az 1848–1849-es szabadságharc hadtörténete ("Military History of the Hungarian War of Independence of 1848–1849") (in Hungarian). Budapest: Korona Kiadó. p. 424. ISBN 963-9376-21-3.
- Hermann, Róbert (2004). Az 1848–1849-es szabadságharc nagy csatái ("Great battles of the Hungarian War of Independence of 1848–1849") (in Hungarian). Budapest: Zrínyi. p. 408. ISBN 963-327-367-6.
- Hermann, Róbert (2013). Nagy csaták. 16. A magyar függetlenségi háború ("Great Battles. 16. The Hungarian Freedom War") (in Hungarian). Budapest: Duna Könyvklub. p. 88. ISBN 978-615-5129-00-1.
- Hermann, Róbert (1999), ""Tenni kevés, de halni volt esély." Az 1849. évi nyári hadjárat ("For Doing Something it Was Little Chance, but to Die it Was a Lot". The Summer Campaign of 1849)" (PDF), Hadtörténelmi Közlemények. 112. (1999) 1.
- Pusztaszeri, László (1984). Görgey Artúr a szabadságharcban ("Artúr Görgey in the War of Independence") (in Hungarian). Budapest: Magvető Könyvkiadó. p. 784. ISBN 963-14-0194-4.
- Spira, György (1959). A magyar forradalom 1848-49-ben ("The Hungarian Revolution in 1848-49") (in Hungarian). Budapest: A Magyar Tudományos Akadémia Történettudományi Intézete. p. 678.
