= Dropie =

Protected area in Slovakia

Coordinates: 47.8694°N 17.93814°E

- Interactive map of Dropie
- Area: 9.12 km^{2}
- Established: 1955
- Governing body: ŠOP - S-CHKO Dunajské luhy

Dropie is a protected site in the Slovak municipalities of Čalovec, Kameničná and Zemianska Olča in the Komárno District. The protected site covers an area of 912 hectares (2,250 acres) of the Danube floodplain area. It has a protection level of 4 under the Slovak nature protection system.

== Description ==
The protected site was created to protect the endangered bird species Great Bustard, especially its display sites, the sites of breeding and hibernation.
