= Moča =

Moča Dunamocs
- Municipality
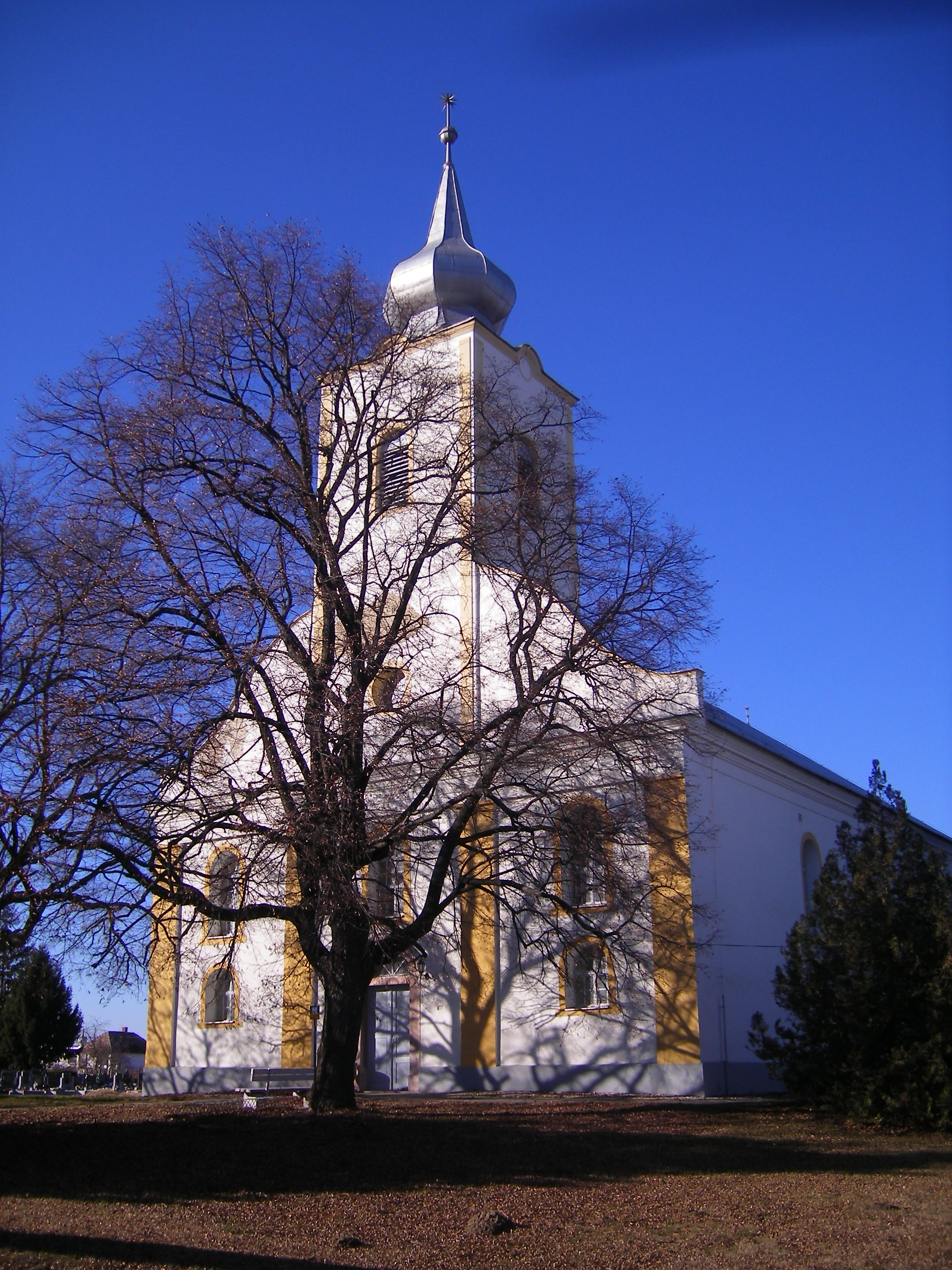
- Reformed church

- Flag Coat of arms

- Location of Moča in the Nitra Region Location of Moča in Slovakia
- Coordinates: 47.76°N 18.41°E
- Country: Slovakia
- Region: Nitra Region
- District: Komárno District
- First mentioned: 1208

Area
  - Total: 17.99 km^{2} (6.95 sq mi)
- Elevation: 109 m (358 ft)

Population (2025)
  - Total: 1,135
- Time zone: UTC+1 (CET)
  - Summer (DST): UTC+2 (CEST)
- Postal code: 946 37
- Area code: +421 35
- Vehicle registration plate (until 2022): KN

Moča (Hungarian: Dunamocs, Hungarian pronunciation:[ˈdunɒmotʃ]) is a village and municipality in the Komárno District in the Nitra Region of south-western Slovakia.

== Geography ==
The municipality lies at an altitude of 109 metres (358 ft) and covers an area of 17.99 km^{2} (6.95 sq mi) (2025).

== History ==
In the 9th century, the territory of Moča became part of the Great Moravia. In historical records the village was first mentioned in 1208. After the Austro-Hungarian army disintegrated in November 1918, Czechoslovak troops entered the area, later acknowledged internationally by the Treaty of Trianon. Between 1938 and 1945 Moča was occupied by Miklós Horthy's Hungary through the First Vienna Award. From 1945 until the Velvet Divorce, it was part of Czechoslovakia. Since then it has been part of Slovakia.

== Population ==
Population statistic (10 years)
Year	1995	2005	2015	2025
Count	1191	1166	1134	1135
Difference		−2.09%	−2.74%	+0.08%

Population statistic
Year	2024	2025
Count	1145	1135
Difference		−0.87%

It has a population of 1135 people (31 December 2025).

=== Ethnicity ===
Census 2021 (1+%)
Ethnicity	Number	Fraction
Hungarian	1011	89.31%
Slovak	96	8.48%
Not found out	72	6.36%
Total	1132	

In year 2021 was 1132 people by ethnicity 1011 as Hungarian, 96 as Slovak, 72 as Not found out, 5 as Czech, 2 as German, 1 as Italian, 1 as Rusyn and 1 as Russian.

Note on population: The difference values of population numbers in the table "Population statistic" and in the sections "Ethnicity" & "Religion" is caused by the use of various statistical methods.

=== Religion ===
Census 2021 (1+%)
Religion	Number	Fraction
Calvinist Church	657	58.04%
Roman Catholic Church	294	25.97%
None	114	10.07%
Not found out	48	4.24%
Total	1132	

In year 2021 was 1132 people by religion 657 from Calvinist Church, 294 from Roman Catholic Church, 114 from None, 48 from Not found out, 10 from Evangelical Church, 3 from Greek Catholic Church, 2 from Jehovah's Witnesses, 1 from Eastern Orthodox Church, 1 from Christian Congregations in Slovakia, 1 from Other and 1 from United Methodist Church.

== Sights ==
- Village Museum – We can see an excellent ethnographic and regional collection in this Museum, and according to the interest the exhibition can be completed also with interactive programs. The visitors can discover the colourful and rich world of the old peasant culture. The present exhibition deals with four themes:
  - The development of the population and the village history
  - Important personalities of the village
  - The ship-mills, millers on the River Danube
- The Statue of Lilla – the work of the sculptor Gyula Mag from the year 2009. The statue is a memory of the poet, Mihály Csokonai Vitéz's love, Lilla. She got to the village Moča through her second marriage.
- The Reformed Church – built in the Classicist style between 1856 and 1860. Previously, the Reformed had a house of prayer and a bell tower in the village. The tower of the church was destroyed in 1945 and restored by 1956. One of the largest Reformed churches in Slovakia.
- The Statue of St. John Nepomuk – a copy of the 18th century statue of St. John of Nepomuk, destroyed in 1945, by Gyula Mag, was inaugurated on May 16, 2009, on the Süttő promenade.

== Recreation ==
- The EuroVelo 6 cycle route between Komárno and Kravany nad Dunajom passes through Moča.

== Facilities ==
The village has a public library, a gym and a football pitch.
