= Šrobárová =

Šrobárová Szilasháza
- Municipality
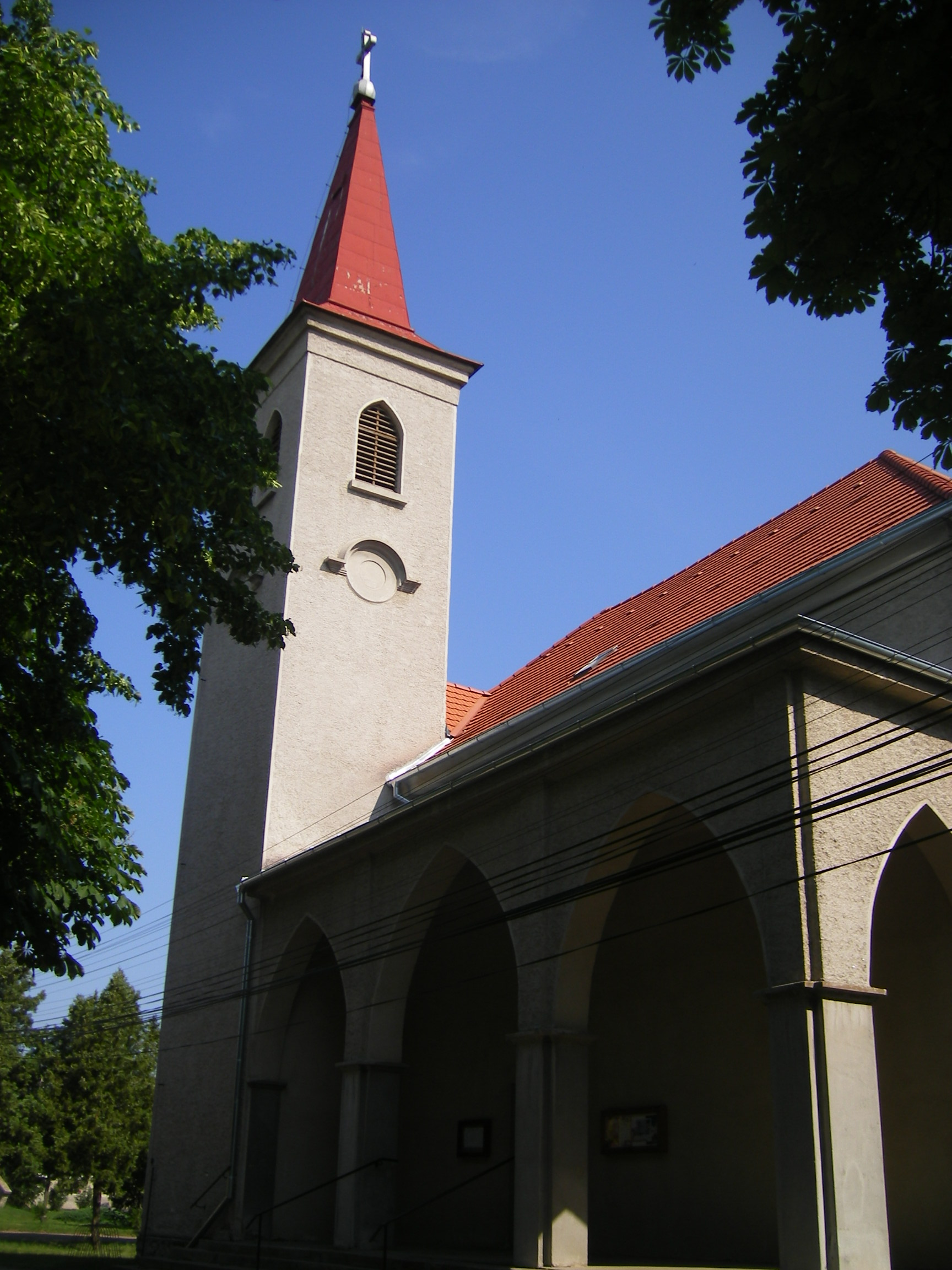

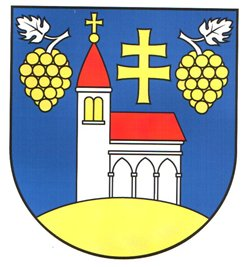
- Flag Coat of arms

- Location of Šrobárová in the Nitra Region Location of Šrobárová in Slovakia
- Coordinates: 47.80°N 18.32°E
- Country: Slovakia
- Region: Nitra Region
- District: Komárno District
- First mentioned: 1926

Area
  - Total: 8.38 km^{2} (3.24 sq mi)
- Elevation: 127 m (417 ft)

Population (2025)
  - Total: 486
- Time zone: UTC+1 (CET)
  - Summer (DST): UTC+2 (CEST)
- Postal code: 946 32
- Area code: +421 35
- Vehicle registration plate (until 2022): KN
- Website: www.obecsrobarova.sk

Šrobárová (Hungarian: Szilasháza, Hungarian pronunciation: [ˈsilɒʃhaːzɒ]) is a village and municipality in the Komárno District in the Nitra Region of south-west Slovakia.

== Geography ==
The municipality lies at an altitude of 127 metres (417 ft) and covers an area of 8.38 km^{2} (3.24 sq mi) (2025).

== History ==
In the 9th century, the territory of Šrobárová became part of the Kingdom of Hungary. After the Austro-Hungarian army disintegrated in November 1918, Czechoslovak troops occupied the area, later acknowledged internationally by the Treaty of Trianon. The village was established in 1926. Between 1938 and 1945 Šrobárová once more became part of Miklós Horthy's Hungary through the First Vienna Award. From 1945 until the Velvet Divorce, it was part of Czechoslovakia. Since then it has been part of Slovakia.

== Population ==
Population statistic (10 years)
Year	1995	2005	2015	2025
Count	498	478	503	486
Difference		−4.01%	+5.23%	−3.37%

Population statistic
Year	2024	2025
Count	485	486
Difference		+0.20%

It has a population of 486 people (31 December 2025).

=== Ethnicity ===
Census 2021 (1+ %)
Ethnicity	Number	Fraction
Slovak	468	92.67%
Hungarian	26	5.14%
Not found out	16	3.16%
Czech	7	1.38%
Total	505	

In year 2021 was 505 people by ethnicity 468 as Slovak, 26 as Hungarian, 16 as Not found out, 7 as Czech, 3 as Ukrainian, 1 as Italian and 1 as Rusyn.

Note on population: The difference values of population numbers in the table "Population statistic" and in the sections "Ethnicity" & "Religion" is caused by the use of various statistical methods.

=== Religion ===
Census 2021 (1+ %)
Religion	Number	Fraction
Roman Catholic Church	371	73.47%
None	79	15.64%
Not found out	14	2.77%
Calvinist Church	12	2.38%
Evangelical Church	12	2.38%
Baptists Church	6	1.19%
Total	505	

In year 2021 was 505 people by religion 371 from Roman Catholic Church, 79 from None, 14 from Not found out, 12 from Calvinist Church, 12 from Evangelical Church, 6 from Baptists Church, 4 from Greek Catholic Church, 3 from Christian Congregations in Slovakia, 2 from Jehovah's Witnesses, 1 from Eastern Orthodox Church and 1 from United Methodist Church.

The village is around 96% Slovak and 4% Magyar.

== Facilities ==
The village has a public library and a football pitch.
