= Holiare =

Holiare Gellér
- Municipality
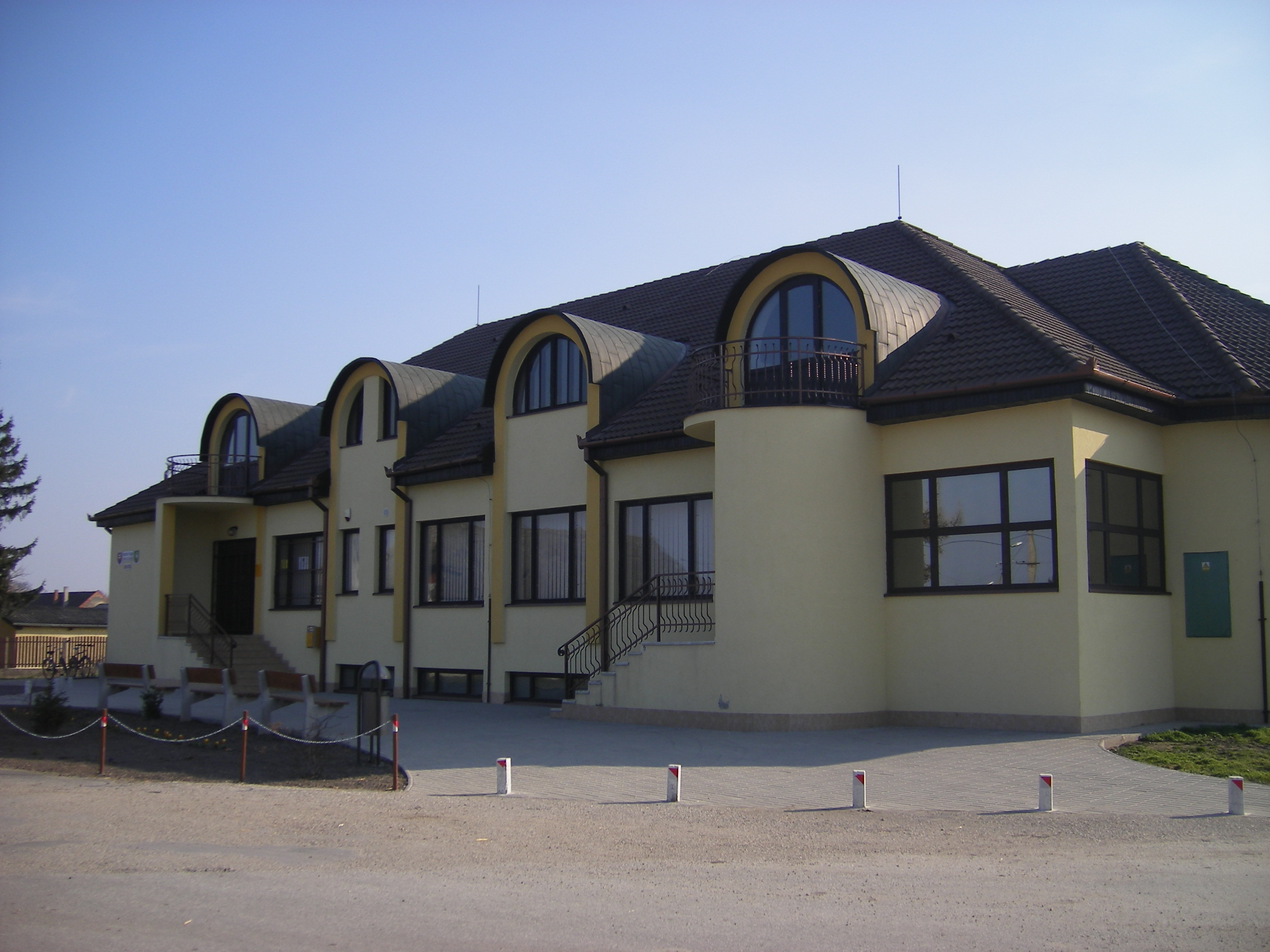
- Municipal office

- Flag Coat of arms

- Location of Holiare in the Nitra Region Location of Holiare in Slovakia
- Coordinates: 47.83°N 17.82°E
- Country: Slovakia
- Region: Nitra Region
- District: Komárno District
- First mentioned: 1257

Government
  - Mayor: György Kürthy (SMK-MKP)

Area
  - Total: 9.88 km^{2} (3.81 sq mi)
- Elevation: 110 m (360 ft)

Population (2025)
  - Total: 454
- Time zone: UTC+1 (CET)
  - Summer (DST): UTC+2 (CEST)
- Postal code: 946 16
- Area code: +421 35
- Vehicle registration plate (until 2022): KN
- Website: www.holiare.sk

Holiare, until 1948 Gelér (Hungarian: Gellér, Hungarian pronunciation:[ˈɡɛlleːr]) is a village and municipality in the Komárno District in the Nitra Region of south-west Slovakia.

== Geography ==
The municipality lies at an altitude of 110 metres (360 ft) and covers an area of 9.88 km^{2} (3.81 sq mi) (2025).

== History ==
In the 9th century, the territory of Holiare became part of the Kingdom of Hungary. In historical records the village was first mentioned in 1257. After the Austro-Hungarian army disintegrated in November 1918, Czechoslovak troops occupied the area, later acknowledged internationally by the Treaty of Trianon. Between 1938 and 1945 Holiare once more became part of Miklós Horthy's Hungary through the First Vienna Award. From 1945 until the Velvet Divorce, it was part of Czechoslovakia. Since then it has been part of Slovakia.

== Population ==
Population statistic (10 years)
Year	1995	2005	2015	2025
Count	424	409	488	454
Difference		−3.53%	+19.31%	−6.96%

Population statistic
Year	2024	2025
Count	458	454
Difference		−0.87%

It has a population of 454 people (31 December 2025).

=== Ethnicity ===
Census 2021 (1+ %)
Ethnicity	Number	Fraction
Hungarian	416	87.76%
Slovak	53	11.18%
Not found out	32	6.75%
Total	474	

In year 2021 was 474 people by ethnicity 416 as Hungarian, 53 as Slovak, 32 as Not found out, 4 as Romani, 3 as Czech and 1 as Russian.

Note on population: The difference values of population numbers in the table "Population statistic" and in the sections "Ethnicity" & "Religion" is caused by the use of various statistical methods.

=== Religion ===
Census 2021 (1+ %)
Religion	Number	Fraction
Calvinist Church	197	41.56%
None	163	34.39%
Roman Catholic Church	66	13.92%
Not found out	25	5.27%
Christian Congregations in Slovakia	7	1.48%
Evangelical Church	7	1.48%
Other	5	1.05%
Total	474	

In year 2021 was 474 people by religion 197 from Calvinist Church, 163 from None, 66 from Roman Catholic Church, 25 from Not found out, 7 from Christian Congregations in Slovakia, 7 from Evangelical Church, 5 from Other, 2 from Greek Catholic Church, 1 from Eastern Orthodox Church and 1 from Other and not ascertained christian church.

== Facilities ==
The village has a public library, and a football pitch.

== Genealogical resources ==
The records for genealogical research are available at the state archive "Statny Archiv in Bratislava, Slovakia"

== See also ==
- List of municipalities and towns in Slovakia
