= Trávnik =

Trávnik Komáromfüss
- Municipality
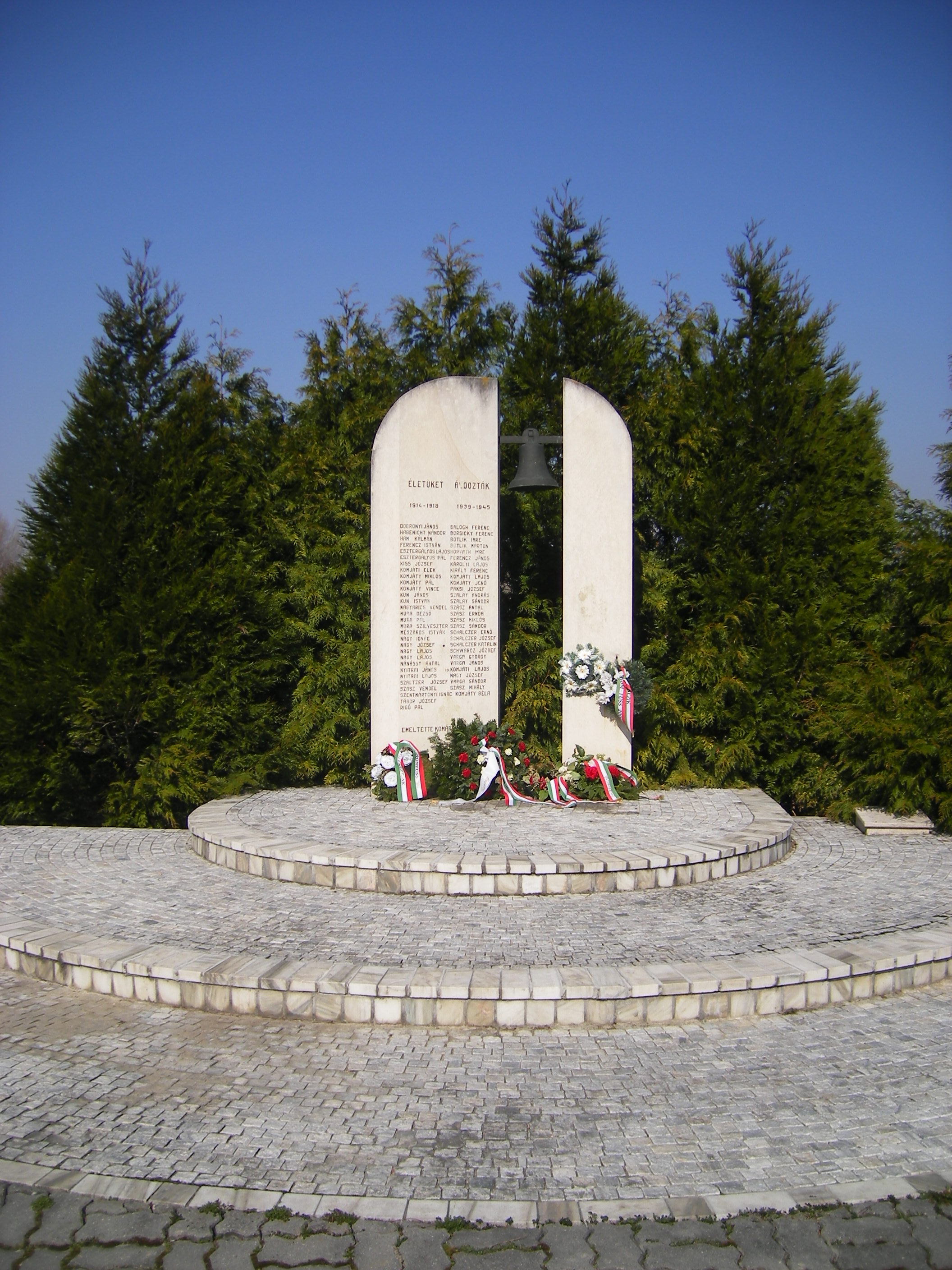
- Memorial to the local people killed in the World Wars

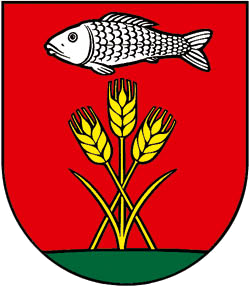
- Flag Coat of arms

- Location of Trávnik in the Nitra Region Location of Trávnik in Slovakia
- Coordinates: 47.78°N 17.80°E
- Country: Slovakia
- Region: Nitra Region
- District: Komárno District
- First mentioned: 1216

Government
  - Mayor: Károly Farkas (MOST-HÍD)

Area
  - Total: 18.73 km^{2} (7.23 sq mi)
- Elevation: 109 m (358 ft)

Population (2025)
  - Total: 639
- Time zone: UTC+1 (CET)
  - Summer (DST): UTC+2 (CEST)
- Postal code: 946 19
- Area code: +421 35
- Vehicle registration plate (until 2022): KN
- Website: obectravnik.eu

Trávnik (Hungarian: Komáromfüss or Füss, Hungarian pronunciation:[ˈkomaːromfyʃʃ]) is a village and municipality in the Komárno District in the Nitra Region of south-west Slovakia.

== Geography ==
The municipality lies at an altitude of 109 metres (358 ft) and covers an area of 18.73 km^{2} (7.23 sq mi) (2025).

== History ==
In the 9th century, the territory of Trávnik became part of the Kingdom of Hungary. In historical records the village was first mentioned in 1216. After the Austro-Hungarian army disintegrated in November 1918, Czechoslovak troops occupied the area, later acknowledged internationally by the Treaty of Trianon. Between 1938 and 1945 Trávnik was taken back by Miklós Horthy's Hungary through the First Vienna Award. From 1945 until the Velvet Divorce, it was part of Czechoslovakia. Since then it has been part of Slovakia.

== Population ==
Population statistic (10 years)
Year	1995	2005	2015	2025
Count	738	673	722	639
Difference		−8.80%	+7.28%	−11.49%

Population statistic
Year	2024	2025
Count	642	639
Difference		−0.46%

It has a population of 639 people (31 December 2025).

=== Ethnicity ===
Census 2021 (1+ %)
Ethnicity	Number	Fraction
Hungarian	576	84.33%
Slovak	106	15.51%
Not found out	43	6.29%
Total	683	

In year 2021 was 683 people by ethnicity 576 as Hungarian, 106 as Slovak, 43 as Not found out and 1 as Romani.

Note on population: The difference values of population numbers in the table "Population statistic" and in the sections "Ethnicity" & "Religion" is caused by the use of various statistical methods.

=== Religion ===
Census 2021 (1+ %)
Religion	Number	Fraction
Roman Catholic Church	306	44.8%
None	259	37.92%
Calvinist Church	53	7.76%
Not found out	34	4.98%
Evangelical Church	17	2.49%
Greek Catholic Church	10	1.46%
Total	683	

In year 2021 was 683 people by religion 306 from Roman Catholic Church, 259 from None, 53 from Calvinist Church, 34 from Not found out, 17 from Evangelical Church, 10 from Greek Catholic Church, 2 from Old Catholic Church, 1 from Jewish community and 1 from Other and not ascertained christian church.

== Facilities ==
The village has a public library and a football pitch.
