= Mudroňovo =

Mudroňovo Újpuszta
- Municipality
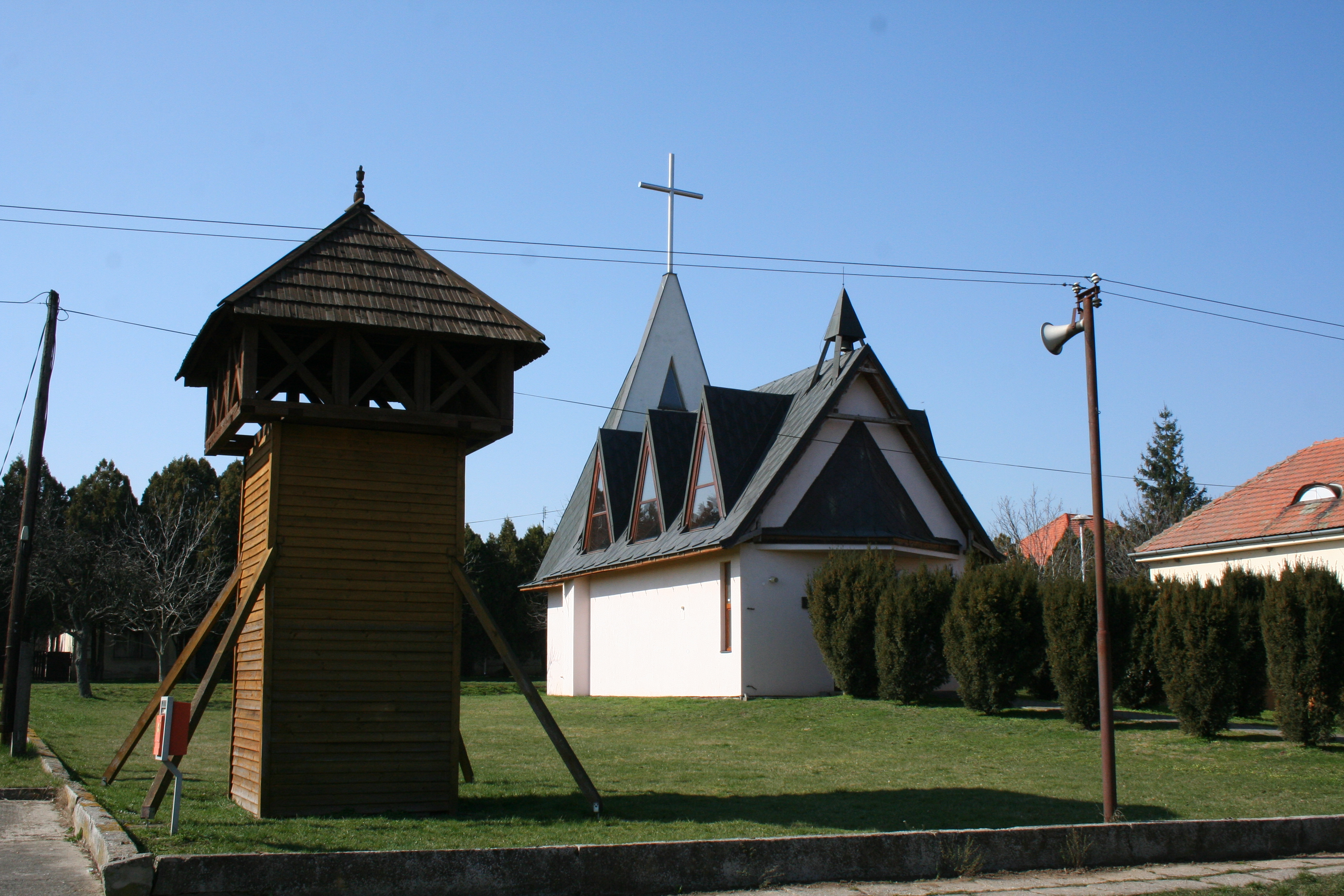
- Church of the Divine Mercy

- Flag Coat of arms

- Location of Mudroňovo in the Nitra Region Location of Mudroňovo in Slovakia
- Coordinates: 47.83°N 18.32°E
- Country: Slovakia
- Region: Nitra Region
- District: Komárno District
- First mentioned: 1921

Area
  - Total: 4.00 km^{2} (1.54 sq mi)
- Elevation: 157 m (515 ft)

Population (2025)
  - Total: 118
- Time zone: UTC+1 (CET)
  - Summer (DST): UTC+2 (CEST)
- Postal code: 946 32
- Area code: +421 35
- Vehicle registration plate (until 2022): KN

Mudroňovo (Hungarian: Újpuszta) is a small village and municipality in the Komárno District in the Nitra Region of south-west Slovakia.

== Geography ==
The municipality lies at an altitude of 157 metres (515 ft) and covers an area of 4.00 km^{2} (1.54 sq mi) (2025).

== History ==
In the 9th century, the territory of Mudroňovo became part of the Kingdom of Hungary. After the Austro-Hungarian army disintegrated in November 1918, Czechoslovak troops occupied the area, later acknowledged internationally by the Treaty of Trianon. The village was founded in 1921. Between 1938 and 1945 territory of Mudroňovo once more became part of Miklós Horthy's Hungary through the First Vienna Award. From 1945 until the Velvet Divorce, it was part of Czechoslovakia. Since then it has been part of Slovakia.

== Population ==
Population statistic (10 years)
Year	1995	2005	2015	2025
Count	88	112	122	118
Difference		+27.27%	+8.92%	−3.27%

Population statistic
Year	2024	2025
Count	124	118
Difference		−4.83%

It has a population of 118 people (31 December 2025).

=== Ethnicity ===
Census 2021 (1+ %)
Ethnicity	Number	Fraction
Slovak	108	87.09%
Hungarian	11	8.87%
Czech	6	4.83%
Russian	6	4.83%
Not found out	2	1.61%
Total	124	

In year 2021 was 124 people by ethnicity 108 as Slovak, 11 as Hungarian, 6 as Czech, 6 as Russian and 2 as Not found out.

Note on population: The difference values of population numbers in the table "Population statistic" and in the sections "Ethnicity" & "Religion" is caused by the use of various statistical methods.

=== Religion ===
Census 2021 (1+ %)
Religion	Number	Fraction
Roman Catholic Church	43	34.68%
None	36	29.03%
Evangelical Church	33	26.61%
Greek Catholic Church	8	6.45%
Not found out	3	2.42%
Total	124	

In year 2021 was 124 people by religion 43 from Roman Catholic Church, 36 from None, 33 from Evangelical Church, 8 from Greek Catholic Church, 3 from Not found out and 1 from Eastern Orthodox Church.

== Facilities ==
The village has a public library, and a football pitch.
