= Okoličná na Ostrove =

Okoličná na Ostrove Ekel
- Municipality
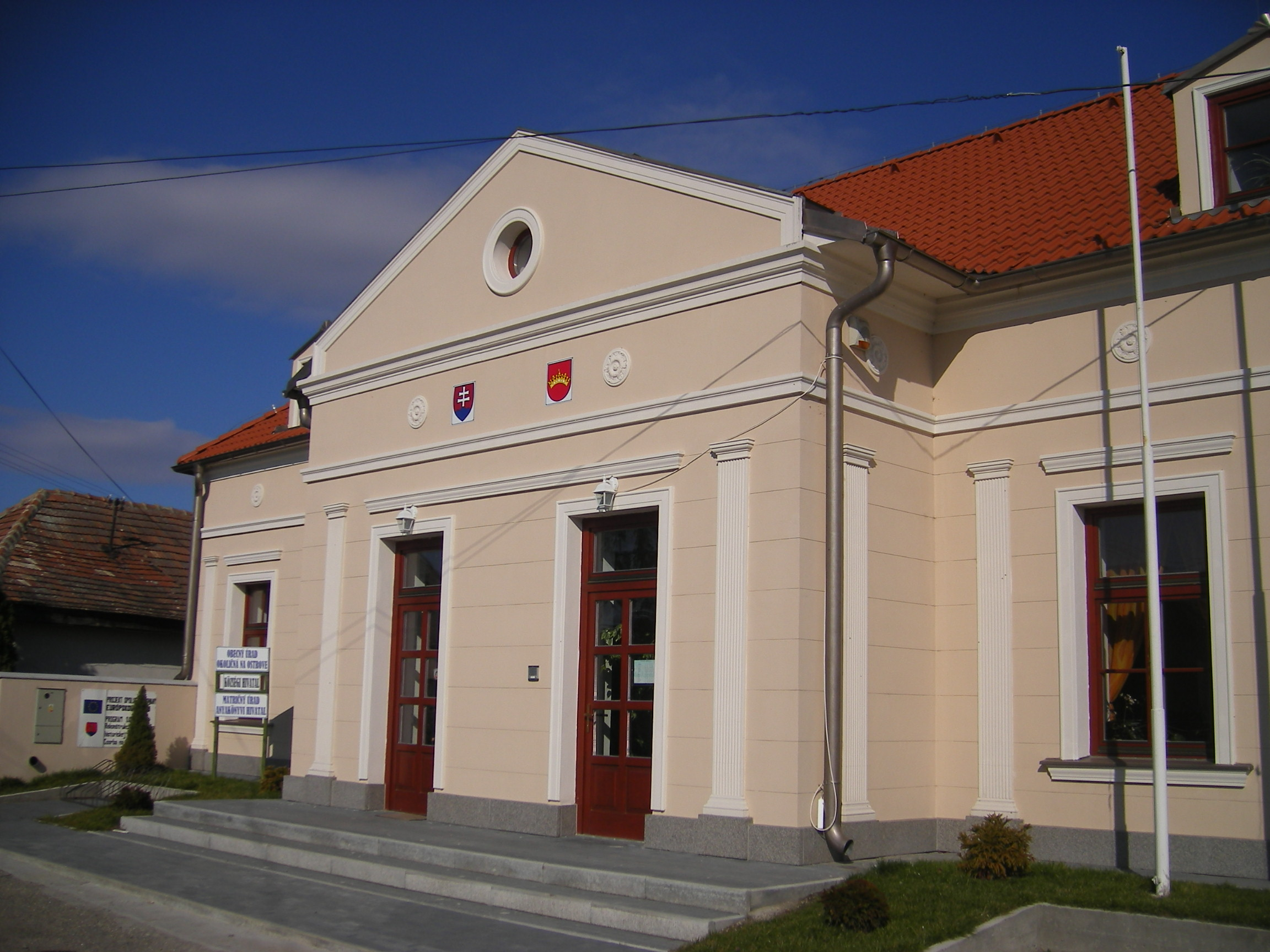
- Municipal office

- Flag Coat of arms

- Location of Okoličná na Ostrove in the Nitra Region Location of Okoličná na Ostrove in Slovakia
- Coordinates: 47.80°N 17.93°E
- Country: Slovakia
- Region: Nitra Region
- District: Komárno District
- First mentioned: 1229

Area
  - Total: 29.88 km^{2} (11.54 sq mi)
- Elevation: 110 m (360 ft)

Population (2025)
  - Total: 1,434
- Time zone: UTC+1 (CET)
  - Summer (DST): UTC+2 (CEST)
- Postal code: 946 13
- Area code: +421 35
- Vehicle registration plate (until 2022): KN
- Website: www.okolicnanaostrove.sk

Okoličná na Ostrove (Hungarian: Ekel, Hungarian pronunciation:[ˈɛkɛl]) is a village and municipality in the Komárno District in the Nitra Region of south-west Slovakia.

== Geography ==
The municipality lies at an altitude of 110 metres (360 ft) and covers an area of 29.88 km^{2} (11.54 sq mi) (2025).

== History ==
In the 9th century, the territory of Okoličná na Ostrove became part of the Kingdom of Hungary. In historical records the village was first mentioned in 1229. After the Austro-Hungarian army disintegrated in November 1918, Czechoslovak troops occupied the area, later acknowledged internationally by the Treaty of Trianon. Between 1938 and 1945 Okoličná na Ostrove once more became part of Miklós Horthy's Hungary through the First Vienna Award. From 1945 until the Velvet Divorce, it was part of Czechoslovakia. Since then it has been part of Slovakia.

== Population ==
Population statistic (10 years)
Year	1995	2005	2015	2025
Count	1451	1448	1509	1434
Difference		−0.20%	+4.21%	−4.97%

Population statistic
Year	2024	2025
Count	1442	1434
Difference		−0.55%

It has a population of 1434 people (31 December 2025).

=== Ethnicity ===
Census 2021 (1+ %)
Ethnicity	Number	Fraction
Hungarian	1186	82.36%
Slovak	268	18.61%
Not found out	49	3.4%
Total	1440	

In year 2021 was 1440 people by ethnicity 1186 as Hungarian, 268 as Slovak, 49 as Not found out, 9 as Czech, 4 as Polish, 3 as Italian, 3 as Romani, 3 as German, 1 as Serbian, 1 as Other and 1 as Albanian.

Note on population: The difference values of population numbers in the table "Population statistic" and in the sections "Ethnicity" & "Religion" is caused by the use of various statistical methods.

=== Religion ===
Census 2021 (1+ %)
Religion	Number	Fraction
Roman Catholic Church	557	38.68%
None	497	34.51%
Calvinist Church	287	19.93%
Not found out	35	2.43%
Evangelical Church	22	1.53%
Greek Catholic Church	17	1.18%
Total	1440	

In year 2021 was 1440 people by religion 557 from Roman Catholic Church, 497 from None, 287 from Calvinist Church, 35 from Not found out, 22 from Evangelical Church, 17 from Greek Catholic Church, 5 from Jehovah's Witnesses, 5 from Christian Congregations in Slovakia, 4 from Other and not ascertained christian church, 4 from Other, 3 from Old Catholic Church, 2 from Islam, 1 from Buddhism and 1 from Ad hoc movements.

The village is about 89% Hungarian, and 11% Slovak.

== Facilities ==
The village has a public library a gym and 3 football pitches.
