= Bodzianske Lúky =

Bodzianske Lúky Bogyarét
- Municipality
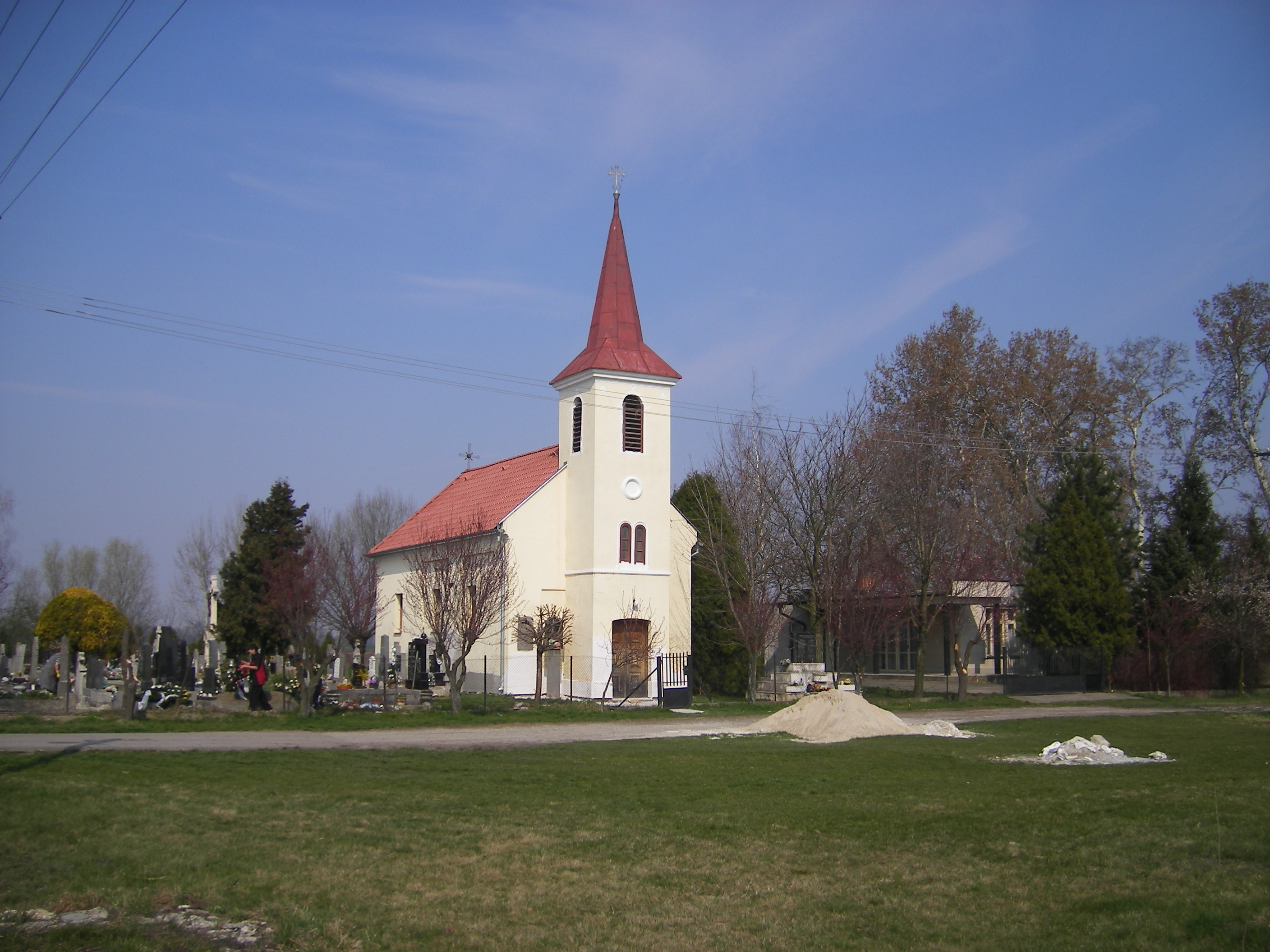
- Church of Our Lady of the Rosary

- Flag Coat of arms

- Location of Bodzianske Lúky in the Nitra Region Location of Bodzianske Lúky in Slovakia
- Coordinates: 47.89°N 17.90°E
- Country: Slovakia
- Region: Nitra Region
- District: Komárno District
- First mentioned: 1387

Government
  - Mayor: Mónika Aradi (SMK-MKP)

Area
  - Total: 5.16 km^{2} (1.99 sq mi)
- Elevation: 109 m (358 ft)

Population (2025)
  - Total: 174
- Time zone: UTC+1 (CET)
  - Summer (DST): UTC+2 (CEST)
- Postal code: 946 16
- Area code: +421 35
- Vehicle registration plate (until 2022): KN
- Website: www.bodzianskeluky.sk

Bodzianske Lúky (Hungarian: Bogyarét) is a village and municipality in the Komárno District in the Nitra Region of south-west Slovakia.

== Geography ==
The municipality lies at an altitude of 109 metres (358 ft) and covers an area of 5.16 km^{2} (1.99 sq mi) (2025).

== History ==
In the 9th century, the territory of Bodzianske Lúky became part of the Kingdom of Hungary. In historical records the village was first mentioned in 1387. After the Austro-Hungarian army disintegrated in November 1918, Czechoslovak troops occupied the area, later acknowledged internationally by the Treaty of Trianon. Between 1938 and 1945 Bodzianske Lúky once more became part of Miklós Horthy's Hungary through the First Vienna Award. From 1945 until the Velvet Divorce, it was part of Czechoslovakia. Since then it has been part of Slovakia.

== Population ==
Population statistic (10 years)
Year	1995	2005	2015	2025
Count	253	224	191	174
Difference		−11.46%	−14.73%	−8.90%

Population statistic
Year	2024	2025
Count	177	174
Difference		−1.69%

It has a population of 174 people (31 December 2025).

=== Ethnicity ===
Census 2021 (1+ %)
Ethnicity	Number	Fraction
Hungarian	167	87.43%
Slovak	21	10.99%
Not found out	19	9.94%
Total	191	

In year 2021 was 191 people by ethnicity 167 as Hungarian, 21 as Slovak, 19 as Not found out and 1 as Czech.

Note on population: The difference values of population numbers in the table "Population statistic" and in the sections "Ethnicity" & "Religion" is caused by the use of various statistical methods.

=== Religion ===
Census 2021 (1+ %)
Religion	Number	Fraction
Roman Catholic Church	126	65.97%
None	39	20.42%
Calvinist Church	14	7.33%
Not found out	11	5.76%
Total	191	

In year 2021 was 191 people by religion 126 from Roman Catholic Church, 39 from None, 14 from Calvinist Church, 11 from Not found out and 1 from Greek Catholic Church.

== Facilities ==
The village has a public library, and a football pitch.
