= Bodza =

Municipality of Slovakia

Bodza Bogya
- Municipality
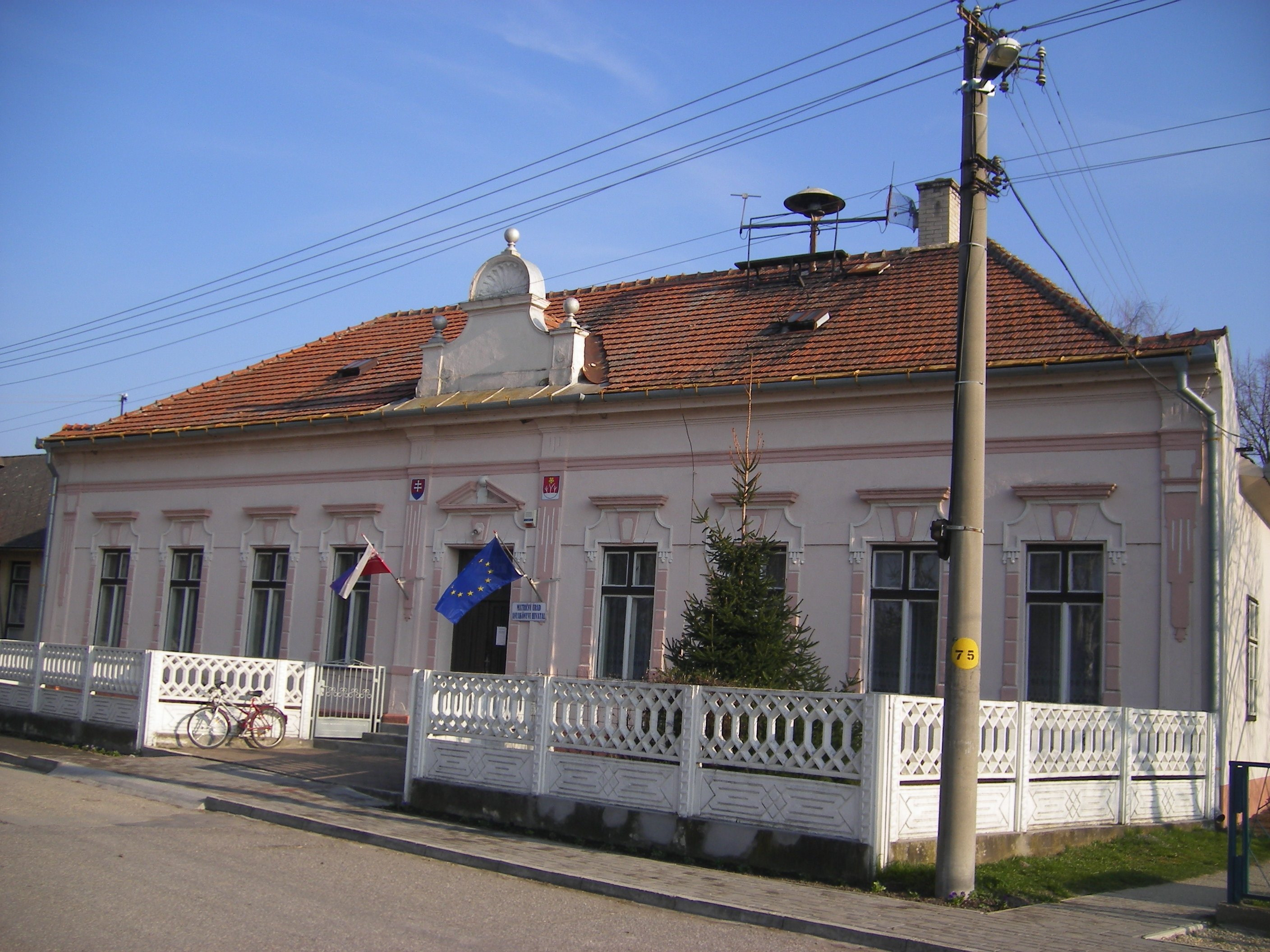
- Municipal office

- Flag Coat of arms

- Location of Bodza in the Nitra Region Location of Bodza in Slovakia
- Coordinates: 47.83°N 17.83°E
- Country: Slovakia
- Region: Nitra Region
- District: Komárno District
- First mentioned: 1387

Government
  - Mayor: Zuzana Fitosová (MOST-HÍD)

Area
  - Total: 6.31 km^{2} (2.44 sq mi)
- Elevation: 110 m (360 ft)

Population (2025)
  - Total: 385
- Time zone: UTC+1 (CET)
  - Summer (DST): UTC+2 (CEST)
- Postal code: 946 16
- Area code: +421 35
- Vehicle registration plate (until 2022): KN
- Website: www.bodza.sk

Bodza (Hungarian: Bogya, Hungarian pronunciation: [ˈboɟɒ]) is a village and municipality in the Komárno District in the Nitra Region of south-west Slovakia.

== Geography ==
The municipality lies at an altitude of 110 metres (360 ft) and covers an area of 6.31 km^{2} (2.44 sq mi) (2025).

== History ==
In the 9th century, the territory of Bodza became part of the Kingdom of Hungary. In historical records the village was first mentioned in 1245. After the Austro-Hungarian army disintegrated in November 1918, Czechoslovak troops occupied the area, later acknowledged internationally by the Treaty of Trianon. Between 1938 and 1945 Bodza once more became part of Miklós Horthy's Hungary through the First Vienna Award. From 1945 until the Velvet Divorce, it was part of Czechoslovakia. Since then it has been part of Slovakia.

== Population ==
Population statistic (10 years)
Year	1995	2005	2015	2025
Count	345	360	371	385
Difference		+4.34%	+3.05%	+3.77%

Population statistic
Year	2024	2025
Count	372	385
Difference		+3.49%

It has a population of 385 people (31 December 2025).

=== Ethnicity ===
Census 2021 (1+ %)
Ethnicity	Number	Fraction
Hungarian	310	81.36%
Slovak	63	16.53%
Not found out	29	7.61%
Total	381	

In year 2021 was 381 people by ethnicity 310 as Hungarian, 63 as Slovak, 29 as Not found out, 1 as Jewish and 1 as Romani.

Note on population: The difference values of population numbers in the table "Population statistic" and in the sections "Ethnicity" & "Religion" is caused by the use of various statistical methods.

=== Religion ===
Census 2021 (1+ %)
Religion	Number	Fraction
Calvinist Church	130	34.12%
None	129	33.86%
Roman Catholic Church	85	22.31%
Not found out	20	5.25%
Evangelical Church	5	1.31%
Greek Catholic Church	4	1.05%
Total	381	

In year 2021 was 381 people by religion 130 from Calvinist Church, 129 from None, 85 from Roman Catholic Church, 20 from Not found out, 5 from Evangelical Church, 4 from Greek Catholic Church, 3 from Ad hoc movements, 2 from Christian Congregations in Slovakia, 1 from Paganism and natural spirituality, 1 from Jehovah's Witnesses and 1 from Other.

== Facilities ==
The village has a football pitch.

== Genealogical resources ==
The records for genealogical research are available at the state archive "Statny Archiv in Bratislava, Nitra, Slovakia"

- Roman Catholic church records (births/marriages/deaths): 1750-1939 (parish B)
- Reformated church records (births/marriages/deaths): 1783-1918 (parish B)

== See also ==
- List of municipalities and towns in Slovakia
