= Sokolce =

Sokolce Lakszakállas
- Municipality
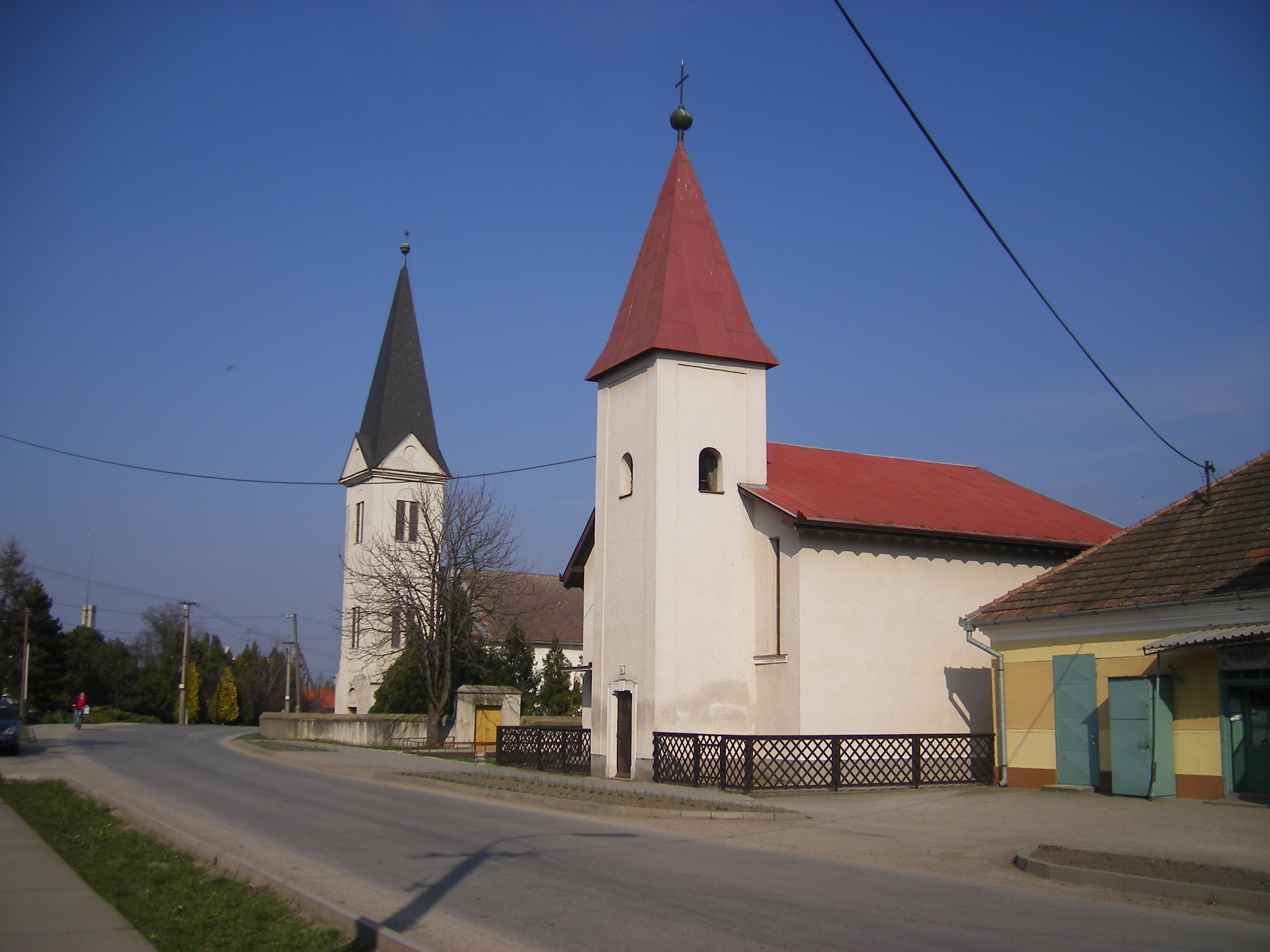
- Reformed church (left) and Catholic church (right)

- Flag Coat of arms

- Location of Sokolce in the Nitra Region Location of Sokolce in Slovakia
- Coordinates: 47.85°N 17.83°E
- Country: Slovakia
- Region: Nitra Region
- District: Komárno District
- First mentioned: 1332

Area
  - Total: 19.42 km^{2} (7.50 sq mi)
- Elevation: 110 m (360 ft)

Population (2025)
  - Total: 1,189
- Time zone: UTC+1 (CET)
  - Summer (DST): UTC+2 (CEST)
- Postal code: 946 17
- Area code: +421 35
- Vehicle registration plate (until 2022): KN
- Website: www.obecsokolce.sk

Sokolce (Hungarian: Lakszakállas, Hungarian pronunciation:[ˈlɒksɒkaːllɒʃ]) is a village and municipality in the Komárno District in the Nitra Region of south-west Slovakia.

== Geography ==
The municipality lies at an altitude of 110 metres (360 ft) and covers an area of 19.42 km^{2} (7.50 sq mi) (2025).

== History ==
In the 9th century, the territory of Sokolce became part of the Kingdom of Hungary. In historical records the village was first mentioned in 1332.

After the Austro-Hungarian army disintegrated in November 1918, Czechoslovak troops occupied the area, later acknowledged internationally by the Treaty of Trianon.

Between 1938 and 1945 Sokolce once more became part of Miklós Horthy's Hungary through the First Vienna Award. From 1945 until the Velvet Divorce, it was part of Czechoslovakia. Since then it has been part of Slovakia.

== Population ==
Population statistic (10 years)
Year	1995	2005	2015	2025
Count	1270	1280	1209	1189
Difference		+0.78%	−5.54%	−1.65%

Population statistic
Year	2024	2025
Count	1194	1189
Difference		−0.41%

It has a population of 1189 people (31 December 2025).

=== Ethnicity ===
Census 2021 (1+ %)
Ethnicity	Number	Fraction
Hungarian	1045	86.86%
Not found out	107	8.89%
Slovak	102	8.47%
Total	1203	

In year 2021 was 1203 people by ethnicity 1045 as Hungarian, 107 as Not found out, 102 as Slovak, 6 as Romani, 3 as Czech, 1 as Romanian and 1 as Polish.

Note on population: The difference values of population numbers in the table "Population statistic" and in the sections "Ethnicity" & "Religion" is caused by the use of various statistical methods.

=== Religion ===
Census 2021 (1+ %)
Religion	Number	Fraction
None	427	35.49%
Roman Catholic Church	403	33.5%
Calvinist Church	249	20.7%
Not found out	83	6.9%
Evangelical Church	20	1.66%
Greek Catholic Church	18	1.5%
Total	1203	

In year 2021 was 1203 people by religion 427 from None, 403 from Roman Catholic Church, 249 from Calvinist Church, 83 from Not found out, 20 from Evangelical Church, 18 from Greek Catholic Church, 2 from Christian Congregations in Slovakia and 1 from Other and not ascertained christian church.

== Facilities ==
The village has a public library, a gym and a football pitch.
