= Bátorove Kosihy =

Bátorove Kosihy Bátorkeszi
- Municipality
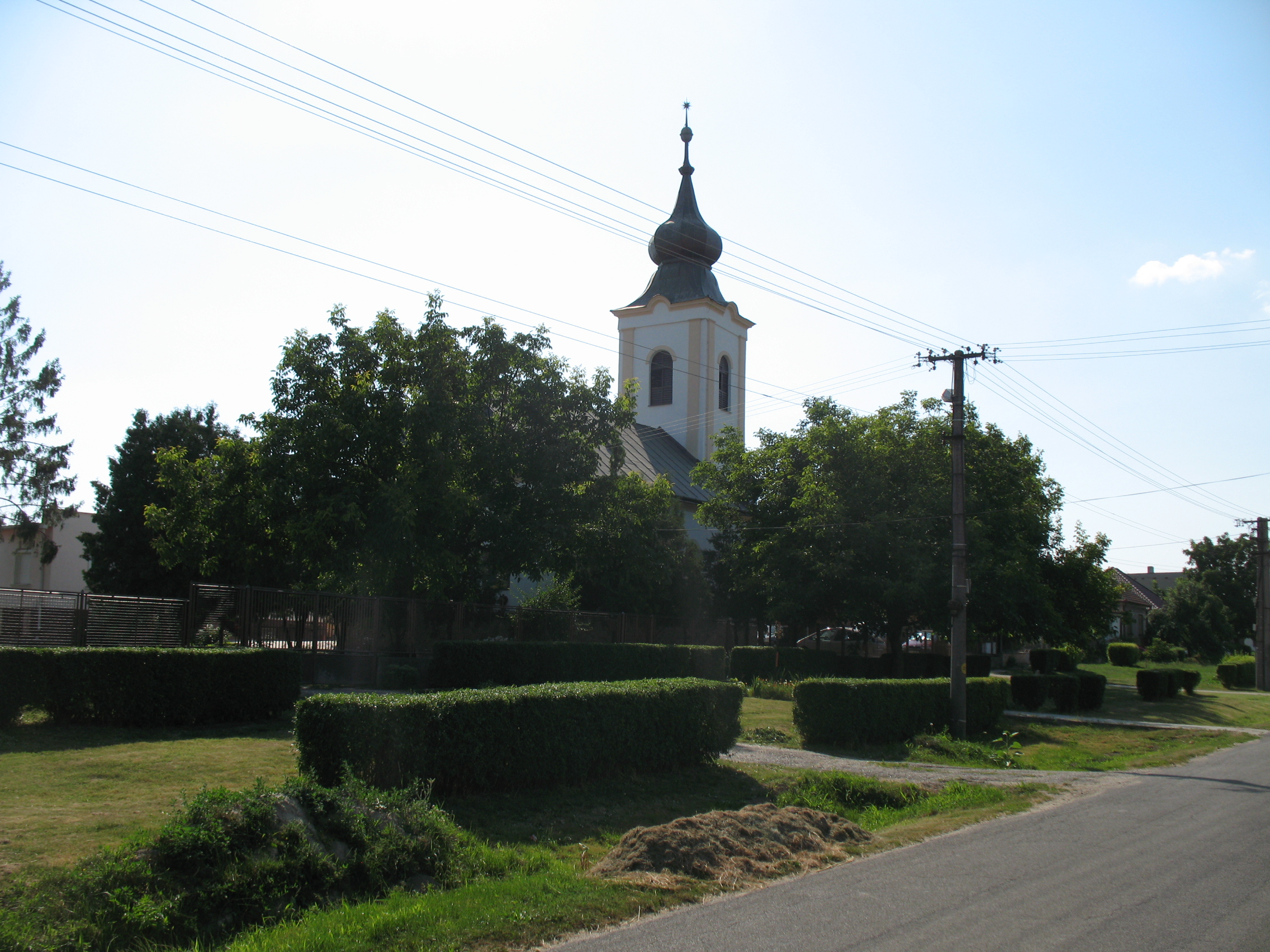
- Church of the Visitation of the Virgin Mary

- Coat of arms

- Location of Bajč in the Nitra Region Location of Bajč in Slovakia
- Coordinates: 47°49′51″N 18°24′39″E
- Country: Slovakia
- Region: Nitra Region
- District: Komárno District
- First mentioned: 1156
- Named for: Bátor refers to the Báthory-family, Keszi is the name of a Hungarian tribe

Government
  - Mayor: Roland Labancz (SMK-MKP)

Area
  - Total: 45.88 km^{2} (17.71 sq mi)
- Elevation: 132 m (433 ft)

Population (2025)
  - Total: 3,296

Ethnicity
  - Hungarians: 83,38 %
  - Slovaks: 15,59
- Time zone: UTC+1 (CET)
  - Summer (DST): UTC+2 (CEST)
- Postal code: 946 34
- Area code: +421 35
- Vehicle registration plate (until 2022): KN
- Website: www.batorovekosihy.sk (in Hungarian and Slovak)

Bátorove Kosihy (Hungarian: Bátorkeszi, Hungarian pronunciation:[ˈbaːtorkɛsi]) is a village and municipality in the Komárno District in the Nitra Region of south-west Slovakia.

== Etymology ==
The village was named after the Magyar tribe Keszi.

== History ==
It was inhabited by the Avars as shown by an 8th-century cemetery found by archeologists. The village was first recorded in 1156 by its Hungarian name as villa Kesceu. In the 16th century, it became the estate of the Báthory-family, which is reflected by its name.

Until the end of World War I, the village was part of Hungary and fell within the Párkány district of Esztergom. After the Austro-Hungarian army disintegrated in November 1918, Czechoslovak troops occupied the area. After the Treaty of Trianon of 1920, the village became officially part of Czechoslovakia. In November 1938, the First Vienna Award granted the area to Hungary and it was held by Hungary until 1945. After Soviet occupation in 1945, Czechoslovak administration returned and the village became officially part of Czechoslovakia in 1947.

== Geography ==
The municipality lies at an altitude of 132 metres (433 ft) and covers an area of 45.88 km^{2} (17.71 sq mi) (2025).

== Population ==
Population statistic (10 years)
Year	1995	2005	2015	2025
Count	3584	3481	3398	3296
Difference		−2.87%	−2.38%	−3.00%

Population statistic
Year	2024	2025
Count	3291	3296
Difference		+0.15%

It has a population of 3296 people (31 December 2025).

In 1910, the village had 3144, for the most part, Hungarian inhabitants. At the 2001 Census the recorded population of the village was 3514 while an end-2008 estimate by the Statistical Office had the village's population also as 3475. As of 2001, 83,38 per cent of its population was Hungarian while 15,59 per cent was Slovak.

Roman Catholicism is the majority religion of the village, its adherents numbering 66.68% of the total population.

== Facilities ==
The village has a public library, a gym and a football pitch. It also has a DVD rental store.

== Twinnings ==
The village is twinned with:

- Bakonyszentlászló, Hungary
