= Klížska Nemá =

Klížska Nemá Kolozsnéma
- Municipality
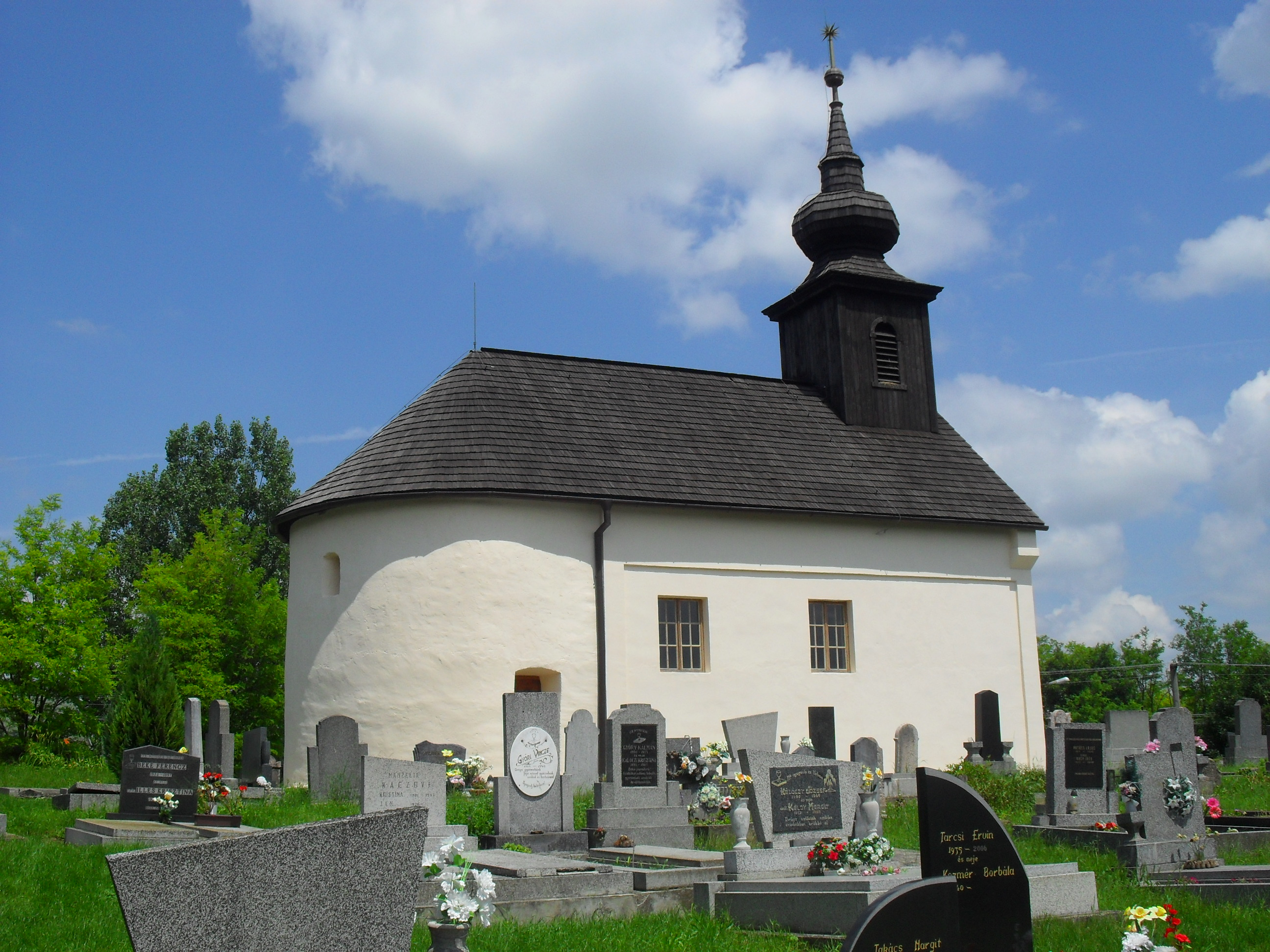
- Reformed church

- Flag Coat of arms

- Location of Klížska Nemá in the Nitra Region Location of Klížska Nemá in Slovakia
- Coordinates: 47.75°N 17.82°E
- Country: Slovakia
- Region: Nitra Region
- District: Komárno District
- First mentioned: 1268

Government
  - Mayor: Rozália Szalay (SMK-MKP)

Area
  - Total: 11.80 km^{2} (4.56 sq mi)
- Elevation: 111 m (364 ft)

Population (2025)
  - Total: 422
- Time zone: UTC+1 (CET)
  - Summer (DST): UTC+2 (CEST)
- Postal code: 946 20
- Area code: +421 35
- Vehicle registration plate (until 2022): KN
- Website: www.klizskanema.sk

Klížska Nemá (Hungarian: Kolozsnéma, pronounced: [ˈkoloʒneːmɒ]) is a village and municipality in the Komárno District in the Nitra Region of south-west Slovakia.

== Geography ==
The municipality lies at an altitude of 111 metres (364 ft) and covers an area of 11.80 km^{2} (4.56 sq mi) (2025).

== History ==
In the 9th century, the territory of Boldog became part of the Kingdom of Hungary. In historical records the village was first mentioned in 1268. After the Austro-Hungarian army disintegrated in November 1918, Czechoslovak troops occupied the area, later acknowledged internationally by the Treaty of Trianon. Between 1938 and 1945 Boldog once more became part of Miklós Horthy's Hungary through the First Vienna Award. From 1945 until the Velvet Divorce, it was part of Czechoslovakia. Since then it has been part of Slovakia.

== Population ==
Population statistic (10 years)
Year	1995	2005	2015	2025
Count	577	521	502	422
Difference		−9.70%	−3.64%	−15.93%

Population statistic
Year	2024	2025
Count	426	422
Difference		−0.93%

It has a population of 422 people (31 December 2025).

=== Ethnicity ===
Census 2021 (1+ %)
Ethnicity	Number	Fraction
Hungarian	387	86.19%
Slovak	65	14.47%
Not found out	36	8.01%
Total	449	

In year 2021 was 449 people by ethnicity 387 as Hungarian, 65 as Slovak, 36 as Not found out, 1 as Czech, 1 as Romani, 1 as Russian, 1 as Austrian, 1 as Polish and 1 as German.

Note on population: The difference values of population numbers in the table "Population statistic" and in the sections "Ethnicity" & "Religion" is caused by the use of various statistical methods.

=== Religion ===
Census 2021 (1+ %)
Religion	Number	Fraction
Roman Catholic Church	229	51%
None	122	27.17%
Calvinist Church	62	13.81%
Not found out	24	5.35%
Evangelical Church	6	1.34%
Total	449	

In year 2021 was 449 people by religion 229 from Roman Catholic Church, 122 from None, 62 from Calvinist Church, 24 from Not found out, 6 from Evangelical Church, 4 from Greek Catholic Church, 1 from Eastern Orthodox Church and 1 from Other and not ascertained christian church.

The village is about 93% Hungarian, 7% Slovak.

== Facilities ==
The village has a public library and a football pitch.

== See also ==
- List of municipalities and towns in Slovakia
