= Bajč =

Bajč Bajcs
- Municipality
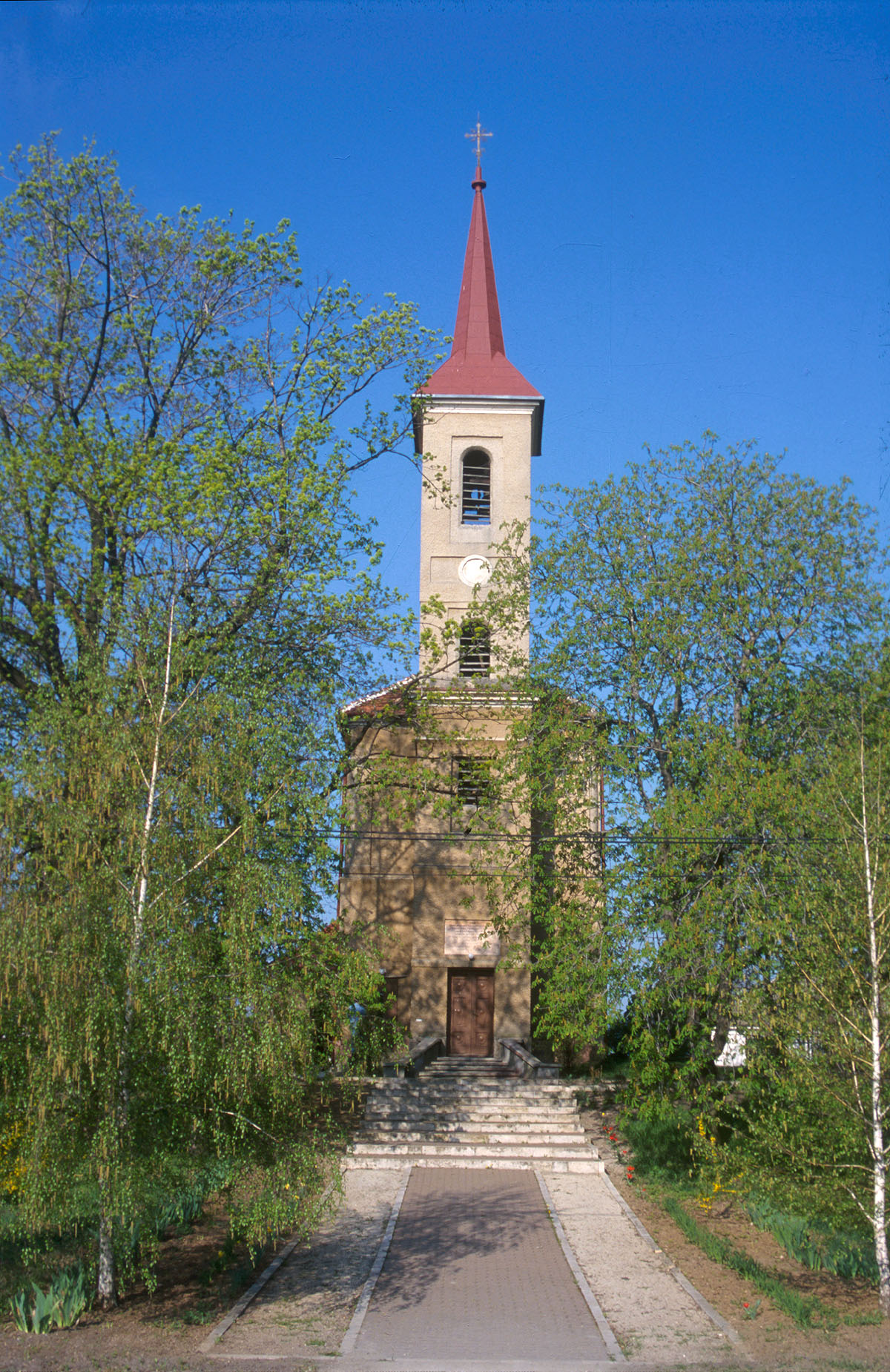
- Church of Saint John the Baptist

- Flag Coat of arms

- Location of Bajč in the Nitra Region Location of Bajč in Slovakia
- Coordinates: 47°55′N 18°13′E
- Country: Slovakia
- Region: Nitra Region
- District: Komárno District
- First mentioned: 1312

Area
  - Total: 36.47 km^{2} (14.08 sq mi)
- Elevation: 121 m (397 ft)

Population (2025)
  - Total: 1,276
- Time zone: UTC+1 (CET)
  - Summer (DST): UTC+2 (CEST)
- Postal code: 946 54
- Area code: +421 35
- Vehicle registration plate (until 2022): KN
- Website: www.ocubajc.sk

Bajč (Hungarian: Bajcs) is a village and municipality in the Komárno District in the Nitra Region of south-west Slovakia.

== Geography ==
The municipality lies at an altitude of 121 metres (397 ft) and covers an area of 36.47 km^{2} (14.08 sq mi) (2025).

== History ==
In the 9th century, the territory of Bajč became part of the Kingdom of Hungary. In historical records the village was first mentioned in 1312. After the Austro-Hungarian army disintegrated in November 1918, Czechoslovak troops occupied the area, later acknowledged internationally by the Treaty of Trianon. Between 1938 and 1945 Bajč once more became part of Miklós Horthy's Hungary through the First Vienna Award. From 1945 until the Velvet Divorce, it was part of Czechoslovakia. Since then it has been part of Slovakia.

== Population ==
Population statistic (10 years)
| Year | 1995 | 2005 | 2015 | 2025 |
|---|---|---|---|---|
| Count | 1235 | 1262 | 1248 | 1276 |
| Difference | | +2.18% | −1.10% | +2.24% |

Population statistic
| Year | 2024 | 2025 |
|---|---|---|
| Count | 1266 | 1276 |
| Difference | | +0.78% |

It has a population of 1276 people (31 December 2025).

=== Ethnicity ===
Census 2021 (1+ %)
| Ethnicity | Number | Fraction |
|---|---|---|
| Slovak | 634 | 51.83% |
| Hungarian | 559 | 45.7% |
| Not found out | 138 | 11.28% |
| Romani | 13 | 1.06% |
| Total | 1223 | |

In year 2021 was 1223 people by ethnicity 634 as Slovak, 559 as Hungarian, 138 as Not found out, 13 as Romani, 5 as Czech, 3 as Irish, 2 as Russian, 1 as Ukrainian, 1 as German, 1 as Other and 1 as French.

Note on population: The difference values of population numbers in the table "Population statistic" and in the sections "Ethnicity" & "Religion" is caused by the use of various statistical methods.

=== Religion ===
Census 2021 (1+ %)
| Religion | Number | Fraction |
|---|---|---|
| Roman Catholic Church | 683 | 55.85% |
| None | 326 | 26.66% |
| Not found out | 127 | 10.38% |
| Calvinist Church | 32 | 2.62% |
| Evangelical Church | 20 | 1.64% |
| Greek Catholic Church | 14 | 1.14% |
| Total | 1223 | |

In year 2021 was 1223 people by religion 683 from Roman Catholic Church, 326 from None, 127 from Not found out, 32 from Calvinist Church, 20 from Evangelical Church, 14 from Greek Catholic Church, 4 from Christian Congregations in Slovakia, 3 from United Methodist Church, 2 from Jehovah's Witnesses, 2 from Other, 2 from Baptists Church, 2 from Apostolic Church, 1 from Eastern Orthodox Church, 1 from Islam, 1 from Church of the Brethren, 1 from Seventh-day Adventist Church, 1 from Buddhism and 1 from Ad hoc movements.

== Genealogical resources ==
The records for genealogical research are available at the state archive in Nitra (Slovak: Štátny archív v Nitre).

- Roman Catholic church records (births/marriages/deaths): 1827-1895 (parish A)
- Reformated church records (births/marriages/deaths): 1795-1942
- Census records 1869 of Bajc are available at the state archive.

== See also ==
- List of municipalities and towns in Slovakia

== Facilities ==
The village has a public library, and a football pitch.
