= Dedina Mládeže =

Dedina Mládeže Ifjúságfalva
- Municipality
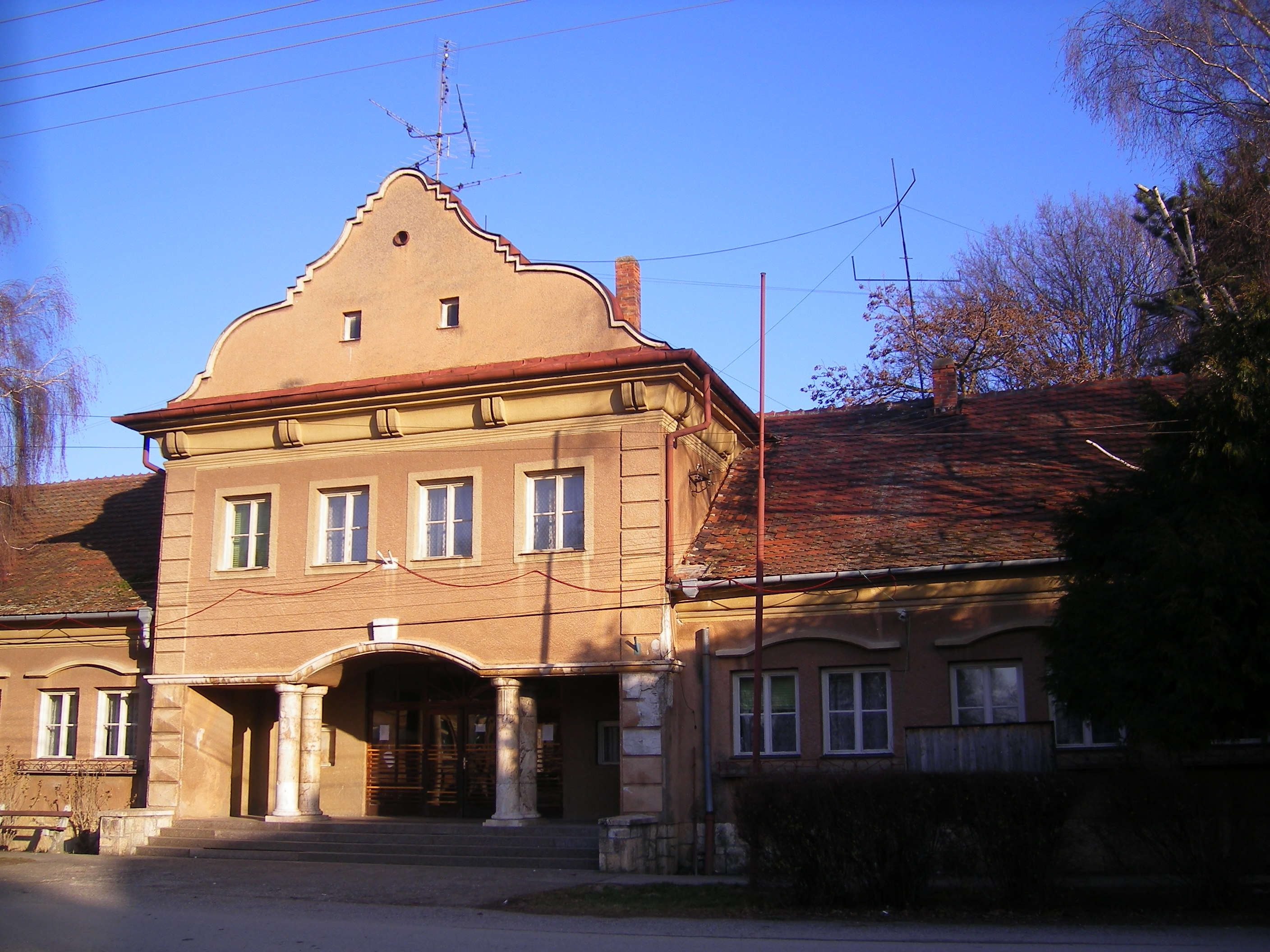
- House of Culture in the village

- Flag Coat of arms

- Location of Dedina Mládeže in the Nitra Region Location of Dedina Mládeže in Slovakia
- Coordinates: 47.95°N 18.00°E
- Country: Slovakia
- Region: Nitra Region
- District: Komárno District
- First mentioned: 1954

Government
  - Mayor: Gabriella Gönczöl (MOST-HÍD)

Area
  - Total: 12.78 km^{2} (4.93 sq mi)
- Elevation: 110 m (360 ft)

Population (2025)
  - Total: 403
- Time zone: UTC+1 (CET)
  - Summer (DST): UTC+2 (CEST)
- Postal code: 946 03
- Area code: +421 35
- Vehicle registration plate (until 2022): KN
- Website: www.obecdedinamladeze.sk

Dedina Mládeže (lit. 'Village of the Youth'; Hungarian: Ifjúságfalva) is a village and municipality in Slovakia, with a population of 514.

== Geography ==
The municipality lies at an altitude of 110 metres (360 ft) and covers an area of 12.78 km^{2} (4.93 sq mi) (2025).

River Váh is located north from the town, and near the river, there is a natural area, with beautiful forests. This area has a fauna and flora, which is typical for meadow forests. In the centre of the village there are monumental buildings : the school and the town hall. One can do water sports here too.

== History ==
In the 9th century, the territory of Dedina Mládeže became part of the Kingdom of Hungary. After the Austro-Hungarian army disintegrated in November 1918, Czechoslovak troops occupied the area, later acknowledged internationally by the Treaty of Trianon. Between 1938 and 1945 territory of Dedina Mládeže once more became part of Miklós Horthy's Hungary through the First Vienna Award. From 1945 until the Velvet Divorce, it was part of Czechoslovakia. Since then it has been part of Slovakia.

The village was founded by youth volunteers building the Trať Mládeže in 1949 as a settlement within Kolárovo. In 1954, it became an independent settlement, which however also included parts of the villages Komoča, Neded and Zemné.

== Population ==
Population statistic (10 years)
Year	1995	2005	2015	2025
Count	527	494	457	403
Difference		−6.26%	−7.48%	−11.81%

Population statistic
Year	2024	2025
Count	415	403
Difference		−2.89%

It has a population of 403 people (31 December 2025).

=== Ethnicity ===
Census 2021 (1+ %)
Ethnicity	Number	Fraction
Hungarian	252	57.53%
Slovak	179	40.86%
Not found out	24	5.47%
Total	438	

In year 2021 was 438 people by ethnicity 252 as Hungarian, 179 as Slovak, 24 as Not found out, 4 as Other, 2 as Romani and 1 as Czech.

Note on population: The difference values of population numbers in the table "Population statistic" and in the sections "Ethnicity" & "Religion" is caused by the use of various statistical methods.

=== Religion ===
Census 2021 (1+ %)
Religion	Number	Fraction
None	195	44.52%
Roman Catholic Church	177	40.41%
Not found out	23	5.25%
Evangelical Church	15	3.42%
Calvinist Church	10	2.28%
Jehovah's Witnesses	5	1.14%
Greek Catholic Church	5	1.14%
Total	438	

In year 2021 was 438 people by religion 195 from None, 177 from Roman Catholic Church, 23 from Not found out, 15 from Evangelical Church, 10 from Calvinist Church, 5 from Jehovah's Witnesses, 5 from Greek Catholic Church, 3 from Christian Congregations in Slovakia, 2 from Other, 2 from Buddhism and 1 from Eastern Orthodox Church.

== Accommodation ==
There are many typical rustic houses where one can stay for night.

== Transport ==
- car : the village is located near the road from Kolárovo to Šaľa, and it is only 5 kilometres (3 miles) from Kolárovo
- bus : Dedina Mládeže has a bus connection with Kolárovo and Šaľa
- there was a plan to build a railway connection from Kolárovo to Neded across Dedina Mládeže, but it's still not complete
