= Vrbová nad Váhom =

Village in Nitra Region, Slovakia

Vrbová nad Váhom Vágfüzes
- Municipality
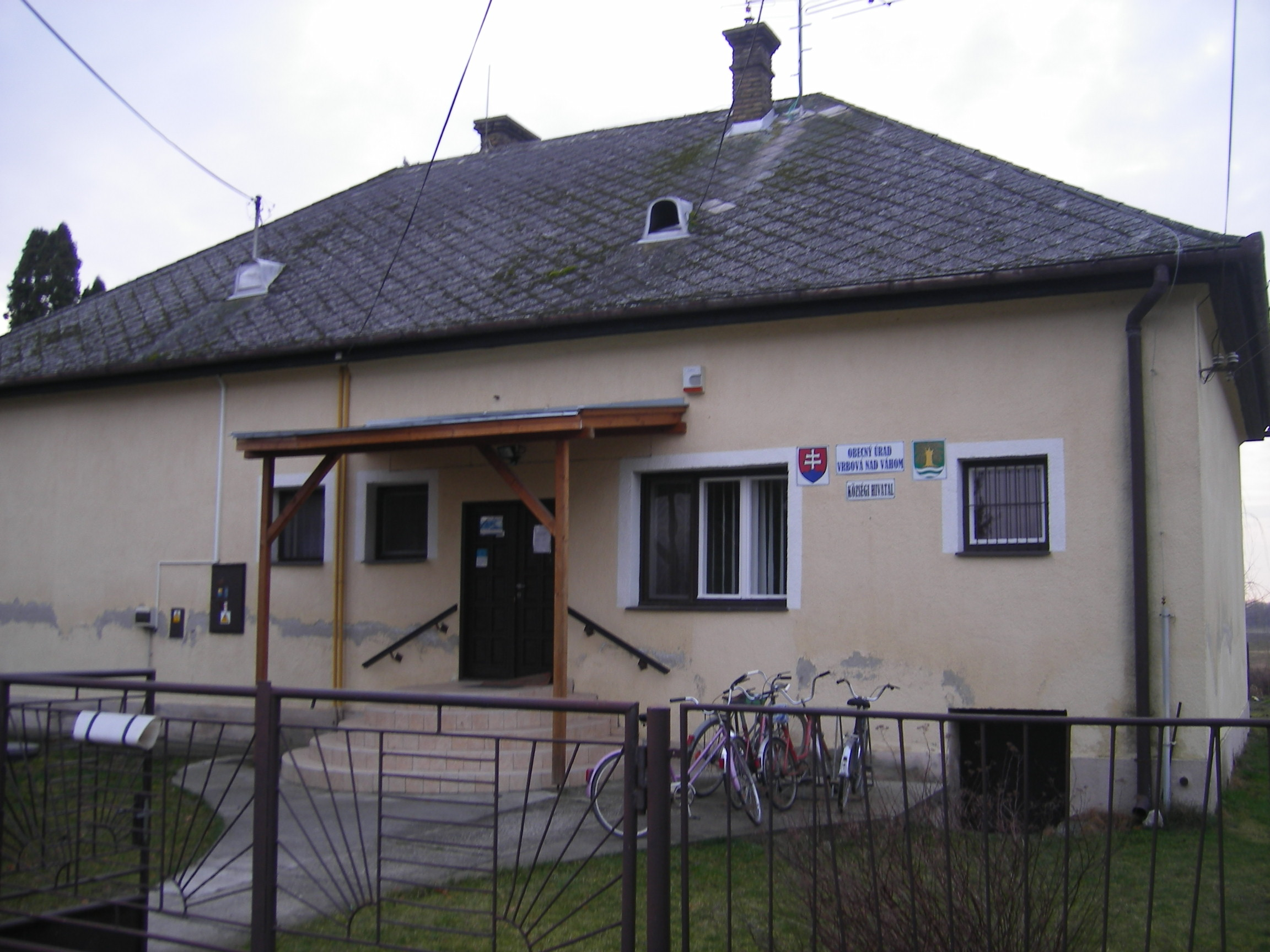
- Municipal office

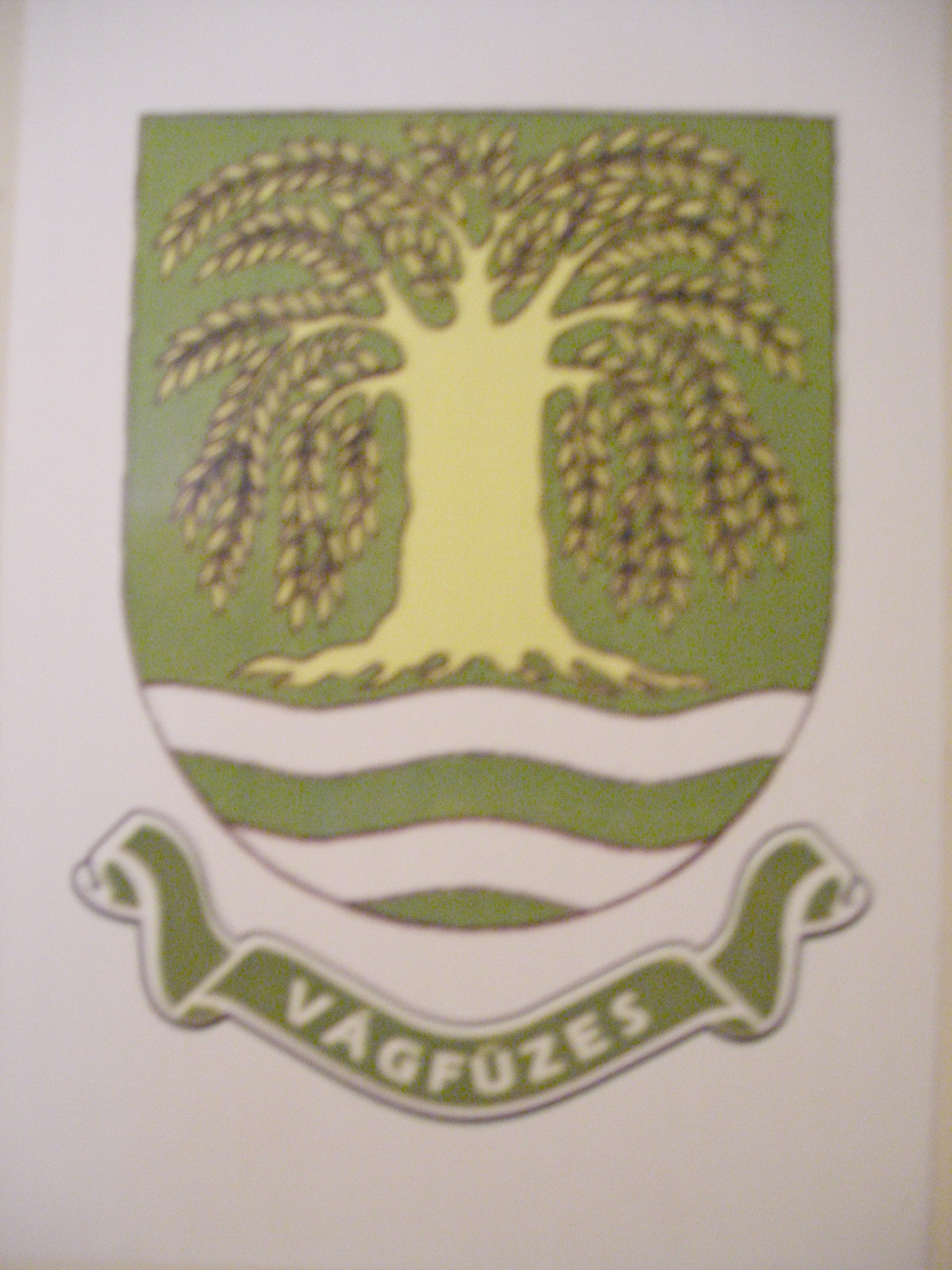
- Flag Coat of arms

- Location of Vrbová nad Váhom in the Nitra Region Location of Vrbová nad Váhom in Slovakia
- Coordinates: 47.85°N 18.05°E
- Country: Slovakia
- Region: Nitra Region
- District: Komárno District
- First mentioned: 1268

Area
  - Total: 21.69 km^{2} (8.37 sq mi)
- Elevation: 109 m (358 ft)

Population (2025)
  - Total: 536
- Time zone: UTC+1 (CET)
  - Summer (DST): UTC+2 (CEST)
- Postal code: 946 65
- Area code: +421 35
- Vehicle registration plate (until 2022): KN
- Website: www.obecvrbova.sk

Vrbová nad Váhom (Hungarian: Vágfüzes, Hungarian pronunciation:[ˈvaːɡfyzɛʃ]) is a village and municipality in the Komárno District in the Nitra Region of south-west Slovakia. It lies on the Váh River.

== Geography ==
The municipality lies at an altitude of 109 metres (358 ft) and covers an area of 21.69 km^{2} (8.37 sq mi) (2025).

== History ==
In the 9th century, the territory of Vrbová nad Váhom became part of the Kingdom of Hungary. After the Austro-Hungarian army disintegrated in November 1918, Czechoslovak troops occupied the area, later acknowledged internationally by the Treaty of Trianon. Between 1938 and 1945 territory of Vrbová nad Váhom once more became part of Miklós Horthy's Hungary through the First Vienna Award. From 1945 until the Velvet Divorce, it was part of Czechoslovakia. Since then it has been part of Slovakia. The village was formed in 1968 from parts of Kameničná and Martovce.

== Population ==
Population statistic (10 years)
Year	1995	2005	2015	2025
Count	558	547	550	536
Difference		−1.97%	+0.54%	−2.54%

Population statistic
Year	2024	2025
Count	537	536
Difference		−0.18%

It has a population of 536 people (31 December 2025).

=== Ethnicity ===
Census 2021 (1+ %)
Ethnicity	Number	Fraction
Hungarian	445	81.95%
Slovak	86	15.83%
Not found out	27	4.97%
Romani	23	4.23%
Total	543	

In year 2021 was 543 people by ethnicity 445 as Hungarian, 86 as Slovak, 27 as Not found out, 23 as Romani, 4 as Czech, 1 as Serbian, 1 as Silesian, 1 as Rusyn, 1 as Polish, 1 as Moravian, 1 as Greek, 1 as French and 1 as Croatian.

Note on population: The difference values of population numbers in the table "Population statistic" and in the sections "Ethnicity" & "Religion" is caused by the use of various statistical methods.

=== Religion ===
Census 2021 (1+ %)
Religion	Number	Fraction
Roman Catholic Church	309	56.91%
None	153	28.18%
Not found out	35	6.45%
Calvinist Church	31	5.71%
Greek Catholic Church	6	1.1%
Total	543	

In year 2021 was 543 people by religion 309 from Roman Catholic Church, 153 from None, 35 from Not found out, 31 from Calvinist Church, 6 from Greek Catholic Church, 3 from Evangelical Church, 2 from Old Catholic Church, 2 from Jehovah's Witnesses, 1 from Other and not ascertained christian church and 1 from Christian Congregations in Slovakia.

== Facilities ==
The village has a public library, and a football pitch.
