= Búč =

Búč Búcs
- Municipality
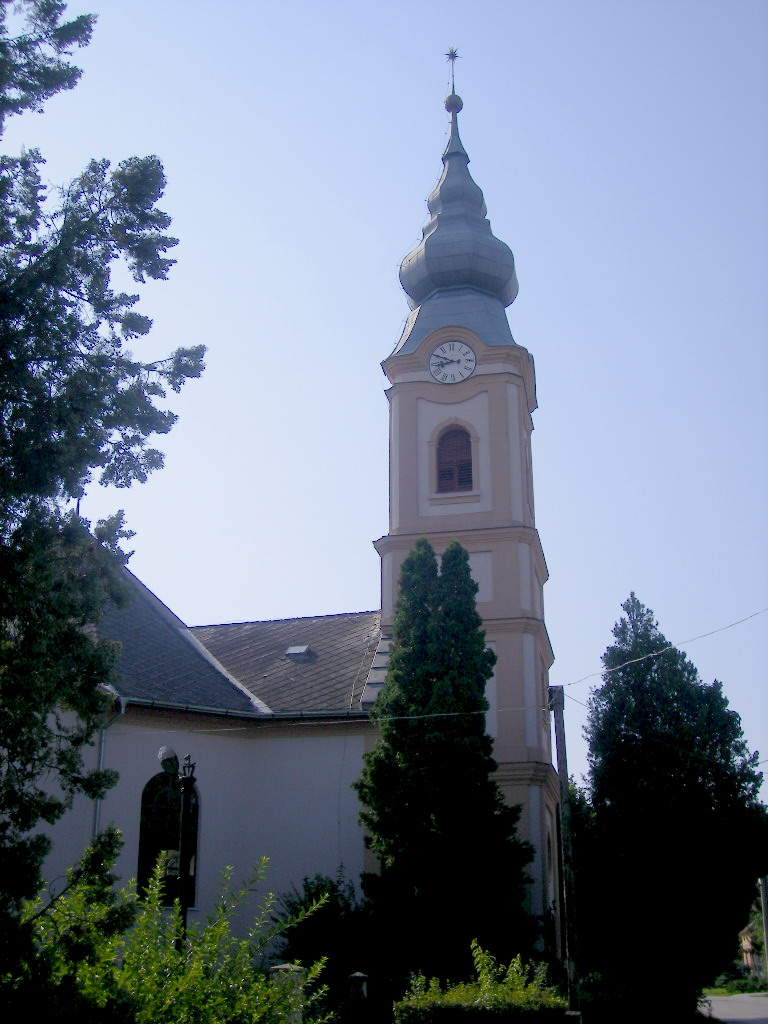
- Protestant church in the village

- Flag Coat of arms

- Location of Búč in the Nitra Region Location of Búč in Slovakia
- Coordinates: 47°48′29″N 18°26′48″E
- Country: Slovakia
- Region: Nitra Region
- District: Komárno District
- First mentioned: 1208

Government
  - Mayor: János Karkó

Area
  - Total: 31.50 km^{2} (12.16 sq mi)
- Elevation: 117 m (384 ft)

Population (2025)
  - Total: 1,118
- Time zone: UTC+1 (CET)
  - Summer (DST): UTC+2 (CEST)
- Postal code: 946 35
- Area code: +421 35
- Vehicle registration plate (until 2022): KN
- Website: www.obecbuc.sk

Búč (Hungarian: Búcs) is a village and municipality in the Komárno District in the Nitra Region of south-west Slovakia.

== Geography ==
The municipality lies at an altitude of 117 metres (384 ft) and covers an area of 31.50 km^{2} (12.16 sq mi) (2025).

== History ==
In the 9th century, the territory of Búč became part of the Kingdom of Hungary. In historical records the village was first mentioned in 1208. After the Austro-Hungarian army disintegrated in November 1918, Czechoslovak troops occupied the area, later acknowledged internationally by the Treaty of Trianon. Between 1938 and 1945 Búč once more became part of Miklós Horthy's Hungary through the First Vienna Award. From 1945 until the Velvet Divorce, it was part of Czechoslovakia. Since then it has been part of Slovakia.

== Population ==
Population statistic (10 years)
Year	1995	2005	2015	2025
Count	1328	1199	1143	1118
Difference		−9.71%	−4.67%	−2.18%

Population statistic
Year	2024	2025
Count	1118	1118
Difference		+0%

It has a population of 1118 people (31 December 2025).

=== Ethnicity ===
Census 2021 (1+ %)
Ethnicity	Number	Fraction
Hungarian	1019	88.76%
Slovak	128	11.14%
Not found out	36	3.13%
Total	1148	

In year 2021 was 1148 people by ethnicity 1019 as Hungarian, 128 as Slovak, 36 as Not found out, 5 as Romani, 2 as Czech, 2 as Austrian, 2 as Other, 1 as Jewish, 1 as Rusyn and 1 as Polish.

Note on population: The difference values of population numbers in the table "Population statistic" and in the sections "Ethnicity" & "Religion" is caused by the use of various statistical methods.

=== Religion ===
Census 2021 (1+ %)
Religion	Number	Fraction
Calvinist Church	598	52.09%
Roman Catholic Church	305	26.57%
None	185	16.11%
Not found out	28	2.44%
Evangelical Church	21	1.83%
Total	1148	

In year 2021 was 1148 people by religion 598 from Calvinist Church, 305 from Roman Catholic Church, 185 from None, 28 from Not found out, 21 from Evangelical Church, 7 from Greek Catholic Church, 1 from Christian Congregations in Slovakia, 1 from Other, 1 from Buddhism and 1 from Baptists Church.

== Facilities ==
The village has a public library, a gym and a football pitch.

== Genealogical resources ==
The records for genealogical research are available at the state archive "Statny Archiv in Nitra, Slovakia"

- Roman Catholic church records (births/marriages/deaths): 1741-1910 (parish B)
- Reformated church records (births/marriages/deaths): 1783-1923 (parish A)

== See also ==
- List of municipalities and towns in Slovakia
