= Brestovec, Komárno District =

Brestovec, Komárno District Szilas
- Municipality
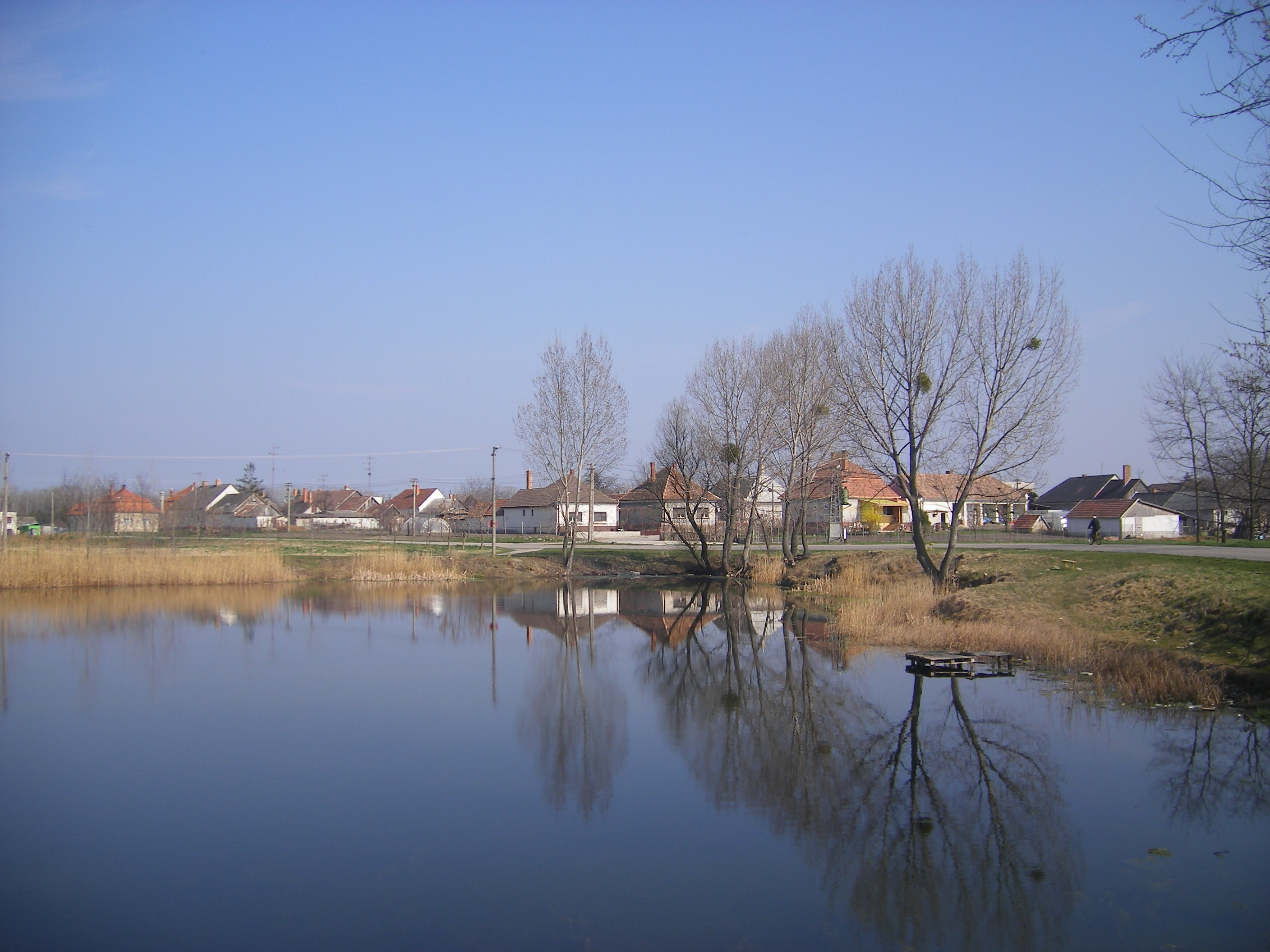
- Pond in the village

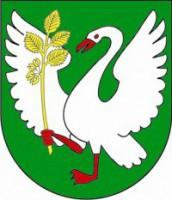
- Flag Coat of arms

- Location of Brestovec, Komárno District in the Nitra Region Location of Brestovec, Komárno District in Slovakia
- Coordinates: 47.86°N 17.82°E
- Country: Slovakia
- Region: Nitra Region
- District: Komárno District
- First mentioned: 1327

Government
  - Mayor: Peter Tóth (MOST-HÍD)

Area
  - Total: 7.49 km^{2} (2.89 sq mi)
- Elevation: 110 m (360 ft)

Population (2025)
  - Total: 508
- Time zone: UTC+1 (CET)
  - Summer (DST): UTC+2 (CEST)
- Postal code: 946 17
- Area code: +421 35
- Vehicle registration plate (until 2022): KN
- Website: www.brestovec.eu

Brestovec (na Ostrove) (Hungarian: Szilas) is a village and municipality in the Komárno District in the Nitra Region of southwest Slovakia.

== Geography ==
The municipality lies at an altitude of 110 metres (360 ft) and covers an area of 7.49 km^{2} (2.89 sq mi) (2025).

== History ==
In the 9th century, the territory of Brestovec became part of the Kingdom of Hungary. In historical records the village was first mentioned in 1327. After the Austro-Hungarian army disintegrated in November 1918, Czechoslovak troops occupied the area, later acknowledged internationally by the Treaty of Trianon. Between 1938 and 1945 Brestovec once more became part of Miklós Horthy's Hungary through the First Vienna Award. From 1945 until the Velvet Divorce, it was part of Czechoslovakia. Since then it has been part of Slovakia.

== Population ==
Population statistic (10 years)
Year	1995	2005	2015	2025
Count	494	482	493	508
Difference		−2.42%	+2.28%	+3.04%

Population statistic
Year	2024	2025
Count	503	508
Difference		+0.99%

It has a population of 508 people (31 December 2025).

=== Ethnicity ===
Census 2021 (1+ %)
Ethnicity	Number	Fraction
Hungarian	453	93.4%
Slovak	40	8.24%
Not found out	13	2.68%
Total	485	

In year 2021 was 485 people by ethnicity 453 as Hungarian, 40 as Slovak, 13 as Not found out, 3 as Czech, 1 as Ukrainian, 1 as Serbian and 1 as Rusyn.

Note on population: The difference values of population numbers in the table "Population statistic" and in the sections "Ethnicity" & "Religion" is caused by the use of various statistical methods.

=== Religion ===
Census 2021 (1+ %)
Religion	Number	Fraction
Roman Catholic Church	233	48.04%
None	144	29.69%
Calvinist Church	83	17.11%
Greek Catholic Church	10	2.06%
Not found out	5	1.03%
Total	485	

In year 2021 was 485 people by religion 233 from Roman Catholic Church, 144 from None, 83 from Calvinist Church, 10 from Greek Catholic Church, 5 from Not found out, 4 from Christian Congregations in Slovakia, 2 from Evangelical Church, 1 from Old Catholic Church, 1 from Eastern Orthodox Church, 1 from Jehovah's Witnesses and 1 from Other.

== Facilities ==
The village has a public library, and a football pitch.

== Genealogical resources ==
The records for genealogical research are available at the state archive "Statny Archiv in Bratislava, Nitra, Slovakia"

- Roman Catholic church records (births/marriages/deaths): 1750-1939 (parish B)
- Reformated church records (births/marriages/deaths): 1774-1943 (parish B)

== See also ==
- List of municipalities and towns in Slovakia
