= Tôň =

Tôň Tany
- Municipality
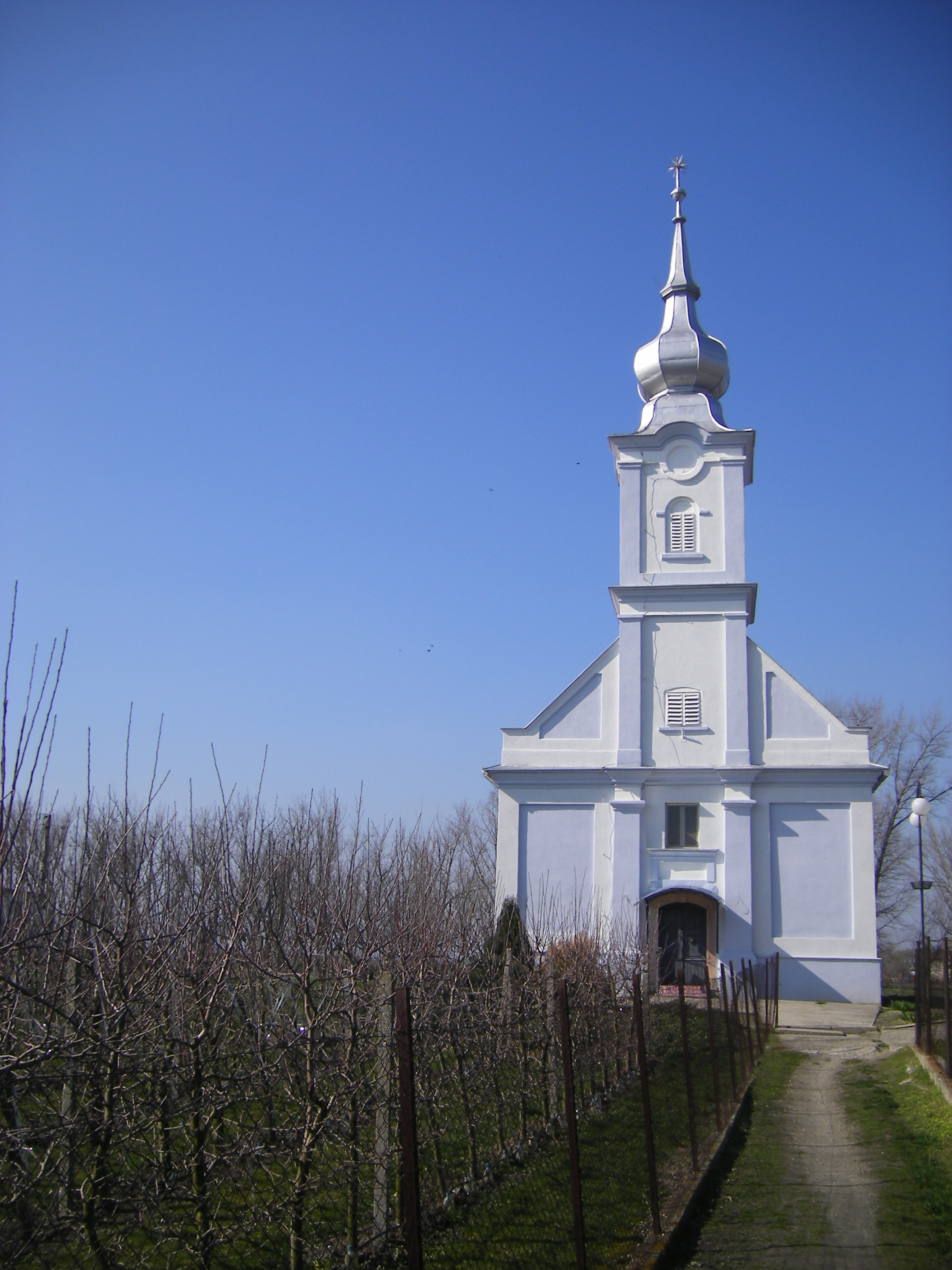
- Reformed church

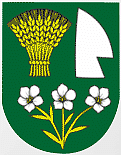
- Flag Coat of arms

- Location of Tôň in the Nitra Region Location of Tôň in Slovakia
- Coordinates: 47.80°N 17.83°E
- Country: Slovakia
- Region: Nitra Region
- District: Komárno District
- First mentioned: 1268

Government
  - Mayor: Imre Bugár

Area
  - Total: 9.49 km^{2} (3.66 sq mi)
- Elevation: 111 m (364 ft)

Population (2025)
  - Total: 701
- Time zone: UTC+1 (CET)
  - Summer (DST): UTC+2 (CEST)
- Postal code: 946 15
- Area code: +421 35
- Vehicle registration plate (until 2022): KN
- Website: www.bizref.sk/obecton

Tôň (pronunciation: [tuoɲ], Hungarian: Tany, Hungarian pronunciation:[ˈtɒɲ]) is a village and municipality in the Komárno District in the Nitra Region of south-west Slovakia.

== History ==
In the 9th century, the territory of Tôň became part of the Kingdom of Hungary. In historical records the village was first mentioned in 1268. After the Austro-Hungarian army disintegrated in November 1918, Czechoslovak troops occupied the area, later acknowledged internationally by the Treaty of Trianon. Between 1938 and 1945 Tôň once more became part of Miklós Horthy's Hungary through the First Vienna Award. From 1945 until the Velvet Divorce, it was part of Czechoslovakia. Since then it has been part of Slovakia.

== Geography ==
The municipality lies at an altitude of 111 metres (364 ft) and covers an area of 9.49 km^{2} (3.66 sq mi) (2025).

== Population ==
Population statistic (10 years)
Year	1995	2005	2015	2025
Count	829	833	780	701
Difference		+0.48%	−6.36%	−10.12%

Population statistic
Year	2024	2025
Count	718	701
Difference		−2.36%

It has a population of 701 people (31 December 2025).

=== Ethnicity ===
Census 2021 (1+ %)
Ethnicity	Number	Fraction
Hungarian	620	84.12%
Slovak	126	17.09%
Not found out	41	5.56%
Total	737	

In year 2021 was 737 people by ethnicity 620 as Hungarian, 126 as Slovak, 41 as Not found out, 5 as Czech, 3 as Moravian, 2 as Other, 1 as Romani and 1 as Austrian.

Note on population: The difference values of population numbers in the table "Population statistic" and in the sections "Ethnicity" & "Religion" is caused by the use of various statistical methods.

=== Religion ===
Census 2021 (1+ %)
Religion	Number	Fraction
None	324	43.96%
Roman Catholic Church	185	25.1%
Calvinist Church	176	23.88%
Not found out	28	3.8%
Evangelical Church	8	1.09%
Total	737	

In year 2021 was 737 people by religion 324 from None, 185 from Roman Catholic Church, 176 from Calvinist Church, 28 from Not found out, 8 from Evangelical Church, 5 from Other and not ascertained christian church, 5 from Greek Catholic Church, 2 from Other, 1 from Old Catholic Church, 1 from Jehovah's Witnesses, 1 from Islam and 1 from Church of Jesus Christ of Latter-day Saints.

== Facilities ==
The village has a public library a gym and a football pitch.
