= Dulovce =

Dulovce Újgyalla
- Municipality
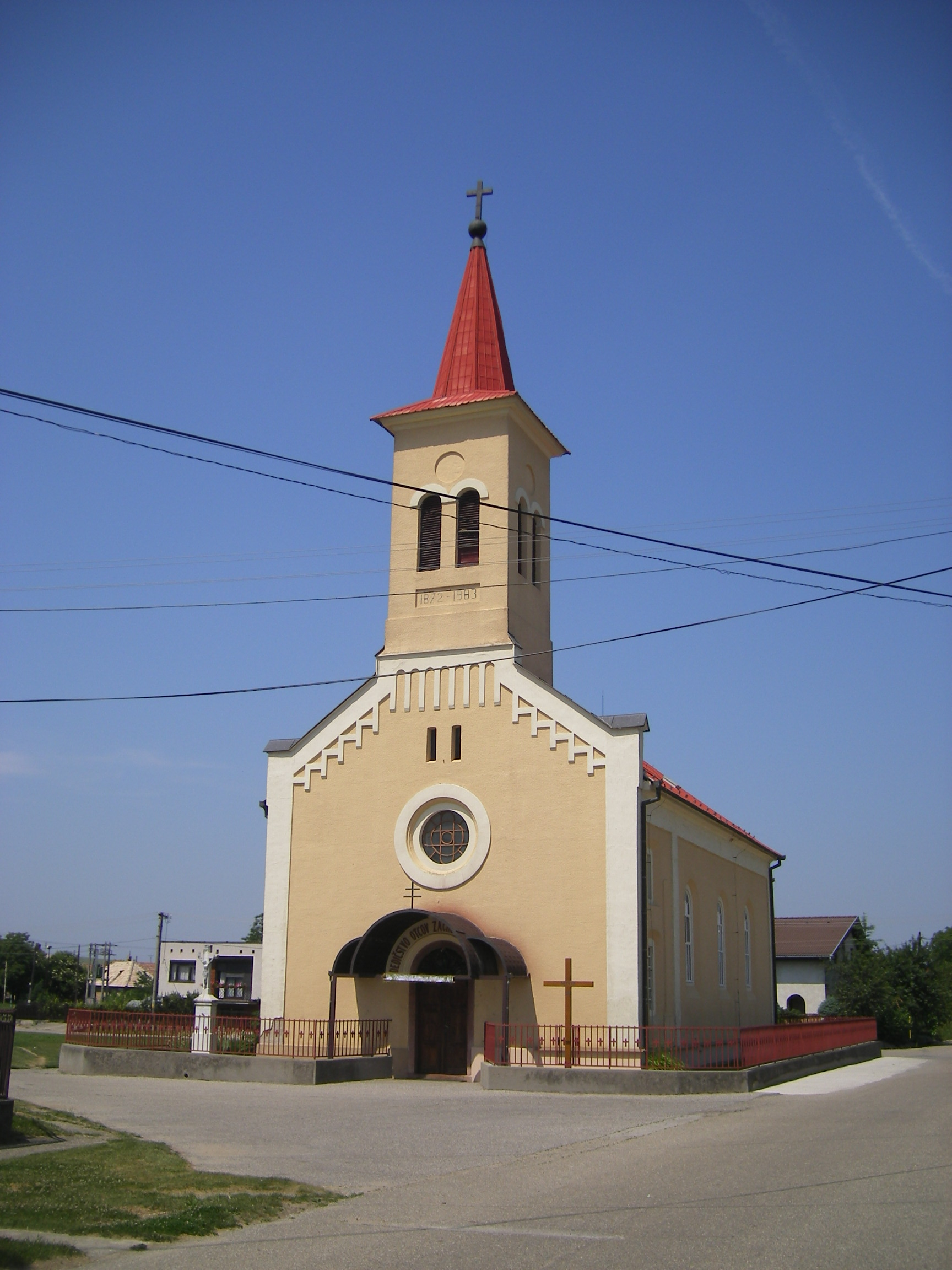
- Roman Catholic church of Saint Lukas

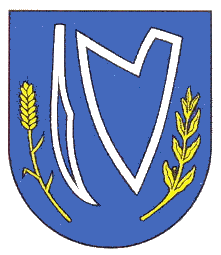
- Flag Coat of arms

- Location of Dulovce in the Nitra Region Location of Dulovce in Slovakia
- Coordinates: 47.87°N 18.27°E
- Country: Slovakia
- Region: Nitra Region
- District: Komárno District
- First mentioned: 1356

Area
  - Total: 12.38 km^{2} (4.78 sq mi)
- Elevation: 136 m (446 ft)

Population (2025)
  - Total: 1,575
- Time zone: UTC+1 (CET)
  - Summer (DST): UTC+2 (CEST)
- Postal code: 946 56
- Area code: +421 35
- Vehicle registration plate (until 2022): KN
- Website: www.dulovce.sk

Dulovce, until 1948 Nová Ďala (Hungarian: Újgyalla) is a village and municipality in the Komárno District in the Nitra Region of south-west Slovakia.

== Geography ==
The municipality lies at an altitude of 136 metres (446 ft) and covers an area of 12.38 km^{2} (4.78 sq mi) (2025).

== History ==
In historical records the village was first mentioned in 1356. After the Austro-Hungarian army disintegrated in November 1918, Czechoslovak troops occupied the area, later acknowledged internationally by the Treaty of Trianon. Between 1938 and 1945 Dulovce once more became part of Miklós Horthy's Hungary through the First Vienna Award. From 1945 until the Velvet Divorce, it was part of Czechoslovakia. Since then it has been part of Slovakia.

== Population ==
Population statistic (10 years)
Year	1995	2005	2015	2025
Count	1884	1844	1755	1575
Difference		−2.12%	−4.82%	−10.25%

Population statistic
Year	2024	2025
Count	1598	1575
Difference		−1.43%

It has a population of 1575 people (31 December 2025).

=== Ethnicity ===
Census 2021 (1+ %)
Ethnicity	Number	Fraction
Slovak	1538	93.32%
Hungarian	72	4.36%
Not found out	50	3.03%
Total	1648	

In year 2021 was 1648 people by ethnicity 1538 as Slovak, 72 as Hungarian, 50 as Not found out, 15 as Romani, 11 as Czech, 4 as Croatian, 3 as Russian, 3 as Other, 1 as Rusyn, 1 as Polish and 1 as German.

Note on population: The difference values of population numbers in the table "Population statistic" and in the sections "Ethnicity" & "Religion" is caused by the use of various statistical methods.

=== Religion ===
Census 2021 (1+ %)
Religion	Number	Fraction
Roman Catholic Church	1230	74.64%
None	303	18.39%
Not found out	47	2.85%
Evangelical Church	20	1.21%
Total	1648	

In year 2021 was 1648 people by religion 1230 from Roman Catholic Church, 303 from None, 47 from Not found out, 20 from Evangelical Church, 12 from Greek Catholic Church, 10 from Calvinist Church, 9 from Christian Congregations in Slovakia, 6 from Other, 4 from Ad hoc movements, 2 from Paganism and natural spirituality, 2 from Jehovah's Witnesses, 1 from Eastern Orthodox Church, 1 from Buddhism and 1 from Baptists Church.

== Facilities ==
The village has a public library, a gym and a football pitch.

== See also ==
- List of municipalities and towns in Slovakia

== Genealogical resources ==
The records for genealogical research are available at the state archive "Statny Archiv in Nitra, Slovakia"

- Roman Catholic church records (births/marriages/deaths): 1764-1895 (parish B)
