= Komárno District =

Coordinates: 47°45′45″N 18°7′52″E

- District
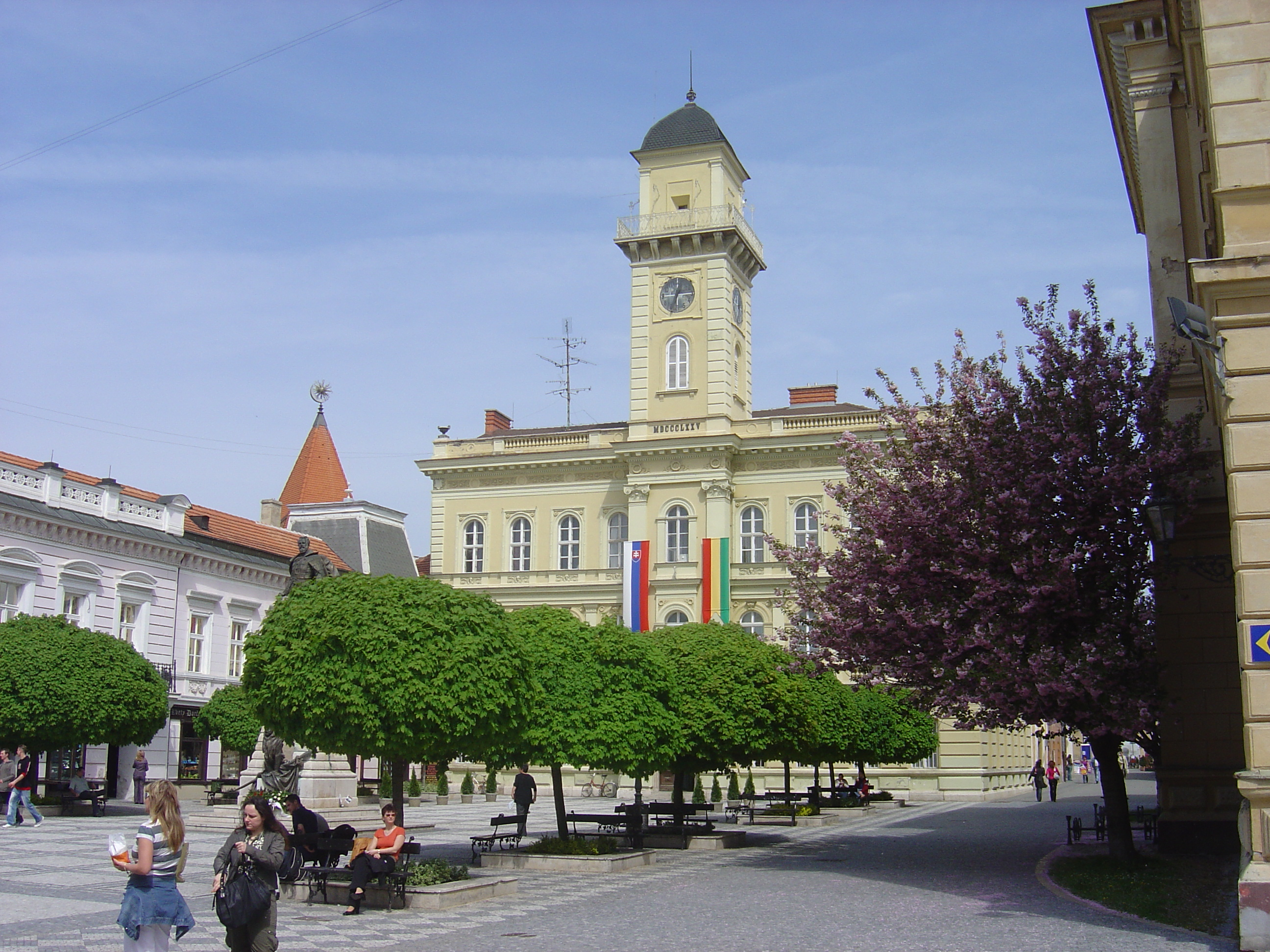
- Country: Slovakia
- Region: Nitra Region
- Seat: Komárno

Area
  - Total: 1,100.14 km^{2} (424.77 sq mi)

Population (2025)
  - Total: 98,217
- Time zone: UTC+1 (CET)
  - Summer (DST): UTC+2 (CEST)
- Telephone prefix: 035
- Vehicle registration plate (until 2022): KN
- Municipalities: 41

Komárno District (Slovak: okres Komárno, Hungarian: Komáromi járás) is a district in the Nitra Region of western Slovakia. Until 1918, the district was mostly part of the Komárom county within the Kingdom of Hungary.

The district has a population of 108.556 of which 74.976 (69.1%) are Hungarians and 30.079 (27.7%) are Slovaks (2001).

== Population ==
Population statistic (10 years)
Year	1995	2005	2015	2025
Count	109,027	107,037	102,961	98,217
Difference		−1.82%	−3.80%	−4.60%

Population statistic
Year	2024	2025
Count	98,829	98,217
Difference		−0.61%

It has a population of 98,217 people (31 December 2025).

Historical population
Year	Pop.	±%
1970	106,698	—
1980	110,369	+3.4%
1991	109,279	−1.0%
2001	108,556	−0.7%
2011	103,995	−4.2%
2021	100,952	−2.9%
Source: Statistical Office of the Slovak Republic

=== Ethnicity ===
Census 2021 (1+ %)
Ethnicity	Number	Fraction
Hungarian	65,168	60.16%
Slovak	31,148	28.75%
Not found out	9165	8.46%
Romani	1340	1.23%
Total	108,312	

In year 2021 was 108,312 people by ethnicity 65,168 as Hungarian, 31,148 as Slovak, 9165 as Not found out, 1340 as Romani, 567 as Czech, 213 as Other, 99 as Vietnamese, 84 as Ukrainian, 82 as Russian, 81 as German, 54 as Polish, 36 as Italian, 35 as Rusyn, 28 as Jewish, 28 as Croatian, 27 as Romanian, 27 as Bulgarian, 21 as Moravian, 19 as Serbian, 18 as Turkish, 15 as Austrian, 9 as English, 8 as Canadian, 8 as Albanian, 7 as Korean, 7 as Greek, 6 as Chinese, 6 as Irish, 4 as French and 2 as Silesian.

Note on population: The difference values of population numbers in the table "Population statistic" and in the sections "Ethnicity" & "Religion" is caused by the use of various statistical methods.

=== Religion ===
Census 2021 (1+ %)
Religion	Number	Fraction
Roman Catholic Church	45,203	44.78%
None	28,779	28.51%
Calvinist Church	13,241	13.12%
Not found out	8298	8.22%
Evangelical Church	2437	2.41%
Total	100,952	

In year 2021 was 100,952 people by religion 45,203 from Roman Catholic Church, 28,779 from None, 13,241 from Calvinist Church, 8298 from Not found out, 2437 from Evangelical Church, 804 from Greek Catholic Church, 452 from Baptists Church, 377 from Jehovah's Witnesses, 309 from Christian Congregations in Slovakia, 190 from Other and not ascertained christian church, 156 from Other, 126 from Eastern Orthodox Church, 111 from Apostolic Church, 93 from Old Catholic Church, 87 from Buddhism, 78 from Ad hoc movements, 66 from Islam, 55 from United Methodist Church, 28 from Jewish community, 27 from Paganism and natural spirituality, 13 from Hinduism, 8 from Czechoslovak Hussite Church, 5 from Seventh-day Adventist Church, 4 from Church of Jesus Christ of Latter-day Saints, 3 from Church of the Brethren and 2 from Bahá'i Community.

== Municipalities ==
Municipality	Area [km^{2}]	Population
Bajč	36.47	1,276
Bátorove Kosihy	45.88	3,296
Bodza	6.31	385
Bodzianske Lúky	5.16	174
Brestovec	7.49	508
Búč	31.50	1,118
Čalovec	23.20	1,100
Číčov	29.50	1,188
Dedina Mládeže	12.78	403
Dulovce	12.38	1,575
Holiare	9.88	454
Hurbanovo	59.94	7,111
Chotín	20.42	1,390
Imeľ	21.95	1,975
Iža	28.07	1,798
Kameničná	34.55	1,892
Klížska Nemá	11.80	422
Kolárovo	106.82	10,381
Komárno	102.80	31,560
Kravany nad Dunajom	15.90	704
Lipové	10.57	161
Marcelová	35.74	3,790
Martovce	19.96	682
Moča	17.99	1,135
Modrany	27.06	1,279
Mudroňovo	4.00	118
Nesvady	57.86	4,970
Okoličná na Ostrove	29.88	1,434
Patince	11.30	540
Pribeta	42.79	2,590
Radvaň nad Dunajom	15.75	702
Sokolce	19.42	1,189
Svätý Peter	34.32	2,693
Šrobárová	8.38	486
Tôň	9.49	701
Trávnik	18.73	639
Veľké Kosihy	24.43	937
Virt	4.69	324
Vrbová nad Váhom	21.69	536
Zemianska Olča	27.94	2,226
Zlatná na Ostrove	35.40	2,375

Population and area values are current for year 2025.

== See also ==
- Dunajská Streda District
