= Zemianska Olča =

Zemianska Olča Nemesócsa
- Municipality
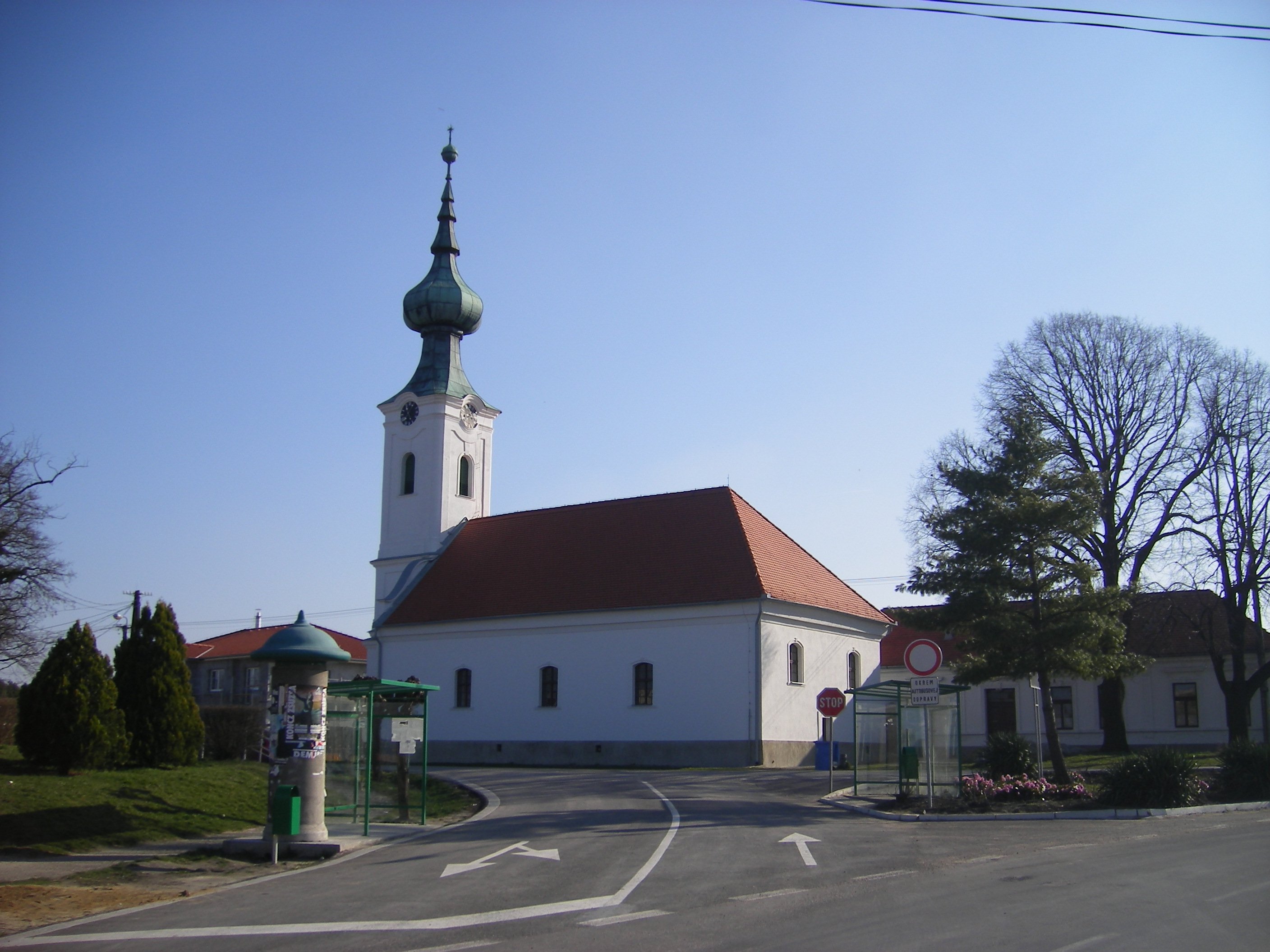
- Reformed church

- Coat of arms

- Location of Zemianska Olča in the Nitra Region Location of Zemianska Olča in Slovakia
- Coordinates: 47.80°N 17.87°E
- Country: Slovakia
- Region: Nitra Region
- District: Komárno District
- First mentioned: 1247

Area
  - Total: 27.94 km^{2} (10.79 sq mi)
- Elevation: 111 m (364 ft)

Population (2025)
  - Total: 2,226
- Time zone: UTC+1 (CET)
  - Summer (DST): UTC+2 (CEST)
- Postal code: 946 14
- Area code: +421 35
- Vehicle registration plate (until 2022): KN
- Website: www.zemianskaolca.sk

Zemianska Olča (Hungarian: Nemesócsa, pronounced [ˈnɛmɛʃoːtʃɒ]) is a village and municipality in the Komárno District in the Nitra Region of south-west Slovakia.

== Geography ==
The municipality lies at an altitude of 111 metres (364 ft) and covers an area of 27.94 km^{2} (10.79 sq mi) (2025).

== History ==
In the 9th century, the territory of Zemianska Olča became part of the Kingdom of Hungary. In historical records the village was first mentioned in 1247. After the Austro-Hungarian army disintegrated in November 1918, Czechoslovak troops occupied the area, later acknowledged internationally by the Treaty of Trianon. Between 1938 and 1945 Zemianska Olča once more became part of Miklós Horthy's Hungary through the First Vienna Award. From 1945 until the Velvet Divorce, it was part of Czechoslovakia. Since then it has been part of Slovakia.

== Population ==
Population statistic (10 years)
Year	1995	2005	2015	2025
Count	2622	2620	2347	2226
Difference		−0.07%	−10.41%	−5.15%

Population statistic
Year	2024	2025
Count	2248	2226
Difference		−0.97%

It has a population of 2226 people (31 December 2025).

=== Ethnicity ===
Census 2021 (1+ %)
Ethnicity	Number	Fraction
Hungarian	1898	81.91%
Slovak	297	12.81%
Not found out	215	9.27%
Total	2317	

In year 2021 was 2317 people by ethnicity 1898 as Hungarian, 297 as Slovak, 215 as Not found out, 11 as Czech, 6 as Romani, 4 as German, 3 as Other, 2 as Serbian, 2 as Austrian, 1 as Rusyn, 1 as Russian, 1 as Romanian and 1 as English.

Note on population: The difference values of population numbers in the table "Population statistic" and in the sections "Ethnicity" & "Religion" is caused by the use of various statistical methods.

=== Religion ===
Census 2021 (1+ %)
Religion	Number	Fraction
None	764	32.97%
Calvinist Church	721	31.12%
Roman Catholic Church	546	23.56%
Not found out	181	7.81%
Evangelical Church	61	2.63%
Total	2317	

In year 2021 was 2317 people by religion 764 from None, 721 from Calvinist Church, 546 from Roman Catholic Church, 181 from Not found out, 61 from Evangelical Church, 19 from Greek Catholic Church, 7 from Old Catholic Church, 7 from Jehovah's Witnesses, 4 from Other and not ascertained christian church, 2 from Other, 2 from United Methodist Church, 1 from Eastern Orthodox Church, 1 from Christian Congregations in Slovakia and 1 from Buddhism.

The village is about 90% Hungarian, and 9% Slovak.

== Facilities ==
The village has a public library, a gym and a football pitch.
