= Čalovec =

Čalovec Megyercs
- Municipality
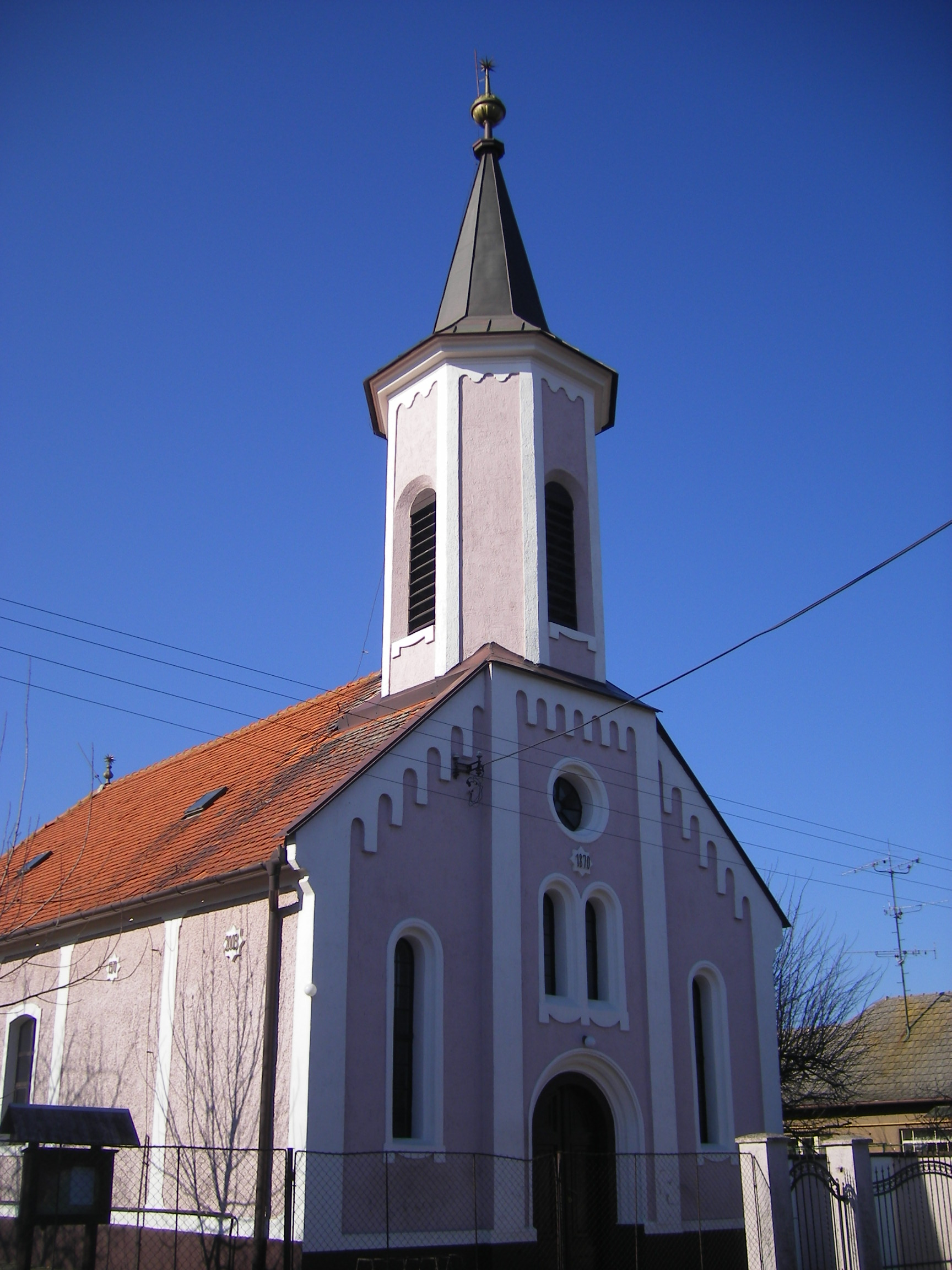
- Reformed church

- Flag Coat of arms

- Location of Čalovec in the Nitra Region Location of Čalovec in Slovakia
- Coordinates: 47.80°N 17.98°E
- Country: Slovakia
- Region: Nitra Region
- District: Komárno District
- First mentioned: 1268

Area
  - Total: 23.20 km^{2} (8.96 sq mi)
- Elevation: 108 m (354 ft)

Population (2025)
  - Total: 1,100
- Time zone: UTC+1 (CET)
  - Summer (DST): UTC+2 (CEST)
- Postal code: 946 02
- Area code: +421 35
- Vehicle registration plate (until 2022): KN
- Website: www.calovec.sk

Čalovec, formerly Mederč (Hungarian: Megyercs, Hungarian pronunciation:[ˈmɛɟɛrtʃ]) is a village and municipality in the Komárno District in the Nitra Region of south-west Slovakia.

== Geography ==
The municipality lies at an altitude of 108 metres (354 ft) and covers an area of 23.20 km^{2} (8.96 sq mi) (2025).

== History ==
In the 9th century, the territory of Čalovec became part of the Kingdom of Hungary. The village was first mentioned in 1268 After the Austro-Hungarian army disintegrated in November 1918, Czechoslovak troops occupied the area, later acknowledged internationally by the Treaty of Trianon. Between 1938 and 1945 Čalovec once more became part of Miklós Horthy's Hungary through the First Vienna Award. From 1945 until the Velvet Divorce, it was part of Czechoslovakia. Since then it has been part of Slovakia.

== Population ==
Population statistic (10 years)
Year	1995	2005	2015	2025
Count	1164	1184	1171	1100
Difference		+1.71%	−1.09%	−6.06%

Population statistic
Year	2024	2025
Count	1109	1100
Difference		−0.81%

It has a population of 1100 people (31 December 2025).

=== Ethnicity ===
Census 2021 (1+ %)
Ethnicity	Number	Fraction
Hungarian	780	70.01%
Slovak	308	27.64%
Not found out	77	6.91%
Total	1114	

In year 2021 was 1114 people by ethnicity 780 as Hungarian, 308 as Slovak, 77 as Not found out, 10 as Czech, 4 as Romani, 3 as Jewish, 2 as Other and 1 as German.

Note on population: The difference values of population numbers in the table "Population statistic" and in the sections "Ethnicity" & "Religion" is caused by the use of various statistical methods.

=== Religion ===
Census 2021 (1+ %)
Religion	Number	Fraction
None	494	44.34%
Roman Catholic Church	249	22.35%
Calvinist Church	239	21.45%
Not found out	71	6.37%
Evangelical Church	24	2.15%
Greek Catholic Church	17	1.53%
Total	1114	

In year 2021 was 1114 people by religion 494 from None, 249 from Roman Catholic Church, 239 from Calvinist Church, 71 from Not found out, 24 from Evangelical Church, 17 from Greek Catholic Church, 6 from Jehovah's Witnesses, 3 from Other and not ascertained christian church, 3 from United Methodist Church, 2 from Jewish community, 2 from Old Catholic Church, 2 from Christian Congregations in Slovakia, 1 from Paganism and natural spirituality and 1 from Ad hoc movements.

== Facilities ==
The village has a public library and a football pitch.

== Genealogical resources ==
The records for genealogical research are available at the state archive "Statny Archiv in Nitra, Slovakia"

- Reformated church records (births/marriages/deaths): 1828-1900 (parish A)

== See also ==
- List of municipalities and towns in Slovakia
