= Komárom District =

Coordinates: 47.7333°N 18.1167°E

Komárom District Komáromi járás
- Districts of Hungary
- Coat of arms

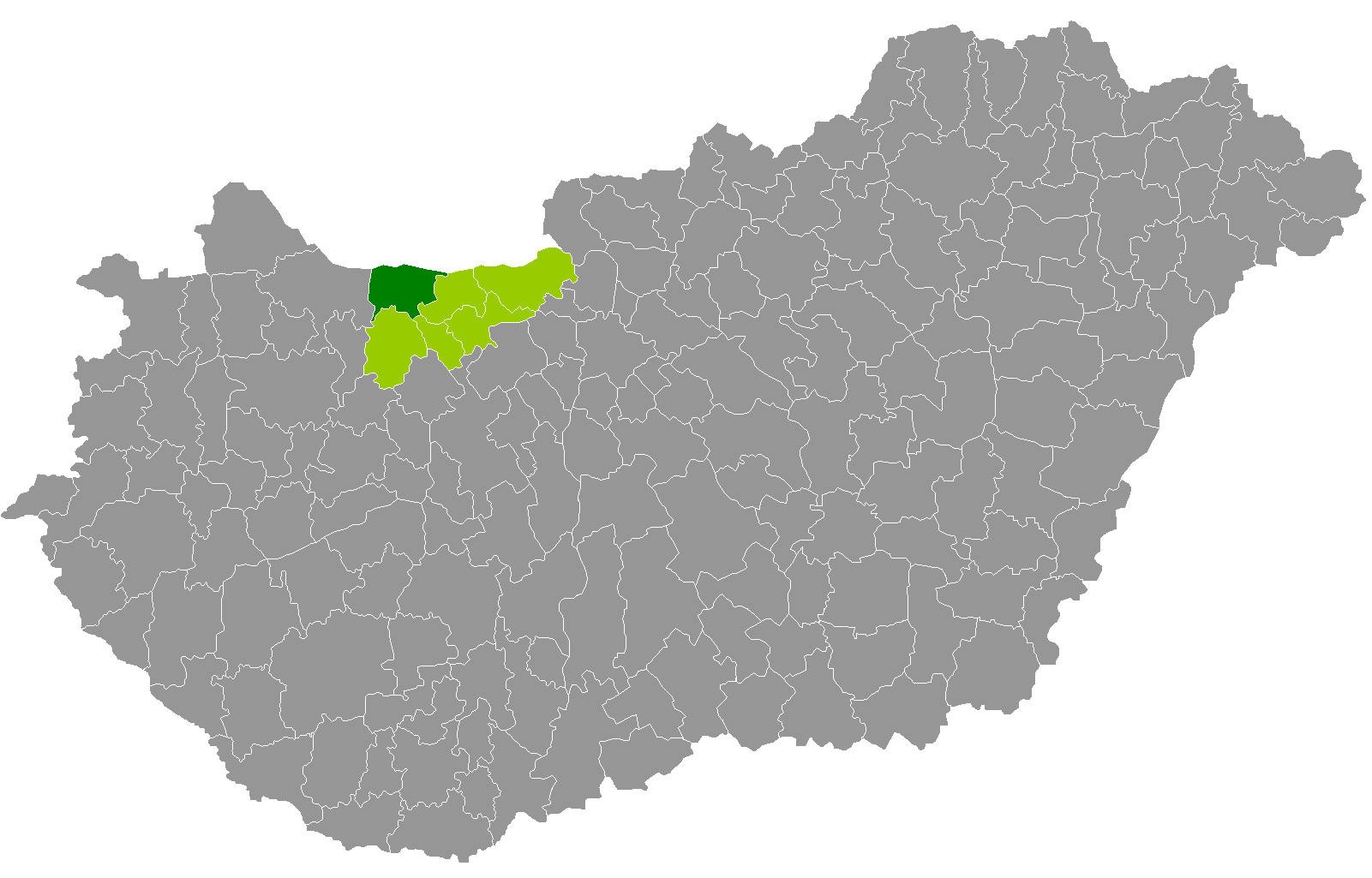
- Komárom District within Hungary and Komárom-Esztergom County.
- Country: Hungary
- County: Komárom-Esztergom
- District seat: Komárom

Area
  - Total: 378.78 km^{2} (146.25 sq mi)
  - Rank: 3rd in Komárom-Esztergom

Population (2011 census)
  - Total: 39,863
  - Rank: 3rd in Komárom-Esztergom
  - Density: 105/km^{2} (270/sq mi)
- Website: Official website

Komárom (Hungarian: Komáromi járás) is a district in north-western part of Komárom-Esztergom County. Komárom is also the name of the town where the district seat is found. The district is located in the Central Transdanubia Statistical Region.

== Geography ==
Komárom District borders with the Slovak Nitra Region to the north, Tata District to the east, Oroszlány District and Kisbér District to the south, Győr District (Győr-Moson-Sopron County) to the west. The number of the inhabited places in Komárom District is nine.

== Municipalities ==
The district has three towns, one large village and five villages (ordered alphabetically, as of 1 January 2013):

- **Ács** (6,808)
- Almásfüzitő (2,089)
- **Bábolna** (3,774)
- Bana (1,630)
- Csém (416)
- Kisigmánd (475)
- **Komárom** (19,200) – district seat
- Mocsa (2,142)
- Nagyigmánd (3,025)

The bolded municipalities are cities and towns, italics municipality is a large village.

== Demographics ==
Religion in Komárom District (2011 census)
1. Catholic Church (33.8%)
2. Greek Catholicism (0.40%)
3. Calvinism (17.6%)
4. Lutheranism (1.10%)
5. Other religions (1.10%)
6. Non-religious (16.3%)
7. Atheists (1.10%)
8. Undeclared (28.6%)

In 2011, it had a population of 39,863 and the population density was 105/km^{2}.

Year	County population	Change
2011	39,863	n/a

=== Ethnicity ===
Besides the Hungarian majority, the main minorities are the Roma (approx. 350), German (250) and Slovak (150).

Total population (2011 census): 39,863
Ethnic groups (2011 census):

- Hungarians: 34,121 (96.72%)
- Gypsies: 352 (1.00%)
- Others and indefinable: 806 (2.28%)
- Did not declare their ethnic group: approx. 4,500 persons

=== Religion ===
Religious adherence in the county according to 2011 census:

- Catholic – 13,637 (Roman Catholic – 13,489; Greek Catholic – 141);
- Reformed – 7,013;
- Evangelical – 427;
- other religions – 427;
- Non-religious – 6,496;
- Atheism – 441;
- Undeclared – 11,422.

== See also ==
- List of cities and towns in Hungary
