= Concó =

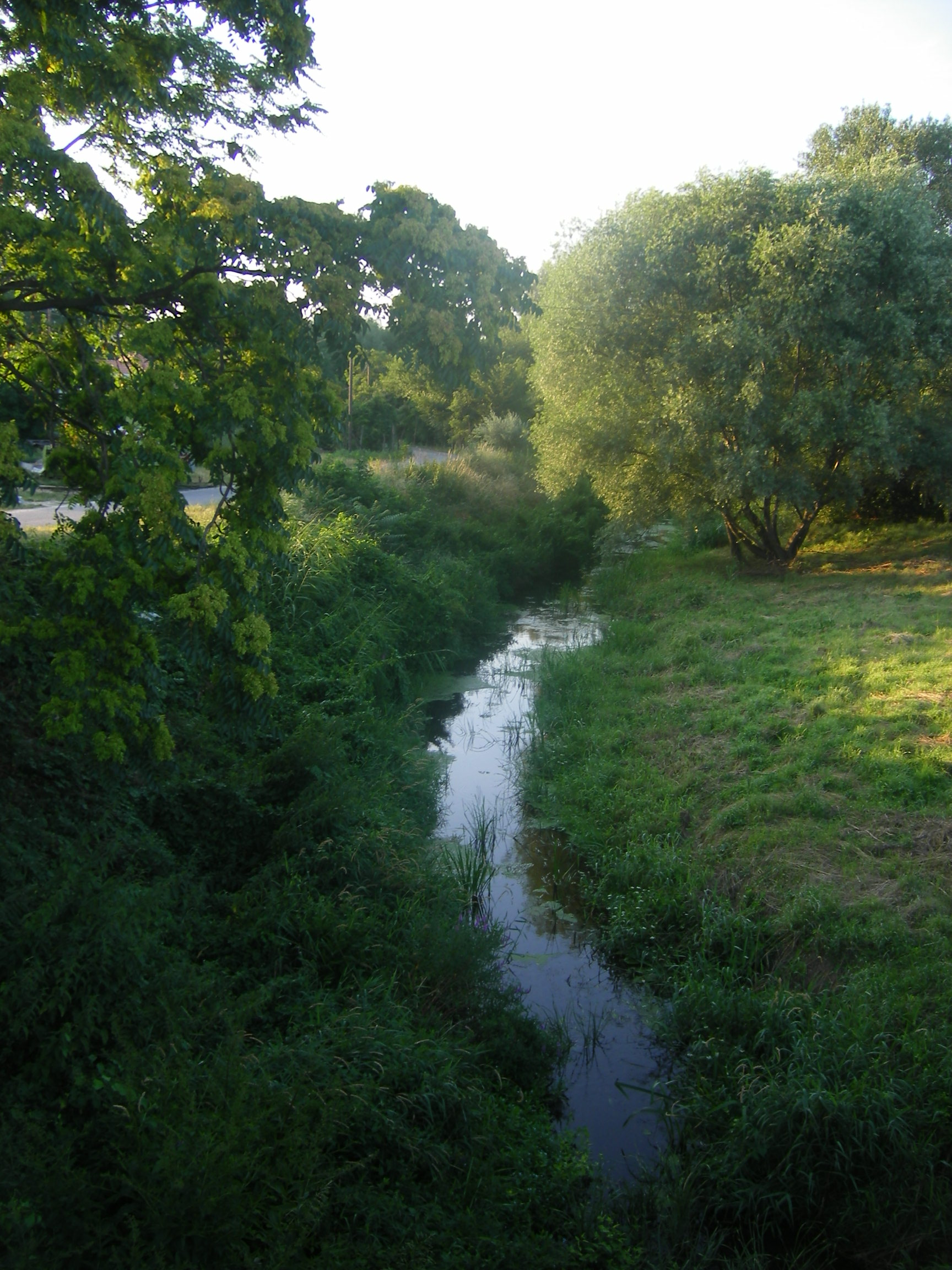

Location
- Country: Hungary
- Counties: Fejér and Komárom-Esztergom
- Towns & villages: Ácsteszér; Hánta (Kisbér District); Kisbér; Ászár; Tárkány; Nagyigmánd; Ács

Physical characteristics
- Source: Bakony range, Vértes Hills
- Mouth: Confluence with the Danube
  - coordinates: 47°44′37″N 18°00′01″E
- Length: 49 km (30 mi)
- Basin size: 498 km^{2} (192 sq mi)
- Discharge
  - location: Ács, Komárom-Esztergom County
  - average: 20.6 m^{3}/s (730 cu ft/s)

Basin features
- Progression: Danube→ Black Sea
- Tributaries
  - left: Csépi-ér, Vékony-ér
  - right: Saliházi-árok, Kisbéri-ér, Battyáni-ér, Tóér at Nagyigmánd, Haj-patak at Kisiginánd

Concó is a river in northern Hungary, a tributary of the Danube. It rises in Fejér County and enters the Danube in Komárom-Esztergom County near the city of Komárom.

== Geography ==
The Concó rises on the northern slopes of the Bakony range of the Transdanubian Mountains and the western and northwestern slopes of the Vértes Hills. It flows basically north and slightly west. In the mountains there are warm springs due to tectonic uplift. In the lower reaches the Concó is subject to flooding. As of 2009, sewage, wastewater and drainage from community landfills went essentially untreated into the river.

Mostly the area of the Concó Basin is wilderness in the south and farmlands in the middle and northern sections. The only significant industrial activity is in Kisbér, in the middle section. The Concó discharges into the Danube at the village of Ács.

The bedrock consists of Triassic limestones and sandstones, overlain by a thick layer of more recent alluvial sediments, predominantly sand and clay.

== History ==
The Romans had a military camp along the Concó near Ács.

The Battle of Bolia in 469 between various Germanic tribes may have been fought on the banks of the Concó.
