= Macso =

Macso may refer to:

- Macsó, the Hungarian name for the region of Mačva
  - Banate of Macsó, an administrative region in medieval Hungary
- Mácsó, the Hungarian name for the village of Bretea Română

== See also ==
- Masco
- Mocsa
