= Hanta =

Hanta may refer to:

- Viruses:
  - Hantavirus
  - Hantaan River virus
- Hantā Hantā, Hepburn reading of Hunter × Hunter, an anime and manga franchise
- Hánta, village of Kisbér District, Hungary
- Hanţa, village of Podu Turcului commune in Romania
