= Ács =

- Town
- Flag Coat of arms

- Location of Ács
- Coordinates: 47.71°N 18.016°E
- Country: Hungary
- County: Komárom-Esztergom
- District: Komárom

Area
  - Total: 103.83 km^{2} (40.09 sq mi)
- Elevation: 122 m (400 ft)

Population (2025)
  - Total: 6,920
  - Density: 65.42/km^{2} (169.4/sq mi)
- Time zone: UTC+1 (CET)
  - Summer (DST): UTC+2 (CEST)
- Postal code: 2941
- Area code: (+36) 34
- Motorways: M1
- Distance from Budapest: 98.2 km (61.0 mi) Southeast
- Website: www.acs-varos.hu

Ács (German: Atsch) is a town in Komárom-Esztergom county, northern Hungary.

== Geography ==
Ács is located in Komárom District on the eastern side of the Little Hungarian Plain near where the Concó River enters the Danube. It is below the Bársonyosi Hills, at the point where the Székes joins the Concó, three kilometer south of the Danube and eight kilometers southwest of the city of Komárno.

== Name ==
The name literally means "carpenter". It refers to the carpenters who lived here in service to the king. The place name is attested as As in 1260 and 1270 and as Alch in 1297.

== History ==
Ács was a settlement in Roman times, in the province of Pannonia. There were two Roman castra, Ad Mures and Ad Statuas, in the area.

An early mention in the 13th century called the place Iwan de As; and a document in 1346 called it Alchy.

In 1970 it was declared a large commune (Nagyközség); and on 1 July 2007 it received town status.

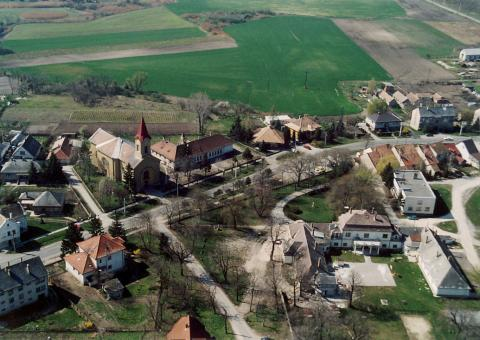
Aerial Photography of Ács

== Twin towns – sister cities ==
Ács is twinned with:

- Zlatná na Ostrove, Slovakia
- Brăduț, Romania
- Steinau, Germany
