= Császár =

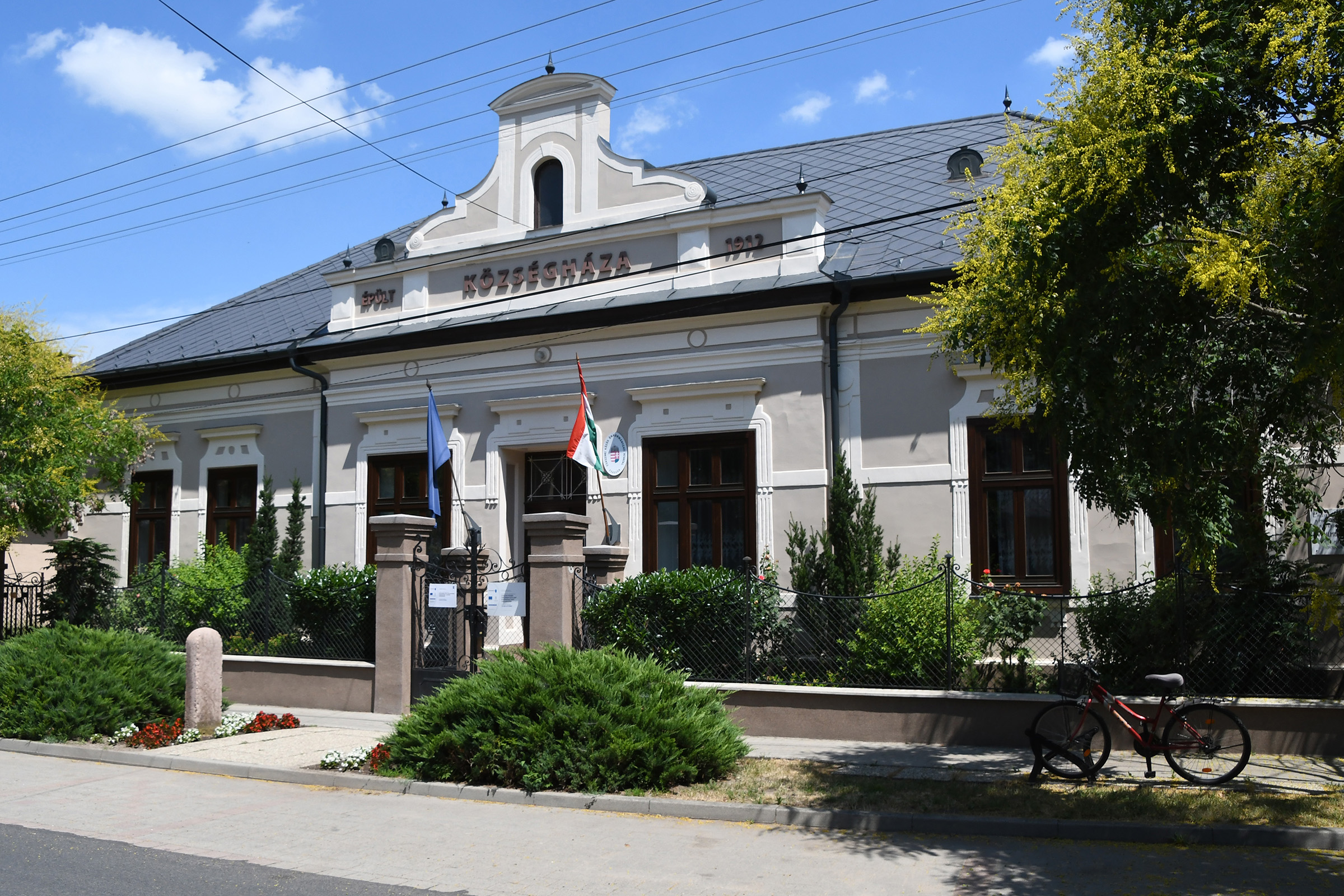
- Village hall

- Location of Komárom-Esztergom county in Hungary

- Location of Császár
- Coordinates: 47.50203°N 18.14206°E
- Country: Hungary
- County: Komárom-Esztergom

Area
  - Total: 67.82 km^{2} (26.19 sq mi)

Population (2004)
  - Total: 1,892
  - Density: 27.89/km^{2} (72.2/sq mi)
- Time zone: UTC+1 (CET)
  - Summer (DST): UTC+2 (CEST)
- Postal code: 2858
- Area code: 34

Császár is a village in Komárom-Esztergom county, Hungaryin the Kisbéri district.
