= Bábolna =

- Town
- Flag Coat of arms

- Location of Komárom-Esztergom county in Hungary

- Location of Bábolna
- Coordinates: 47.64282°N 17.97864°E
- Country: Hungary
- Region: Central Transdanubia
- County: Komárom-Esztergom
- District: Komárom

Area
  - Total: 33.59 km^{2} (12.97 sq mi)

Population (2015)
  - Total: 3,789
  - Density: 112.8/km^{2} (292.2/sq mi)
- Time zone: UTC+1 (CET)
  - Summer (DST): UTC+2 (CEST)
- Postal code: 2943
- Area code: (+36) 34
- Motorways: M1
- Distance from Budapest: 98.8 km (61.4 mi) East
- Website: www.babolna.hu

Bábolna is a town in Komárom-Esztergom county, Hungary.

Bábolna houses a riding school, Pettko-Szandtner Tibor Lovas Szakiskola es Kollegium and a stud farm.
