= Kameničná =

Kameničná Keszegfalva
- Municipality
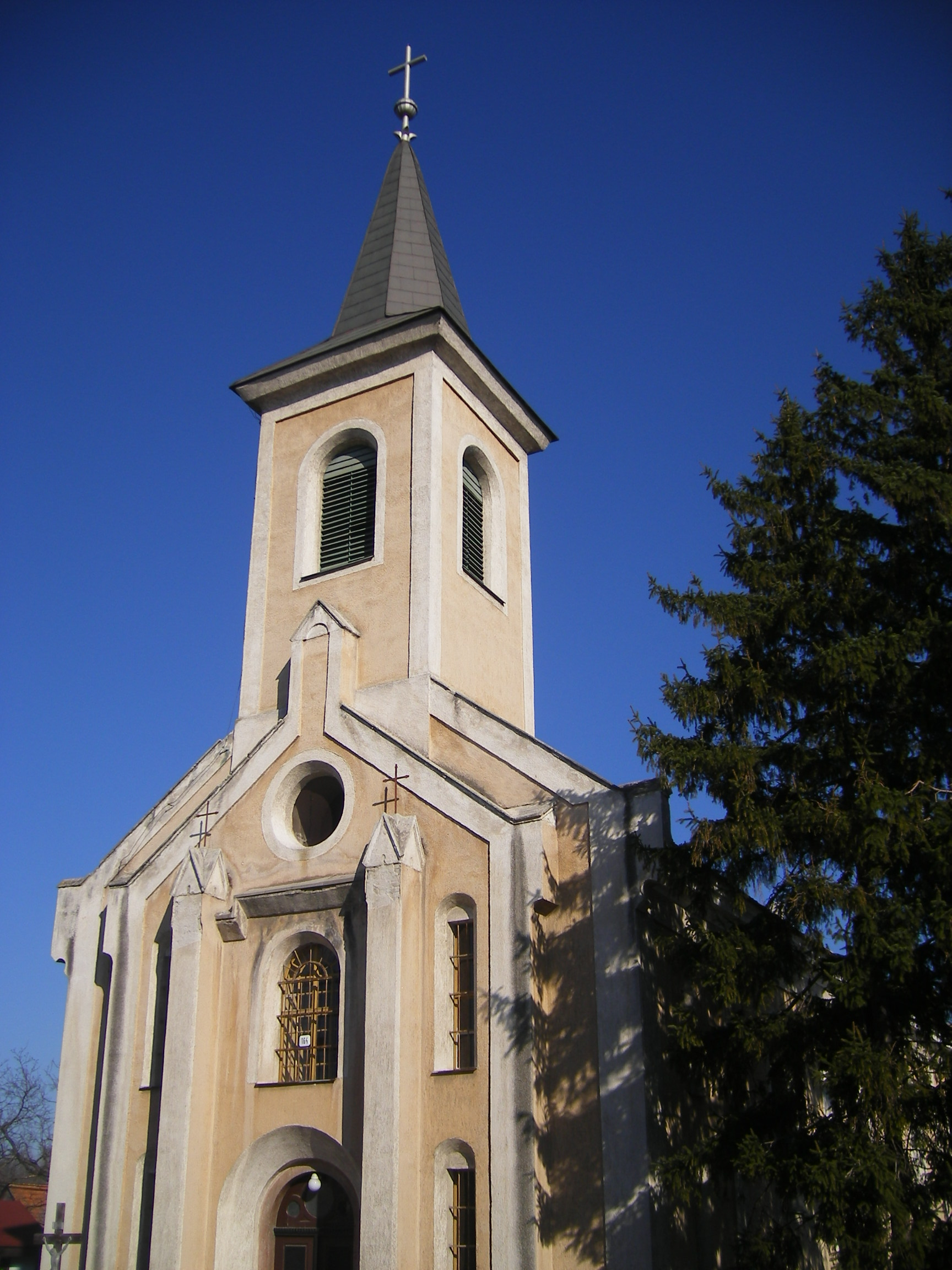
- Church of Saint Wendelin

- Flag Coat of arms

- Location of Kameničná in the Nitra Region Location of Kameničná in Slovakia
- Coordinates: 47.82°N 18.05°E
- Country: Slovakia
- Region: Nitra Region
- District: Komárno District
- First mentioned: 1482

Government
  - Mayor: Dezider Pataki (SMK-MKP)

Area
  - Total: 34.55 km^{2} (13.34 sq mi)
- Elevation: 110 m (360 ft)

Population (2025)
  - Total: 1,892
- Time zone: UTC+1 (CET)
  - Summer (DST): UTC+2 (CEST)
- Postal code: 946 01
- Area code: +421 35
- Vehicle registration plate (until 2022): KN
- Website: www.kamenicna.eu

Kameničná (Hungarian: Keszegfalva, Hungarian pronunciation:[ˈkɛsɛɡfɒlvɒ]) is a village and municipality in the Komárno District in the Nitra Region of southwest Slovakia.

== Geography ==
The village lies on the Váh River, at an altitude of 110 metres and covers an area of 34.55 km².

== Geography ==
The municipality lies at an altitude of 110 metres (360 ft) and covers an area of 34.55 km^{2} (13.34 sq mi) (2025).

== History ==
In the 9th century, the territory of Kameničná became part of the Kingdom of Hungary. In historical records the village was first mentioned in 1482. After the Austro-Hungarian army disintegrated in November 1918, Czechoslovak troops occupied the area, later acknowledged internationally by the Treaty of Trianon. Between 1938 and 1945 Kameničná once more became part of Miklós Horthy's Hungary through the First Vienna Award. From 1945 until the Velvet Divorce, it was part of Czechoslovakia. Since then it has been part of Slovakia.

== Population ==
Population statistic (10 years)
Year	1995	2005	2015	2025
Count	1722	1835	1929	1892
Difference		+6.56%	+5.12%	−1.91%

Population statistic
Year	2024	2025
Count	1921	1892
Difference		−1.50%

It has a population of 1892 people (31 December 2025).

=== Ethnicity ===
Census 2021 (1+ %)
Ethnicity	Number	Fraction
Hungarian	1410	72.9%
Slovak	472	24.4%
Not found out	151	7.8%
Romani	78	4.03%
Total	1934	

In year 2021 was 1934 people by ethnicity 1410 as Hungarian, 472 as Slovak, 151 as Not found out, 78 as Romani, 10 as Czech, 4 as Other, 2 as Polish, 1 as Vietnamese and 1 as German.

Note on population: The difference values of population numbers in the table "Population statistic" and in the sections "Ethnicity" & "Religion" is caused by the use of various statistical methods.

=== Religion ===
Census 2021 (1+ %)
Religion	Number	Fraction
Roman Catholic Church	1017	52.59%
None	593	30.66%
Not found out	129	6.67%
Calvinist Church	118	6.1%
Evangelical Church	27	1.4%
Greek Catholic Church	22	1.14%
Total	1934	

In year 2021 was 1934 people by religion 1017 from Roman Catholic Church, 593 from None, 129 from Not found out, 118 from Calvinist Church, 27 from Evangelical Church, 22 from Greek Catholic Church, 9 from Christian Congregations in Slovakia, 8 from Jehovah's Witnesses, 3 from Other and not ascertained christian church, 3 from Buddhism, 2 from Other, 1 from Islam, 1 from Apostolic Church and 1 from Ad hoc movements.

== Facilities ==
The village has a public library, a cinema, and a football pitch.

== Genealogical resources ==
The records for genealogical research are available at the state archive "Statny Archiv in Nitra, Slovakia"

- Roman Catholic church records (births/marriages/deaths): 1763-1939 (parish A)
- Reformated church records (births/marriages/deaths): 1828-1900 (parish B)

== See also ==
- List of municipalities and towns in Slovakia
