= Csém =

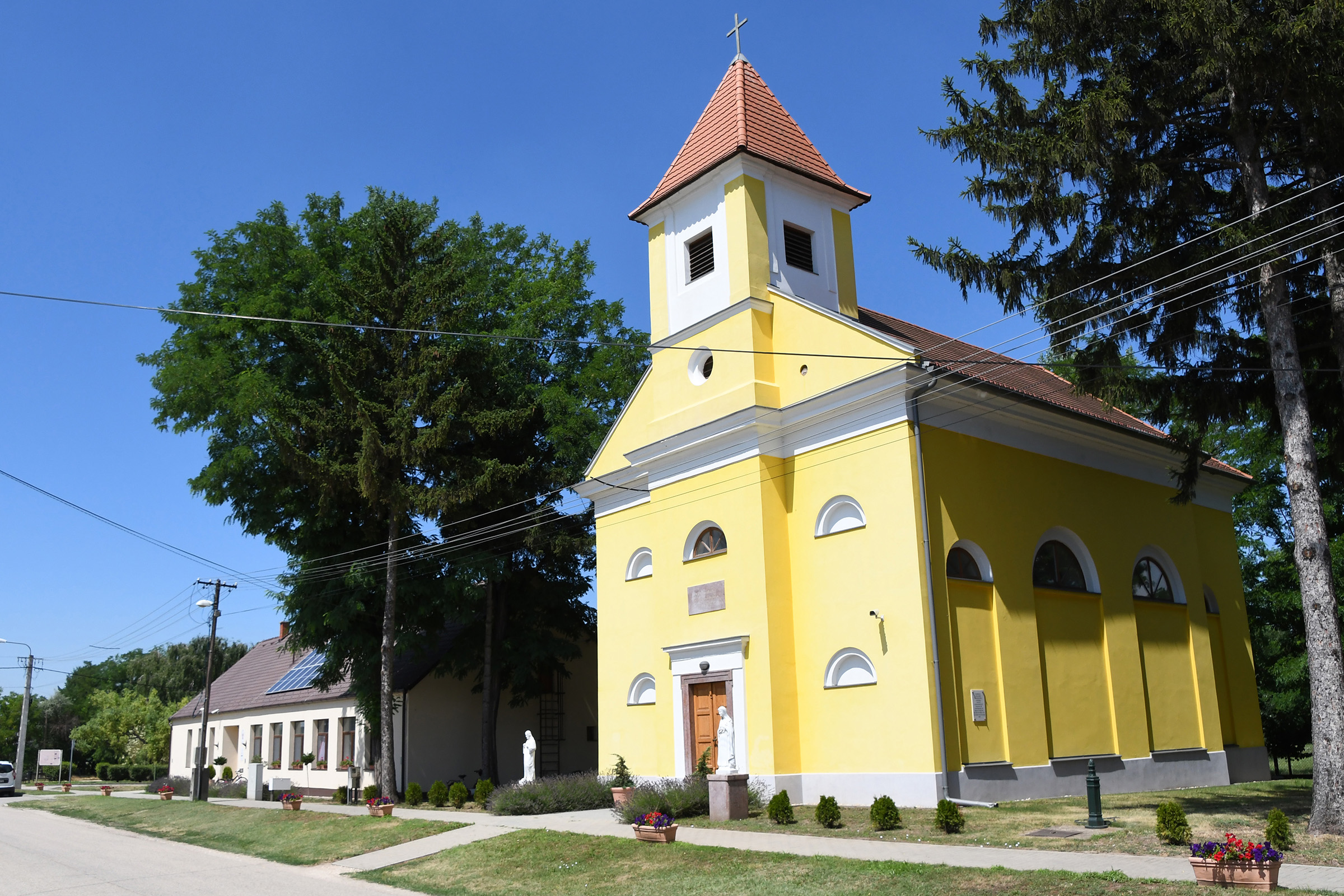
- Village hall and Roman Catholic church on Main Street Csém

- Location of Csém Csém (Europe)
- Coordinates: 47.6812°N 18.0869°E
- Country: Hungary
- County: Komárom-Esztergom

Area
  - Total: 6.29 km^{2} (2.43 sq mi)

Population (2025)
  - Total: 408
  - Density: 62.58/km^{2} (162.1/sq mi)
- Time zone: UTC+1 (CET)
  - Summer (DST): UTC+2 (CEST)
- Postal code: 2949
- Area code: 34
- Motorways: M1
- Distance from Budapest: 85.9 km (53.4 mi) East

Csém is a village in Komárom-Esztergom County, Hungary.

== History ==
Below is a description of the town's history as found on Csém's municipal website as translated by Google:

Csém is a village with four hundred and seventy-five inhabitants in the north-western corner of Komárom-Esztergom county. It is accessible by both road and rail. The name of the settlement can probably be traced back to a personal name. His name first appeared in the form of 'Cem' in a charter in 1209 and was later referred to as 'Chem' (1233) and 'Chemy' (1485). It was the property of the Archabbey of Pannonhalma. The village, destroyed by the Turks in 1547, was difficult to repopulate. By the first half of the 18th Century, Csém-puszta was already the property of the archbishop of Esztergom. In 1848 it had 148 Roman Catholics and 3 Reformed inhabitants. Between the two world wars, there was a one-room Catholic farm school in the village. Administratively, it belonged to Mocsa, Kisigmánd from 1946, then these two settlements were annexed to Nagyigmánd on April 1, 1971, and a joint council was formed. 1989

The oldest building in the village is the Roman Catholic Church of St. Anne. Mother Church Carpenter. The date of construction of the church is unknown, but local tradition holds that its time of construction was hidden in the sum of the Roman numerals composed of the initials of the inscription above the main entrance, which was probably 1854 on this basis. There is a group kindergarten in the village, but there is no primary school. The children go to school in nearby Nagyigmánd. The House of Culture has a large hall for 200 people. There is also a club for the elderly and a 1,100-volume library in the village.

The famous native of the village is Marián Lajos Réthei Prikkel, a Benedictine priest teacher from Esztergom, who was born in 1871 and died in 1925 in Balatonfüred. As a philologist, he researched the old Hungarian language, and as an ethnographer, he collected folk dances. From 1916 he edited the newspaper Esztergom és Vidéke. In the economic life of Csém, horse and cattle breeding, in the 19th century. From the end of the 19th century, due to the proximity of the Ácsi Sugar Factory, sugar beet cultivation played a prominent role. An orchard producing branded pears on its excellent soil has recently been liquidated. No production cooperative has been established in its territory, Komáromi Mezőgazdasági Rt. Manages its land. In addition to local craftsmen meeting the immediate needs of the residents, no industrial sector has settled in the village. Its only mineral resource, the gravel mine and classifier, which is located on concrete and construction gravel, has a significant turnover.

The infrastructure of the settlement is good. Its aqueduct was built in 1949 and its telephone network in 1993 as a result of municipal investments after the change of regime. The roads of the village are in good condition, they were paved after 1990. The gas supply was realized in 1997. The solid waste is disposed of at the solid waste storage site of OTTO Rt. In 2000, the village's drinking water well was completed and the Millennium Memorial Coast was handed over. The area around Csém is an excellent place for excursions, cycling and walking. The two standard-sized grass football pitches and changing rooms in the village sports complex are excellent for resting and playing ball games. The proximity of the Concó stream is an attractive force for lovers of the Waterfront Cool. Kindergarten in 2002, doctor's office in 2003, culture house in 2004,
