= Nesvady =

Nesvady Naszvad
- Municipality
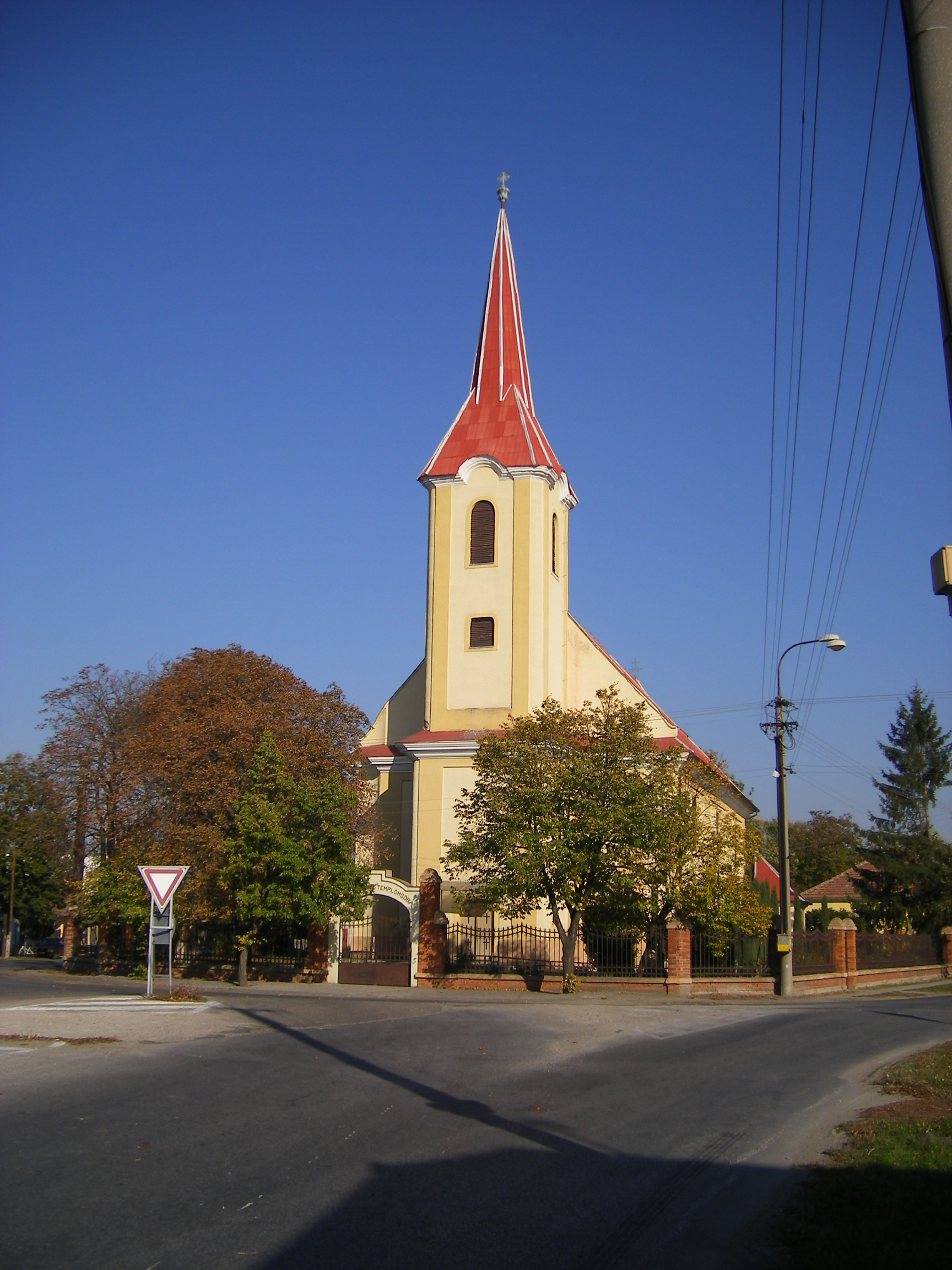
- Church of Saint Joseph

- Flag Coat of arms

- Location of Nesvady in the Nitra Region Location of Nesvady in Slovakia
- Coordinates: 47.93°N 18.12°E
- Country: Slovakia
- Region: Nitra Region
- District: Komárno District
- First mentioned: 1269

Government
  - Mayor: Zoltán Molnár

Area
  - Total: 57.86 km^{2} (22.34 sq mi)
- Elevation: 112 m (367 ft)

Population (2025)
  - Total: 4,970
- Time zone: UTC+1 (CET)
  - Summer (DST): UTC+2 (CEST)
- Postal code: 946 51
- Area code: +421 35
- Vehicle registration plate (until 2022): KN
- Website: www.nesvady.sk

Nesvady (Hungarian: Naszvad, Hungarian pronunciation:[ˈnɒsvɒd]) is a town and municipality in the Komárno District in the Nitra Region of south-west Slovakia. The village was annexed to Czechoslovakia in 1920.

== Geography ==
The municipality lies at an altitude of 112 metres (367 ft) and covers an area of 57.86 km^{2} (22.34 sq mi) (2025). It's on the left bank of the Nitra river, around 23 km north of Komárno, 10 km north-east of Hurbanovo, and 7 km south-west of Nové Zámky. Administratively, the town belongs to the Nitra Region, Komárno District.

== History ==
In the 11th century, the territory of Nesvady became part of the Kingdom of Hungary. In historical records the town was first mentioned in 1269 as Naswod. After the Austro-Hungarian army disintegrated in November 1918, Czechoslovak troops occupied the area, in the 1920, by the Treaty of Trianon the town became part of Czechoslovakia. Between 1938 and 1945 Nesvady became part of Miklós Horthy's Hungary through the First Vienna Award. In 1945, it was recovered by Czechoslovakia. A number of residents were affected by the Beneš decrees and a number of families were forced to move to Hungary in 1947. From 1945 until the Velvet Divorce, it was part of Czechoslovakia. Since then it has been part of Slovakia.

Nesvady had received official town status on the 1 January 2020, and are currently the youngest Slovak town, youngest municipality with urban status.

== Population ==
Population statistic (10 years)
Year	1995	2005	2015	2025
Count	5103	4978	5104	4970
Difference		−2.44%	+2.53%	−2.62%

Population statistic
Year	2024	2025
Count	4963	4970
Difference		+0.14%

It has a population of 4970 people (31 December 2025).

=== Ethnicity ===
Census 2021 (1+ %)
Ethnicity	Number	Fraction
Hungarian	2710	54.04%
Slovak	2211	44.09%
Romani	506	10.09%
Not found out	90	1.79%
Total	5014	

In year 2021 was 5014 people by ethnicity 2710 as Hungarian, 2211 as Slovak, 506 as Romani, 90 as Not found out, 25 as Czech, 9 as Other, 6 as Italian, 5 as Russian, 3 as Ukrainian, 3 as Canadian, 2 as Romanian, 2 as Croatian, 1 as Jewish, 1 as Turkish, 1 as Serbian, 1 as Austrian, 1 as Polish, 1 as Greek, 1 as Bulgarian and 1 as Albanian.

Note on population: The difference values of population numbers in the table "Population statistic" and in the sections "Ethnicity" & "Religion" is caused by the use of various statistical methods.

=== Religion ===
Census 2021 (1+ %)
Religion	Number	Fraction
Roman Catholic Church	3316	66.13%
None	901	17.97%
Evangelical Church	315	6.28%
Baptists Church	183	3.65%
Calvinist Church	76	1.52%
Apostolic Church	69	1.38%
Total	5014	

In year 2021 was 5014 people by religion 3316 from Roman Catholic Church, 901 from None, 315 from Evangelical Church, 183 from Baptists Church, 76 from Calvinist Church, 69 from Apostolic Church, 44 from Not found out, 26 from Christian Congregations in Slovakia, 24 from Jehovah's Witnesses, 23 from Greek Catholic Church, 9 from Other and not ascertained christian church, 7 from Old Catholic Church, 6 from Islam, 4 from Ad hoc movements, 3 from Eastern Orthodox Church, 3 from Other, 2 from United Methodist Church, 2 from Buddhism and 1 from Paganism and natural spirituality.

Nesvady has a population of about 5,000 people. The ethnic make-up is about 60% Hungarian, 35% Slovak, and 5% Romany.

== Facilities ==
The town has a public library, a gym and a football pitch.
