= Kisbér District =

Kisbér District Kisbéri járás
- Districts of Hungary
- Coat of arms

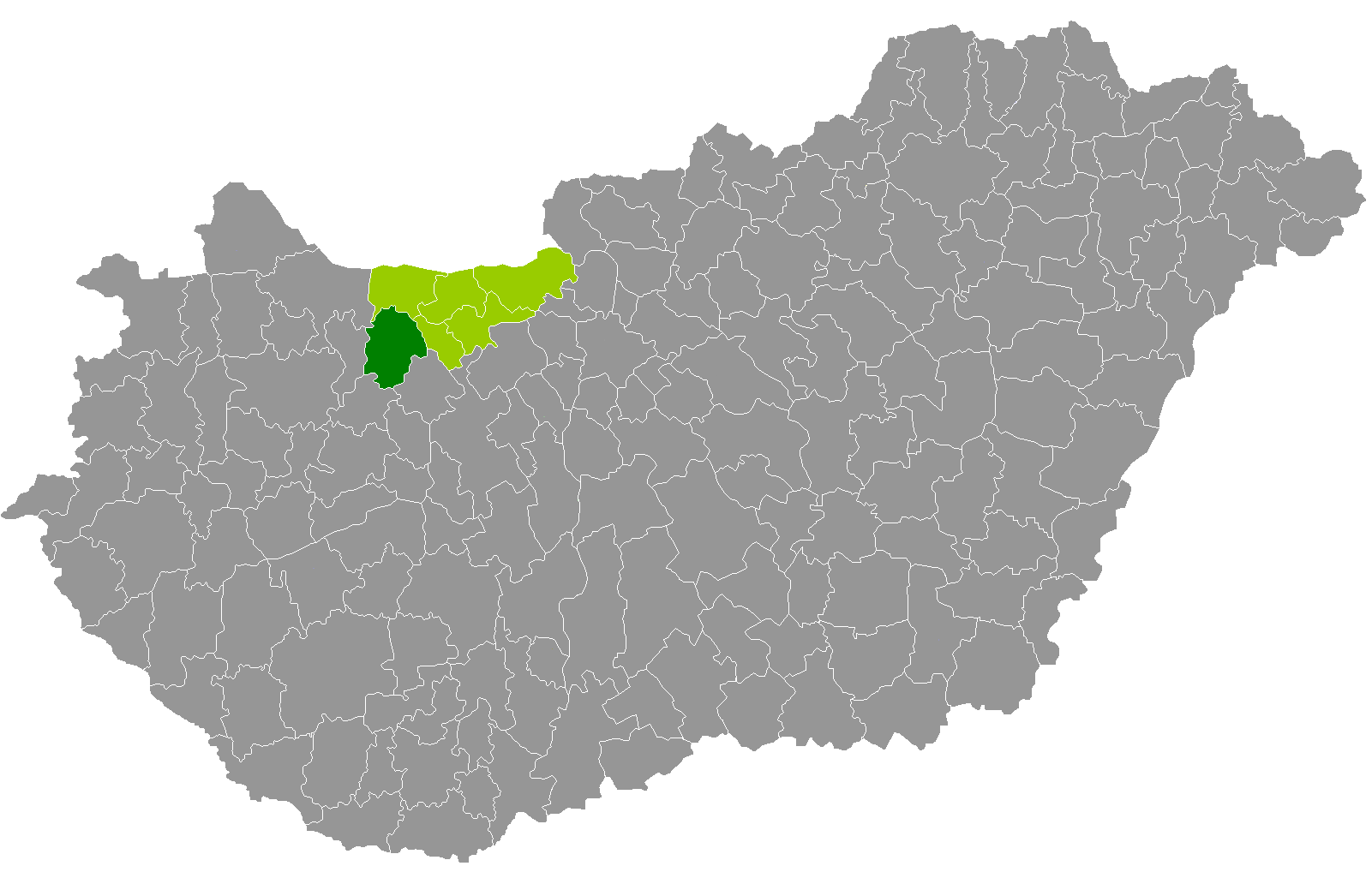
- Kisbér District within Hungary and Komárom-Esztergom County.
- Coordinates: 47.49°N 18.03°E
- Country: Hungary
- County: Komárom-Esztergom
- District seat: Kisbér

Area
  - Total: 510.55 km^{2} (197.12 sq mi)
  - Rank: 2nd in Komárom-Esztergom

Population (2011 census)
  - Total: 20,284
  - Rank: 6th in Komárom-Esztergom
  - Density: 40/km^{2} (100/sq mi)
- Website: Official website

Kisbér (Hungarian: Kisbéri járás) is a district in south-western part of Komárom-Esztergom County. Kisbér is also the name of the town where the district seat is found. The district is located in the Central Transdanubia Statistical Region.

== Geography ==
Kisbér District borders with Komárom District to the north, Oroszlány District to the east, Mór District (Fejér County) to the southeast, Zirc District (Veszprém County) to the southwest, Pannonhalma District and Győr District (Győr-Moson-Sopron County) to the west. The number of the inhabited places in Kisbér District is 17.

== Settlements ==
The district has 1 town and 17 villages, listed with population, as of 1 January 2013:

- Aka (247)
- Ácsteszér (704)
- Ászár (1,713)
- Bakonybánk (451)
- Bakonysárkány (1,012)
- Bakonyszombathely (1,450)
- Bársonyos (774)
- Császár (1,885)
- Csatka (237)
- Csép (349)
- Ete (593)
- Hánta (population included in the town of Kisbér)
- Kerékteleki (689)
- the town of Kisbér (5,432) – district seat
- Réde (1,412)
- Súr (1,232)
- Tárkány (1,518)
- Vérteskethely (553)

== Demographics ==
Religion in Kisbér District (2011 census)
1. Catholic Church (44.4%)
2. Greek Catholicism (0.20%)
3. Calvinism (15.5%)
4. Lutheranism (5.00%)
5. Other religions (1.00%)
6. Non-religious (8.10%)
7. Atheists (0.60%)
8. Undeclared (25.2%)

In 2011, it had a population of 20,284 and the population density was 40/km^{2}.

Year	County population	Change
2011	20,284	n/a

=== Ethnicity ===
Besides the Hungarian majority, the main minorities are the Roma (approx. 350) and German (200).

Total population (2011 census): 20,284
Ethnic groups (2011 census): Identified themselves: 18,120 persons:

- Hungarians: 17,378 (95.91%)
- Gypsies: 353 (1.95%)
- Germans: 199 (1.10%)
- Others and indefinable: 190 (1.05%)

Approx. 2,000 persons in Kisbér District did not declare their ethnic group at the 2011 census.

=== Religion ===
Religious adherence in the county according to 2011 census:

- Catholic – 9,058 (Roman Catholic – 9,010; Greek Catholic – 47);
- Reformed – 3,145;
- Evangelical – 1,013;
- other religions – 190;
- Non-religious – 1,649;
- Atheism – 119;
- Undeclared – 5,110.

== See also ==
- List of cities and towns in Hungary
