= Kisbér =

- Town
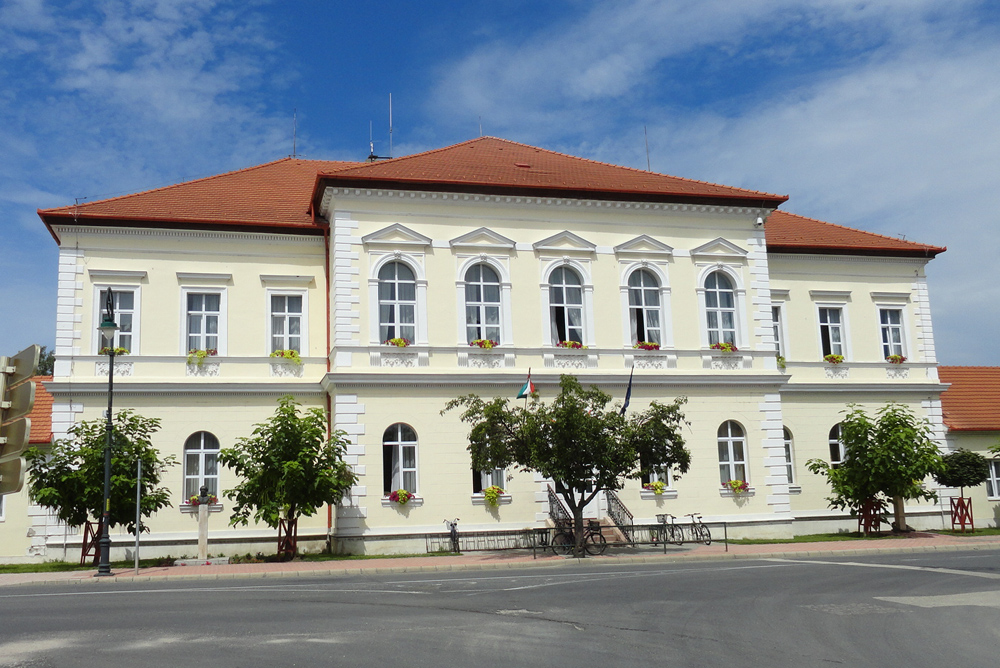

- Flag Coat of arms

- Location of Kisbér
- Coordinates: 47.50166°N 18.02688°E
- Country: Hungary
- County: Komárom-Esztergom
- District: Kisbér

Area
  - Total: 70.86 km^{2} (27.36 sq mi)

Population (2015)
  - Total: 5,348
  - Density: 75.47/km^{2} (195.5/sq mi)
- Time zone: UTC+1 (CET)
  - Summer (DST): UTC+2 (CEST)
- Postal code: 2870
- Area code: (+36) 34
- Website: www.kisber.hu

Kisbér (German: Beer) is a town in northern Hungary, in Komárom-Esztergom county. It is the administrative centre of Kisbér District. The town was first mentioned in 1277.

== Royal Stud ==
Kisber was home to the 15,648-acre (63.33 km^{2}) Imperial-Royal Stud where a Thoroughbred racehorse named for the town was bred under the supervision of Stud's manager, Count Zoest. Foaled in 1873, Kisber raced in England where in 1876 he won that country's most prestigious race, The Derby. He was then sent to Paris where he won France's most important race, the Grand Prix de Paris.

== Twin towns — sister cities ==
Kisbér is twinned with:

- Câmpia Turzii, Romania
- Eslohe, Germany
- Kolárovo, Slovakia
- Vodňany, Czech Republic

== People ==
- Lipót Baumhorn, architect

== Other ==
In 2002, a 40 metres tall wooden cellphone phone tower was erected north of Kisbér at 47.516328 N 17.998730 E. This tower was one of the few wooden radio towers in Hungary. It was replaced by a steel tower in 2015.
