= Zlatná na Ostrove =

Zlatná na Ostrove Csallóközaranyos
- Municipality
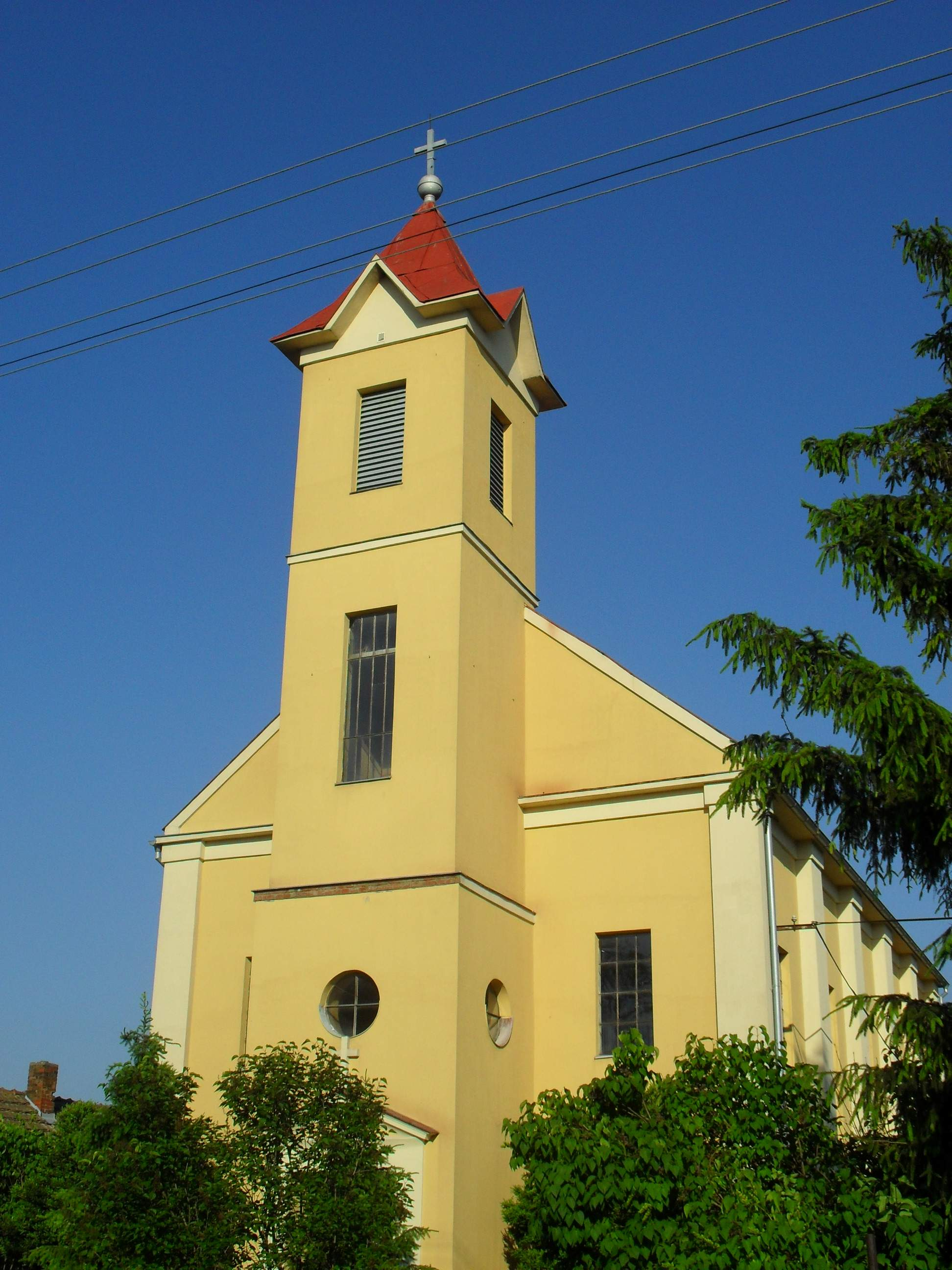
- Church of Saint Stephen

- Flag Coat of arms

- Location of Zlatná na Ostrove in the Nitra Region Location of Zlatná na Ostrove in Slovakia
- Coordinates: 47.77°N 17.97°E
- Country: Slovakia
- Region: Nitra Region
- District: Komárno District
- First mentioned: 1267

Area
  - Total: 35.40 km^{2} (13.67 sq mi)
- Elevation: 110 m (360 ft)

Population (2025)
  - Total: 2,375
- Time zone: UTC+1 (CET)
  - Summer (DST): UTC+2 (CEST)
- Postal code: 946 12
- Area code: +421 35
- Vehicle registration plate (until 2022): KN
- Website: www.obeczlatna.sk

Zlatná na Ostrove (Hungarian: Csallóközaranyos, pronounced [ˈtʃɒlːoːkøzɒrɒɲoʃ]) is a village and municipality in the Komárno District in the Nitra Region of south-west Slovakia.

== Geography ==
The municipality lies at an altitude of 110 metres (360 ft) and covers an area of 35.40 km^{2} (13.67 sq mi) (2025).

== History ==
In the 9th century, the territory of Zlatná na Ostrove became part of the Kingdom of Hungary. In historical records the village was first mentioned in 1267. After the Austro-Hungarian army disintegrated in November 1918, Czechoslovak troops occupied the area, later acknowledged internationally by the Treaty of Trianon. Between 1938 and 1945 Zlatná na Ostrove once more became part of Miklós Horthy's Hungary through the First Vienna Award. From 1945 until the Velvet Divorce, it was part of Czechoslovakia. Since then it has been part of Slovakia.

== Population ==
Population statistic (10 years)
Year	1995	2005	2015	2025
Count	2407	2543	2377	2375
Difference		+5.65%	−6.52%	−0.08%

Population statistic
Year	2024	2025
Count	2380	2375
Difference		−0.21%

It has a population of 2375 people (31 December 2025).

=== Ethnicity ===
Census 2021 (1+ %)
Ethnicity	Number	Fraction
Hungarian	1852	76.27%
Not found out	360	14.82%
Slovak	357	14.7%
Total	2428	

In year 2021 was 2428 people by ethnicity 1852 as Hungarian, 360 as Not found out, 357 as Slovak, 22 as Romani, 7 as Czech, 3 as Other, 2 as Turkish, 1 as Jewish and 1 as German.

Note on population: The difference values of population numbers in the table "Population statistic" and in the sections "Ethnicity" & "Religion" is caused by the use of various statistical methods.

=== Religion ===
Census 2021 (1+ %)
Religion	Number	Fraction
None	1011	41.64%
Roman Catholic Church	646	26.61%
Calvinist Church	373	15.36%
Not found out	311	12.81%
Evangelical Church	29	1.19%
Total	2428	

In year 2021 was 2428 people by religion 1011 from None, 646 from Roman Catholic Church, 373 from Calvinist Church, 311 from Not found out, 29 from Evangelical Church, 19 from Jehovah's Witnesses, 15 from Greek Catholic Church, 6 from Baptists Church, 5 from Christian Congregations in Slovakia, 4 from Other, 3 from Eastern Orthodox Church, 2 from Seventh-day Adventist Church, 2 from Buddhism, 1 from Old Catholic Church and 1 from Ad hoc movements.

== Facilities ==
The village has a public library and a football pitch.
