= Nagyigmánd =

- Large village
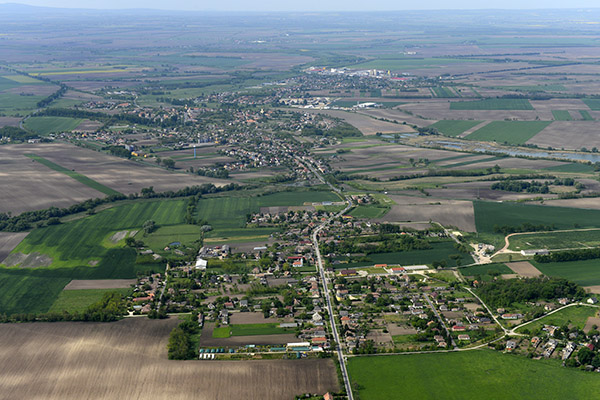
- Aerial view

- Coat of arms

- Location of Komárom-Esztergom county in Hungary

- Location of Nagyigmánd
- Coordinates: 47.63253°N 18.05569°E
- Country: Hungary
- County: Komárom-Esztergom
- District: Komárom

Area
  - Total: 51.39 km^{2} (19.84 sq mi)

Population (2004)
  - Total: 3,166
  - Density: 61.6/km^{2} (160/sq mi)
- Time zone: UTC+1 (CET)
  - Summer (DST): UTC+2 (CEST)
- Postal code: 2942
- Area code: (+36) 34
- Website: http://nagyigmand.hu/

Nagyigmánd is a village in Komárom-Esztergom county, Hungary. It is the site of an ancient earthwork fort.

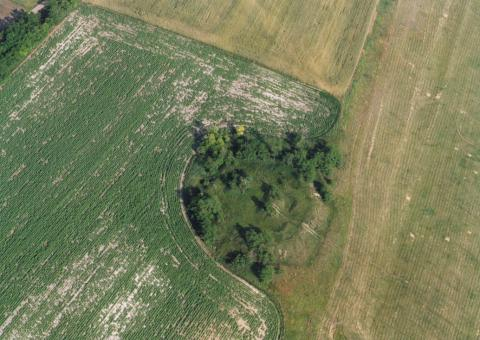
Nagyigmánd, earthwork fort from above

== Sights ==
There are two churches in this village, a Catholic one and a Protestant one (the latter belongs to the Hungarian Reformed Church).

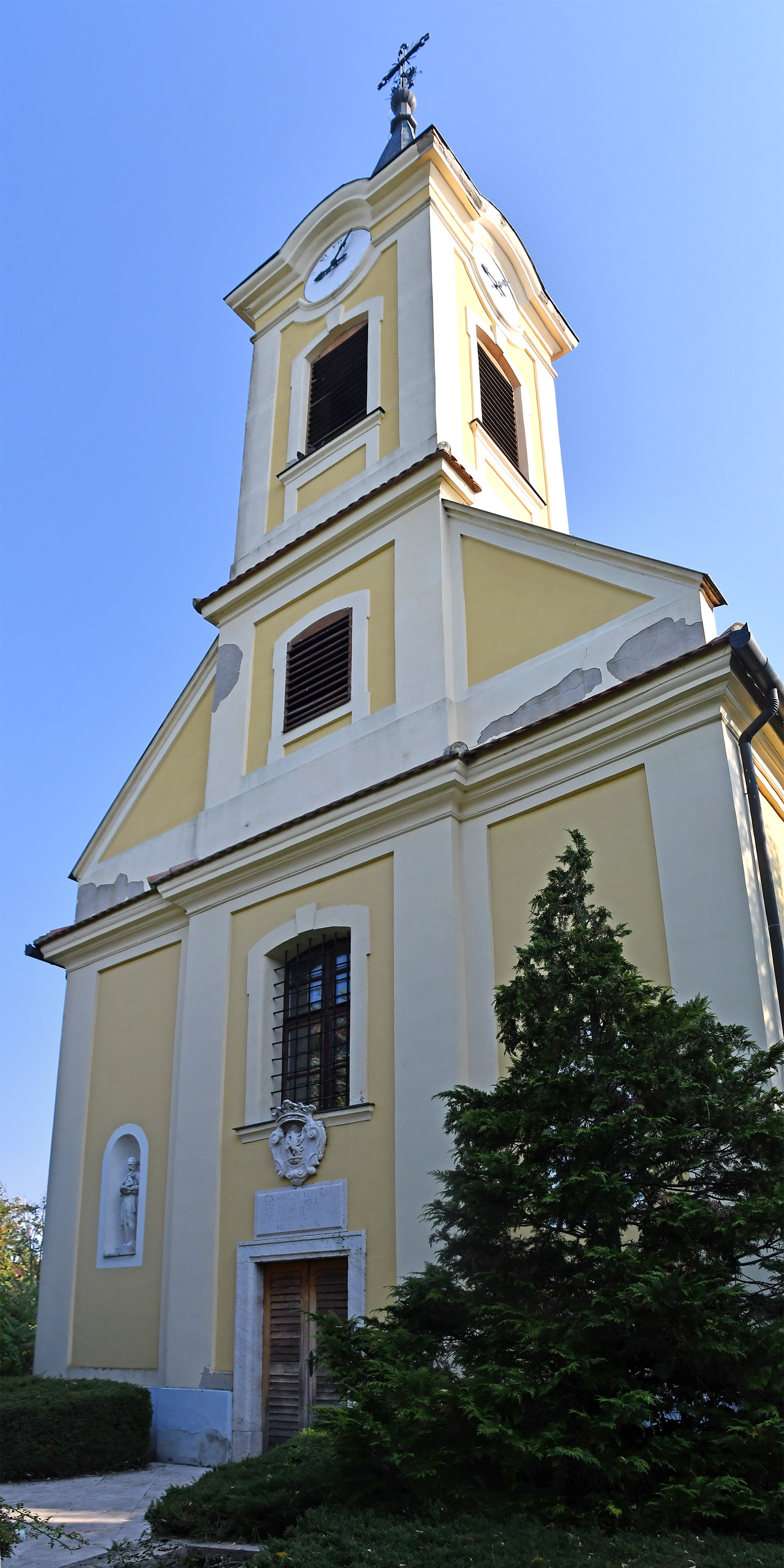
Catholic Church of St. Michael.

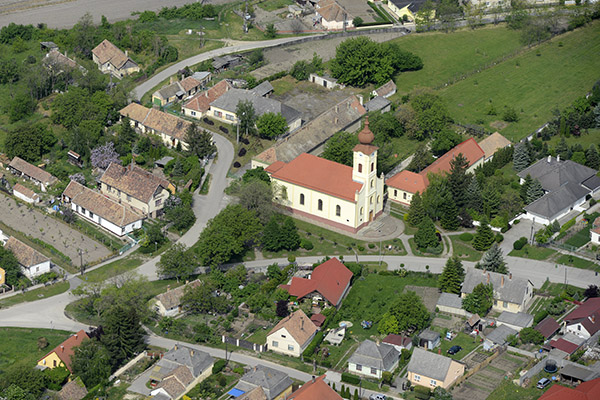
Reformed Church.

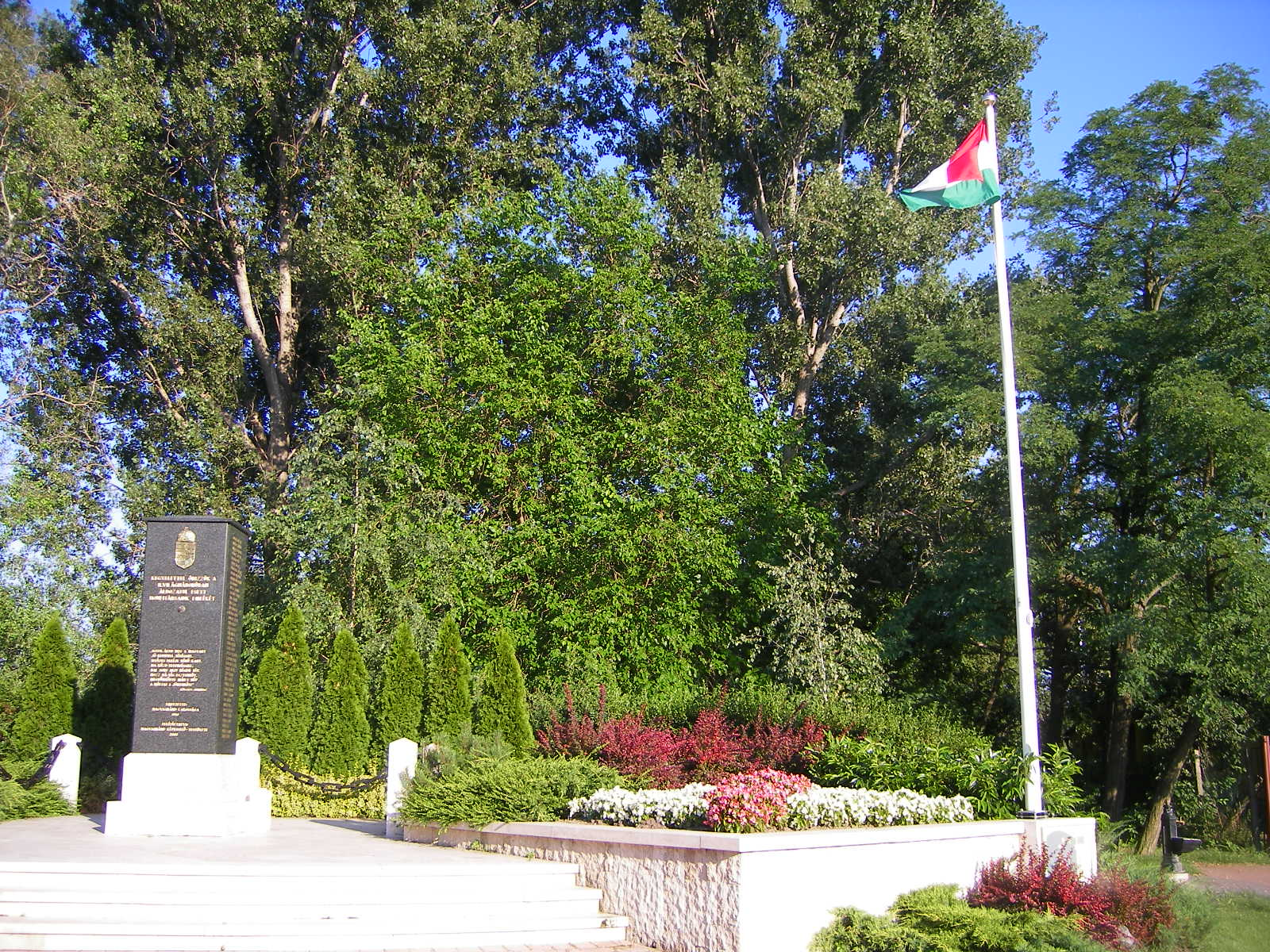
Memorial for the fallen soldiers of World War II.
