= Mocsa =

- Location of Komárom-Esztergom county in Hungary

- Location of Mocsa
- Coordinates: 47.67120°N 18.18465°E
- Country: Hungary
- County: Komárom-Esztergom

Government
  - Mayor: Marianna Udvardi

Area
  - Total: 67.22 km^{2} (25.95 sq mi)

Population (2025)
  - Total: 2,106
  - Density: 31.18/km^{2} (80.8/sq mi)
- Time zone: UTC+1 (CET)
  - Summer (DST): UTC+2 (CEST)
- Postal code: 2911
- Area code: 34
- Motorways: M1
- Distance from Budapest: 83.3 km (51.8 mi) East

Mocsa is a village in Komárom-Esztergom county, Hungary.

== Early history ==
The village is first mentioned in 1237–1240 under the name of Mocha in the notes of Albeus, Dean of Nitra, who had been asked by Béla IV of Hungary to catalogue the territories of the villages in the area.

During the Árpád Dynasty, the village was a property of the king; income from the land was used to maintain the queen's court. The king's hunters and falconers lived in Mocsa.

In 1291, Fennena of Kujavia, the first wife of Andrew III of Hungary, granted the village's territory to Lodomer, the Archbishop of Esztergom. From this point on, the land was largely the property of the bishops.

During the reign of Béla IV, Mocsa had about 450 residents. The villages in the area were mostly razed to the ground during the Tatar invasions, but the survivors helped to repopulate Mocsa by grouping together. Through the centuries the village was attacked on more than one occasion. Its survival is due to its location: a swampy, weedy, low-lying land that was unattractive to the invaders who preferred to travel over hilly lands that gave them a wide view of the places below. Mocsa's location also provided plenty of hiding places for the people and their animals. In times of draught, the residents survived because of their close proximity to water.

After the Battle of Mohács, the country suffered with years of taxation and occupation by the Ottoman Turks. Many villages died out entirely, and their territories were connected to the surviving villages—Mocsa being one of the survivors.

== World wars ==
530 soldiers from Mocsa fought in World War I, of whom 61 died.

In World War II, there were 740 soldiers from the village; 215 were killed. Between March 18–26, 1945, Mocsa was liberated by Soviet troops after a bloody battle. Over the following years, unexploded ordnance from the war injured at least 20 people, with four (including a ten-year-old boy) killed.

== Churches ==
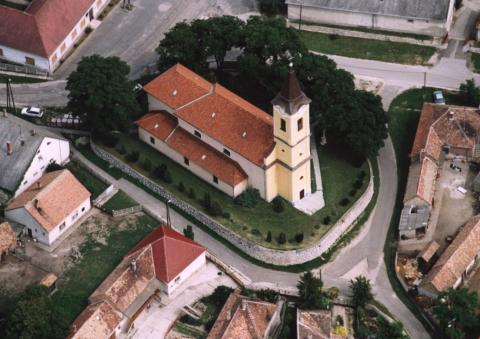
Mocsa's Roman Catholic church

Mocsa's Roman Catholic church was built in 1756 in the Baroque style. It was burned down along with the village in 1903, but was restored the following year.

The Protestant church was built in 1783. It was irrecoverably damaged by artillery during World War II; a new church was built in 1955.
