= Third Battle of Komárom (1849) =

Battle of the Hungarian War of Independence.

Coordinates: 47°44′08.1″N 18°06′19.9″E

- Part of the Hungarian Revolution of 1848
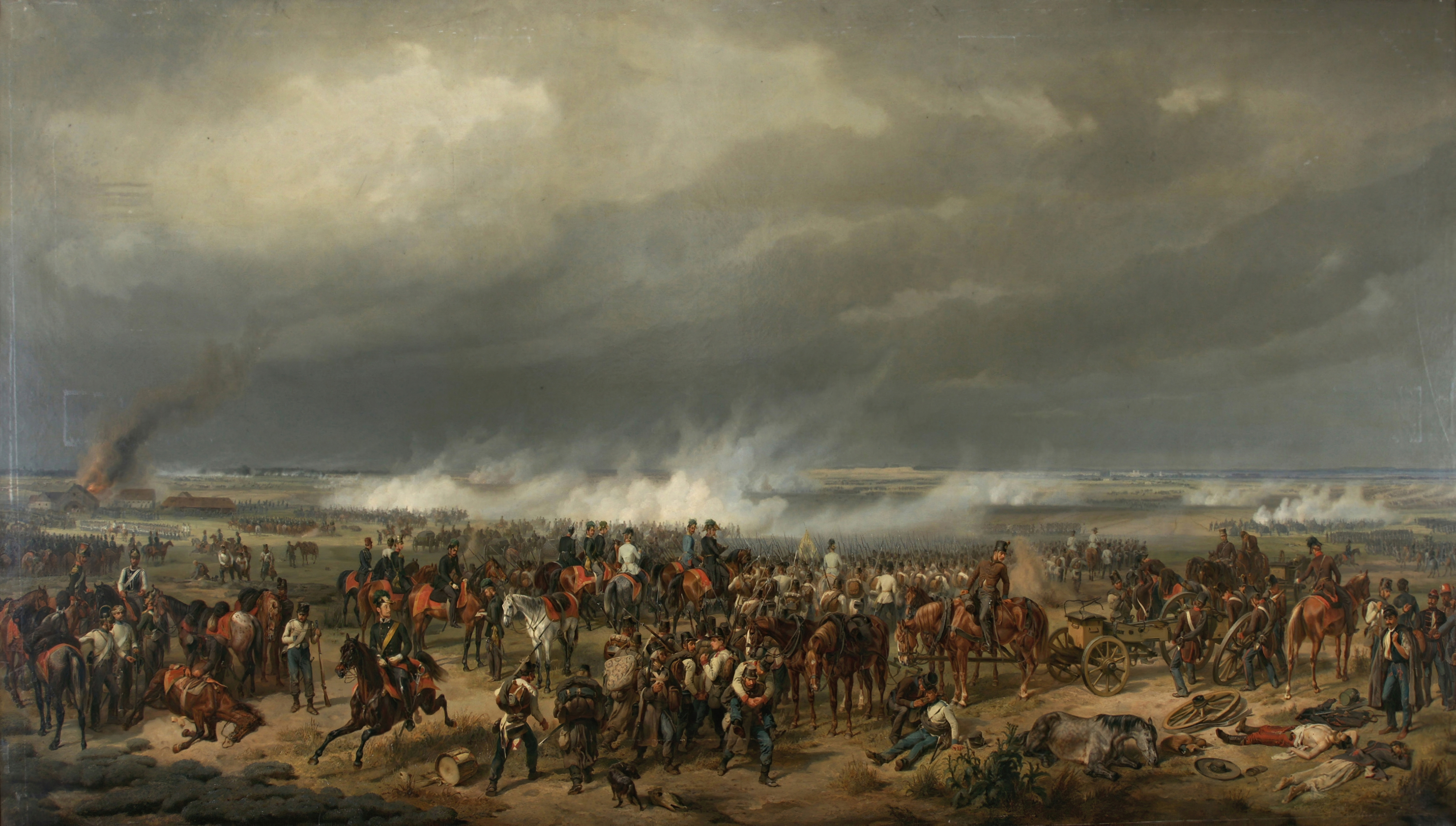
Date	11 July 1849
Location	Komárom, Kingdom of Hungary
Result	Austro-Russian victory

Belligerents
Hungarian Revolutionary Army	Austrian Empire; Russian Empire

Commanders and leaders
György Klapka; Károly Leiningen-Westerburg; Ernő Poeltenberg	Julius Jacob von Haynau; Franz Schlik; Ludwig von Wohlgemuth; Feodor Sergeyevich Panyutyin; Ivan Paskevich

Strength
Total: 43,347 men: I. corps: 8,573; II. corps: 5,925; III. corps: 7,766; VII. corps: 11,046; VIII. corps: 5,702; Other units: 4,335; 180 cannons	Total: 56,787 men: I. corps: 18,224; III. corps units: 4,923; Reserve corps: 15,008; Cavalry division: 4,254; Panyutyin division: 11,672; Other units: 2,706; 242 cannons

Casualties and losses
Total: 400/500/800/1,500 men	Total: 813 men: 124 dead; 608 wounded; 81 missing and captured

The main aim of the third Battle of Komárom was to push back the Austrian army, easing the task of the Hungarian army to retreat towards South-East. The Hungarian Government agreed on a Hungarian attack against the Austrian troops led by Julius Jacob von Haynau, which was stationing to East and South-East from the fortress of Komárom. On 11 July the Hungarian army started to attack the Austrians. Although General Artúr Görgei was the commander of the Hungarian Army of the Upper Danube, General György Klapka took over the command of Görgey's army because of Görgey's injury in the Second Battle of Komárom from 2 July 1849. New Hungarian troops arrived under the command of Ármin Görgey, and from Bátorkeszi under József Nagysándor, decreasing the Hungarian numerical disadvantage in relation to the Austrian army led by Julius Jacob von Haynau.

The Hungarian army's (comprising 58 infantry battalions, 68 cavalry battalions, and 200 cannon) corps which participated in the attack against the Austrian positions were under the command of Colonel Ferenc Aschermann, Ernő Poeltenberg (II. corps), Károly Leiningen-Westerburg (III. corps), József Nagysándor (I. corps) and General Gusztáv Pikéthy (the Pikéthy cavalry division). The right flank fought with Schlik's corps. Although Leiningen was successful in pushing back the Austrian troops around Csém, as well as the II. corps too, which advanced through the Meggyfa- and Ács forests, the Hungarians could not turn these successes to their advantage because of the inactivity of Nagysándor and Pikéthy. At Csém there was a fierce artillery fight with great losses.

The battle finished at 5 pm with the retreat of the Hungarian troops. The Austrians lost 800 men, while the losses of the Hungarians are uncertain. This battle was the bloodiest fight during the revolution. Although the Hungarians did not achieve the victory, they still managed to start their retreat from Komárom, leaving a contingent of nearly 20 000 soldiers to defend the fortress under General Klapka.

== Background ==
In the Second Battle of Komárom from 2 July 1849, the commander of the Army of the Northern Danube, General Artúr Görgei, suffered a serious head injury, as a result of which he was lying unconscious until 4 July, between life and death. Before the battle of 2 July, as a result of a misunderstunding between him and the Governor-President of Hungary Lajos Kossuth, the latter removed him from the position of the main commandement of the Hungarian main army, leaving him only with the position of War Minister, appointing in his place as the head of the army Lieutenant General Lázár Mészáros, but the message with this decision arrived to Komárom only after the battle.

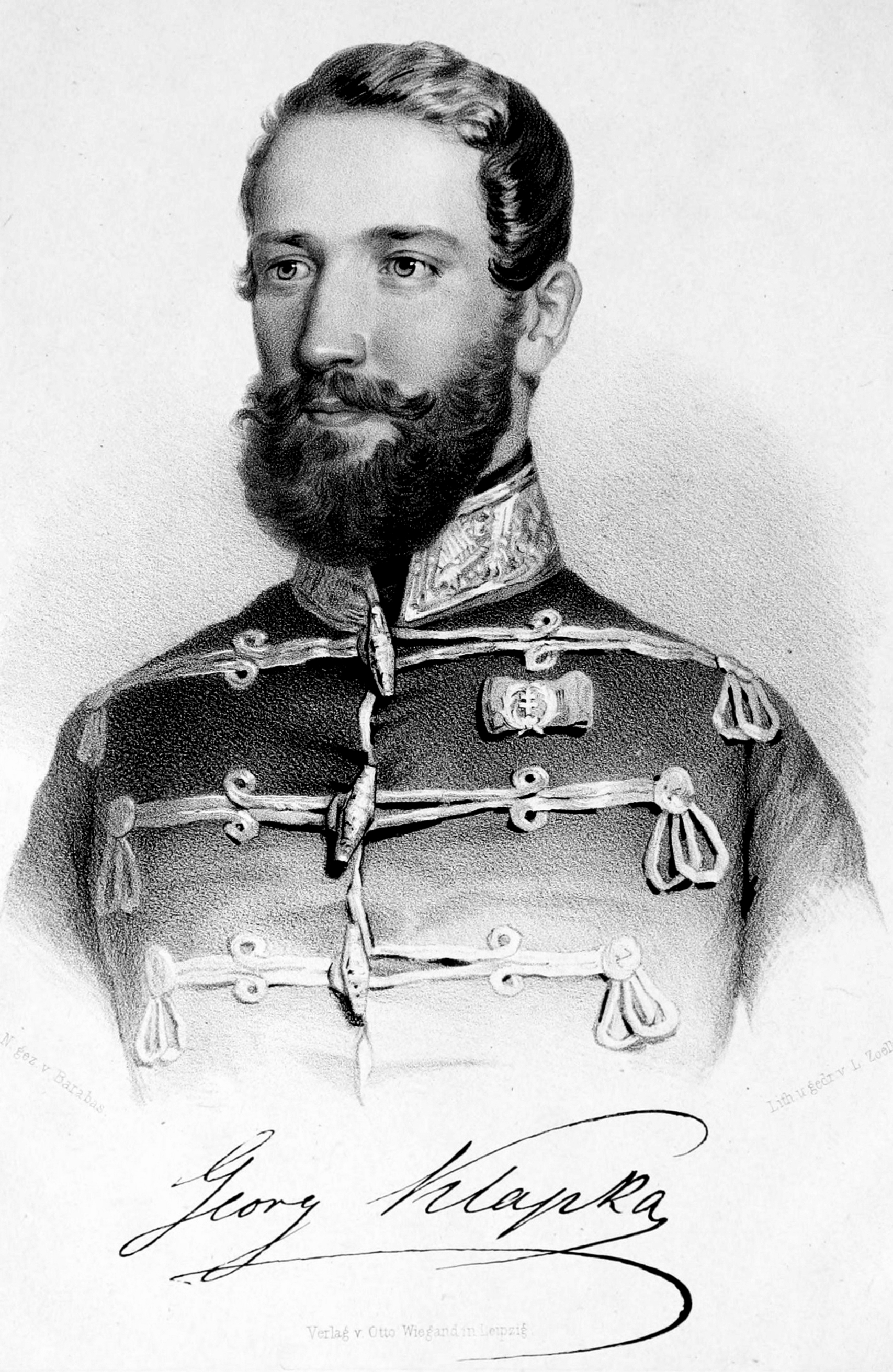
Portrait of György Klapka

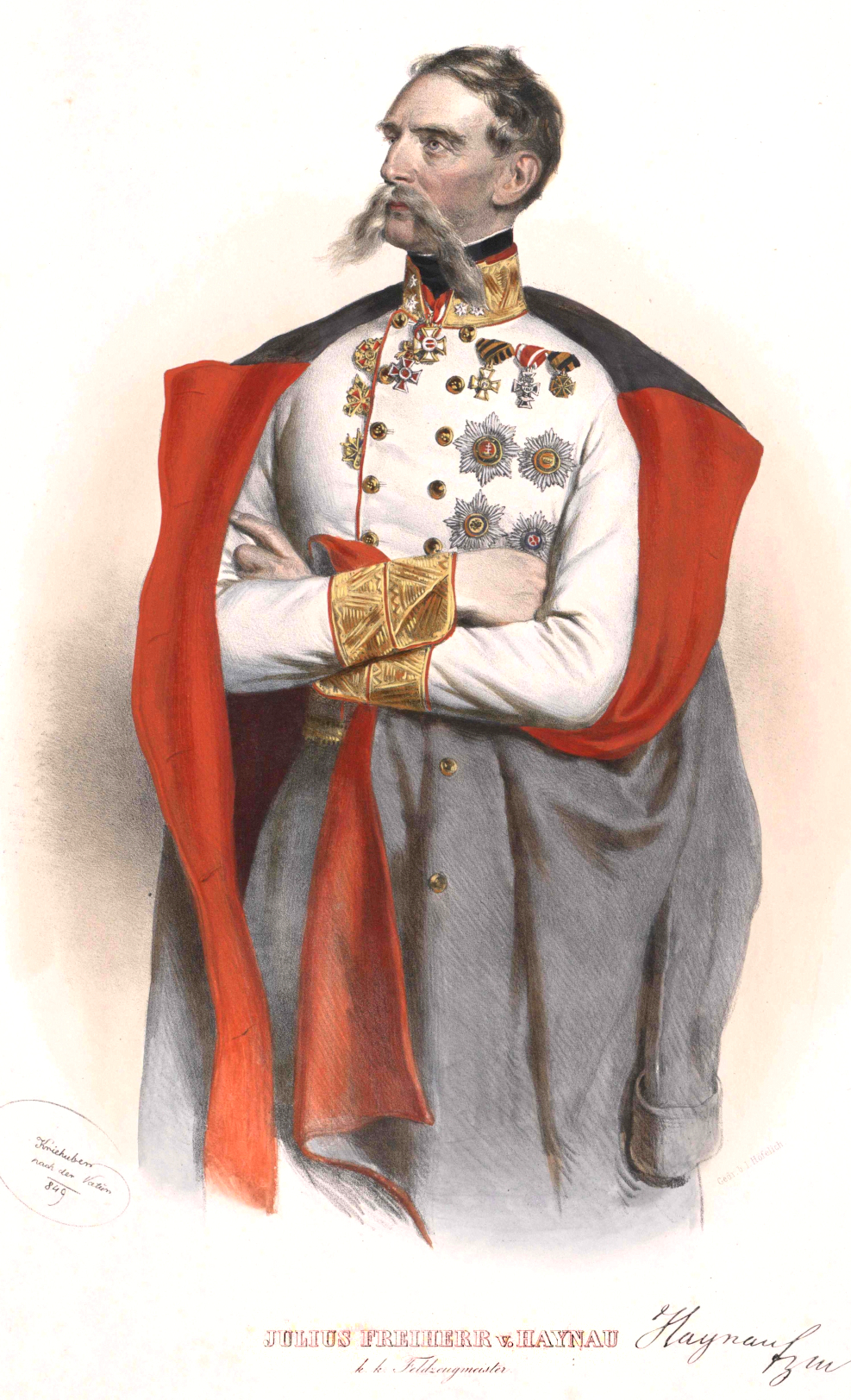
Julius von Haynau

Major General György Klapka, who, as senior officer was replacing the temporarily unconscious Görgei, a meeting of the Hungarian officers, presenting them Kossuth's decision, but the Hungarian officers protested, affirming their loyalty towards Görgei, and they sent Klapka and General József Nagysándor to the capital, to express the armies support to Görgei, and their opposition to Kossuth's decision in the ministry council. As a result of their resolution, the ministry council held at 5 July dismissed Görgei, on his own demand from his post as Minister of War, but allowed him to remain in the lead of the army until he arrived with the Army of the Upper Danube from Komárom to the joining point of the main Hungarian troops around Szeged, with the condition to accept Lieutenant General Mészáros as high commander. They decided that in Komárom, under the command of Colonel Ferenc Aschermann, 18 000 men had to remain, while the rest of the army was to hurry towards south to unite with the Hungarian forces concentrating there against the Russian army and Josip Jelačić's Austrian Army of the South. They designated as the date of the departure of the Army of the Upper Danube 7 July, under the leadership of Major General György Klapka, who had to fulfil the duties temporarily of the convalescent Görgei. The ministry council also authorized the Army of the Northern Danube to make a Reconnaissance-in-force on the right shore of the Danube against the imperial forces, stipulating to the Hungarian army to retreat towards Szeged even if they score a victory. But if they consider that the enemy forces are too strong, to abstain from battle. Meanwhile, Lázár Mészáros tried to do everything to hurry the troops departure towards Szeged, in order to cross the Danube at Buda before the Russian troops led by Field Marshal Ivan Paskevich arrive there to cut their retreat route. He considered that they have 48 hours to arrive to the capital before the Russians. In order to facilitate the marching away of the main troops towards southeast on the right bank of the Danube, he proposed to the troops which had to remain in Komárom after Görgei's departure, to demonstrate west to the fortress in front of Haynau's army, binding the Austrians attention on themselves.

On 6 July in the military council held at Komárom, the officers argued on which shore of the Danube to retreat the Hungarian army towards Pest. Görgei who, despite being convalescent, was present in the council, proposed a Hungarian attack at 9 July against the forces of Field Marshall Julius Jacob von Haynau, in order to facilitate the upcoming march of the Upper Danube Army towards southeast. Görgei considered that a victory against the Austrian main army was necessary, before marching to the meeting point in the south. Only Klapka and Nagysándor disagreed with this plan but the military council accepted Görgei's plan.

But in the next day, Klapka, received a letter from Kossuth, signed also by prime minister Bertalan Szemere, asking him to start immediately the march towards Szeged. After discussing with the chief of staff Colonel József Bayer, but without informing Görgei, who was feeling ill that day, he ordered to the I Corps led by Nagysándor, to start their march towards Pest. The 8500 soldiers of Nagysándor started their march towards Vác in the next day, but Görgei took notice about this, and resigned as a protest against this decision, but the council of the officers convinced him to take back the leadership of the army, and they convinced Klapka as well to call back the I Corps to Komárom. These events caused a delay in the implementation of the attack planned to 9 July, so the Hungarians decided to attack at 11 July, also hoping with this to lull the Austrians' vigilance. Instead of the still convalescent Görgei, Klapka was appointed to lead the attack of the Hungarian army.

On 8 July Klapka wrote a letter to Kossuth in which he declared that although he taught that Görgei's plan to attack Haynau was pointless and that he did not believe in its success, he remains loyal to Görgei, and implores Kossuth and the government to renounce to the repeated attempts to remove the high commander because this will generate more conflicts between the political and military leadership, from which only the enemy will profit.

In the days before the battle the government, the ministry council, and the high commandment represented by Lieutenant General Mészáros issued contradictory decisions regarding the remaining of the Army of Upper Danube in Komárom, or its departure, as well as its route towards Southern Hungary. Mészáros, although that he wanted to hurry up the departure, on 7 July he considered that it would be very dangerous to break through the enemy blockade, so it would be better to remain at Komárom with 40,000 soldiers to tie down the twice numerous enemy troops, and to send only 3000 hussars towards Paks. Later he wrote that because of the danger of the enemy's approach, he is forced to make the Chain bridge unusable, and the only still usable way for the army to march to the meeting point at Szeged was on the left bank of the Danube, through Vác, but its safer to remain in Komárom. Kossuth wrote on 8 July that the Army of the Upper Danube should march towards Southern Hungary through Transdanubia, but its main goal must be "defeating the Austrian army". He also wanted, instead of continuing their march towards Szeged, to stop with the IX. corps led by General Józef Wysocki and General Arisztid Dessewffy and the newly formed X. corps of General Mór Perczel, the Russian troops in Tiszántúl. This was caused probably that he probably understood the mistake of the order, decided on 29 June, to retreat the army, without a fight, from the majority of the country to Southern Hungary. But Mészáros and Dembiński were unhappy with this decision.

On the Austrian side Field Marshal Haynau knew that he cannot move away from Komárom, one of the most modern fortification system of the empire, until the Hungarian Army of the Upper Danube, with its 40,000 soldiers was behind its walls. If he moved away eastwards from it to Pest and Buda, the army of Görgei could sortie and cut his supply routes, and advance towards Vienna. He knew that although twice more numerous, he cannot attack with his troops the fortifications, because the 246 cannons of various caliber, of Komárom could cause huge losses to them. So he had no other choice then to stay in front of Komárom. Haynau hoped that the Russian troops from northern Hungary will help him by blockading Komárom on the left banks of the Danube, but the division of Lieutenant General Pavel Hristoforovich Grabbe of almost 13,000 soldiers did not came there because its duty was to guard the roads towards Galitia, while the Russian main army led by Field Marshal Ivan Paskevich on 10 July was only at Mezőkövesd and Gyöngyös, to 10 days of marching. So Haynau was forced to keep the Austrian II. corps on the left bank of the Danube, north from Komárom, to keep an eye there, if the Hungarians want to do something on the northern shore of the Danube. In order to ensure the connection of the II. corps with the bulk of his army from the right bank of the Danube, Haynau's troops built a bridge between Lovadpuszta and Aranyos, with emplacements for heavy cannons on its both bridgeheads, in order to send troops over it, if the II. corps was attacked.

So Haynau had only one choice: to wait. But he knew that an army of 40,000 soldiers could soon run out of supplies, and this can force them to do two possible things: to retreat towards Pest, or to attack his troops and defeat them. Haynau was certain that if Görgei tries to sortie from the fortress, and to break the Austrian lines, he can defend himself with his superior forces. He calculated that even if the Hungarians succeed to defeat his troops, they will be still forced to retreat towards Szeged, so he will became soon the attacker again, because he will pursue them. And if the Hungarians try to retreat towards Pest, then he will pursue them, leaving smaller forces at Komárom to blockade the fortress.

According to the Table of organization of the Austrian army around Komárom, under the leadership of Haynau were the following troops:

- I. corps: 17,879 soldiers, 54 cannons;
- II. corps: 12,987 soldiers, 42 cannons;
- III. corps: 17,279 soldiers, 48 cannons;
- Reserve (IV.) corps: 15,343 soldiers, 54 cannons;
- Cavalry division: c.4000 soldiers, 12 cannons;
- Main artillery reserve: 1198 soldiers, 78 cannons;
- Panyutyin division (starting number): 12,907, 48 cannons;
Total: 81,593 soldiers, 336 cannons.

Haynau's plan was to concentrate as many troops as it was possible around Komárom, and to depart, at some point with some of his troops towards Pest.

== Prelude ==
In the forthcoming battle, the Hungarians were numerically in a better situation than in the earlier battle from 2 July, in which the Hungarians (26 796 soldiers and 131 cannons) led by Görgei repulsed the two times more numerous (52 185 soldiers and 234 cannons) imperial army led by Haynau. After the aforementioned battle the I corps led by General József Nagysándor and the detachment of Ármin Görgey, which until then were guarding North-West Hungary, arrived in Komárom. Haynau's troops could have been more numerous than this if he would have not sent some troops westwards towards Buda. Haynau - who had moved his headquarters to Nagyigmánd in the meantime - finally decided on 9 July, to send the 3rd Corps and a detachment from the cavalry division towards Buda-Pest, only the Wolf brigade remaining from this corps at Mocsa and Tata, on the South-Western edge of the future battlefield. Two companies of the Wolf brigade remained at Dunaalmás, but after a while, they had to depart towards Esztergom. After the departure of the III. corps, Haynau still had at his disposition more than 55,000 soldiers.

With the arrival at Komárom of the troops from the left bank of the Danube, Klapka had the following number of soldiers and cannons at his disposition:

- I. corps (led by General József Nagysándor): 55 infantry companies, 12 cavalry companies, 8,573 soldiers, 31 cannons;
- II. corps (led by Colonel József Kászonyi): 61 infantry companies, 8 cavalry companies, 5,925 soldiers, 37 cannons;
- III. corps (led by General Károly Leiningen-Westerburg): 53 infantry companies, 12 cavalry companies, 7,766 soldiers, 40 cannons;
- VII. corps (led by General Ernő Poeltenberg): 63 infantry companies, 17 cavalry companies, 11,046 soldiers, 44 cannons;
- VIII. corps (led by General György Klapka): 44 infantry companies, 5,702 soldiers, 14 cannons;
- The Görgey and Horváth detachment: 27 ½ infantry companies, 5 ½ cavalry companies, 4,335 soldiers, 14 cannons;

Total: 303 ½ infantry companies, 54 ½ cavalry companies, 43,347 soldiers, 180 cannons.

So Klapka's troops to 43 347 soldiers and 180 cannons, while Haynau had at his disposition 56 787 soldiers and 242 cannons (I., III., IV. corps, the cavalry division, and the Panyutyin division).

Haynau expected a Hungarian attack, from the Austrian reconnaissance of the enemy troops. He taught that the Hungarians will try only a smaller attack with limited forces, but he still wanted to take all the precautions, to avoid any unpleasant surprise. After the battle of 2 July he ordered the construction of fortifications, to barricade the entrances to the Ács forest, and to build ramparts at Herkály-puszta and Csém. An order issued on the morning of 11 July alerted the corps and division commanders to the conduct to be followed in the event of a possible Hungarian night sortie. It was clear from this that the camp was organized in such a way as to make it possible to immediately take, if necessary, the order of battle. The camping of the different corps and divisions had to be sufficiently deep and structured, fortified with camp fortifications, with the ability to close the gaps. Haynau drew attention to all the organizational tasks that might require the soldiers to take up defensive formations immediately, to repel enemy attempts to break the lines, to counterattack if possible, or, if necessary, to retreat in an orderly manner. The subordinate commanders had to know the exact position of neighboring formations to avoid shooting at each other. Haynau also drew special attention to the area between Mocsa and Csém-Puszta, where the enemy might try to break through. In such a situation, the troops camped here should not retreat, but had to attack the enemy's flank in the center. In his order, Haynau specifically addresses the situation of the II. Corps, which seems to concern him despite the measures taken. In the event of an attack, the bridgehead had to be reinforced immediately, and, if was not attacked, the designated brigade of the 1st Corps, was to be rushed to the II. corps's support.

Before the battle, Haynau's troops were positioned as follows. The I corps led by General Franz Schlik constituted the left flank, with the Ács woods held by the Schneider brigade, reinforced by the 2nd Battalion of the Reischach Brigade, between the village Ács and the Ács forest near the Danube, north to the country road the stationed the Bianchi Brigade, South to that the Ludwig cavalry brigade, behind the Bianchi Brigade, on the other bank of the Concó river, at the northwestern edge of Ács, stood the Sartori Brigade, the rest of the Reischach brigade held the Herkály grange. From the IV corps near the Concó river stood the Benedek brigade, and the Herzinger division held the Csém grange. From the III corps the Wolf brigade and the Bechtold cavalry division held Mocsa. The Russian Panyutyin division stationed at Nagy- and Kisigmánd, while the Austrian artillery reserve stood at Újmajor between Nagyigmánd and Ács.

Despite the series of setbacks starting on 16 June, with the Battle of Zsigárd, the morale of the Hungarian army was still positive; the soldiers still believed that Kossuth and his commanders could turn the fate of the war of independence in a positive outcome. Several factors weakened the soldiers' will to fight, thus the chances of winning the forthcoming battle. After the Battle of Pered there was no doubt that the Russians joined the Austrians to crush Hungarian independence. This, in the beginning, seemingly unbelievable truth, contributed to the insecurity of the soldiers, making them open to believing even the most incredible rumors. Also the conflict between Görgei and the political leadership of the country, as well as with a part of the officers, and the news about the plan of the government to depose Görgei from the commandment of the army, putting in his place Lieutenant General Lázár Mészáros, spread also among the soldiers, as well as the fact that they considered the orders, which, unlike before the earlier battles, they were informed not in an encouraging, [...] but in a somber tone, as lacking any chance to end successfully, contributing also to the unrest and insecurity of the soldiers, causing them to have doubts about the chances of success of in the forthcoming battle.

The Hungarian battleplan was that the three Hungarian corps who planned to march away from Komárom towards the concentration point of the Hungarian armies around Szeged (the I., III. and VII. corps), had to attack the imperial army, which was encircling from East and South East the fortress, and to try to reach the Bicske-Győr road at Nagyigmánd, while the II. and VIII. corps appointed to remain in the fortress of Komárom after the aforementioned three corps departed towards Szeged, had to help the attacking troops only with those of their units that were not needed in the defense of the fortress. If they managed to break through the Austrian defense lines, the II. and VIII corps had to retreat to the fortress, while the other three had to continue their march towards Szeged. As main objectives of the battle were: seizing the line of the Concó river, and reaching the main road from Győr to Bicske at Nagyigmánd.

Klapka suspected that after the battle of 2 July, Haynau changed the enemy troops' position, so, to secure a successful attack for the planned attack, he ordered a large scale reconnaissance in force, on 8 July, towards Almás–Mocsa–Igmánd, the Concó creek, Ács, and the Ács forest, to learn more information about the newly built entrenchments, fortifications, and the positions of the enemy forces. But it seems that this plan was not carried out, as it is no record of it in the Hungarian or Austrian military documents, so in the end, the Hungarians would carry out their attack without exactly knowing updated information about the enemy and its exact positioning.

Another bad omen for the outcome of the upcoming attack was that the day of the battle, projected for 9 July, had to be postponed. As seen before, Klapka first set a date of 9 July for the attack but failed to keep it, mainly because of his misunderstanding with Görgei, who forced him to call back the I. corps sent by Klapka towards the Hungarian troops' concentration point from southern Hungary. Despite this Klapka blamed this on the wrong decisions of the military operations office headed by Colonel Bayer, while other sources claim that he himself set a new date to 'lull' the enemy's attention.

The attack had to be carried out not at the same time on the whole frontline, but in stages. It had to start at 7.30 a.m. on the right wing by the VII corps, supported by the Janik division from the VIII. and Rakovszky division from the II. corps, as well as the provisional Pikéthy cavalry division. They had to break through the Austrians through the Ács woods, while the cavalry division had to encircle the woods from the left and push the enemy over the Concó river. The III corps had to attack at 8:00 a.m., bypassing from the left the trenches from Csém, and occupying Nagyigmánd and the main road from Győr to Bicske. Then the I corps had to occupy Mocsa, advance on the road to Tata and to Tömöd, keeping, through detachments the connection with the III corps. Behind the I and III corps, the Görgey-detachment had to be the reserve. The Esterházy division deployed to the left flank had only the task of demonstration. In the case of a successful outcome, the Hungarian headquarters had to be installed in Kisigmánd, where the commandment had to give the new orders to the troops at 8 p.m. Although the plans of the general staff show that they wanted to create a superiority with their troops in one section of the battlefield in order to break through the enemy lines, while the other units of the Hungarian army had to attack the imperial forces on the whole front in order to bind them down and prevent them to help their comrades attacked by the breakthrough force, the battle which ensued showed that no such attempt was implemented.

== Battle ==
As seen before Klapka planned the Hungarian attack for July 11 at 7.30 a.m., but he had to delay it for several hours. Although the original order was that the I corps had to cross the Danube and spend the night in the entrenched camp from the right bank of the Danube, for an unknown reason they crossed the river only the next day in the morning, delaying the start of the battle. According to one of the division commanders, Colonel János Máriássy, the cause of the delay was that during the night Klapka received news about enemy troops' movements, and he had to verify by sending scouts, to what degree these affect the forthcoming attack. But Klapka claims in his memoirs that they had to wait for the ammunition stockpile to arrive, whose delay is caused by the thick fog, followed by rain from that morning. For the troops this long waiting in the foggy, rainy weather had a demoralizing effect. Finally the Hungarian units started to march towards the enemy positions only around 9.00 a.m.

The wounded and still convalescent General Görgei followed the battle with binoculars from the Star Trench (Csillagsánc) of Komárom, as a simple spectator.

The rainy and foggy morning was disadvantageous also for the Austrians because it obstructed them from properly carrying out the reconnaissance of the enemy movements. Also, the slightly undulating terrain south and west of Komárom was appropriate to hide the approaching Hungarians from the Austrian scouts' eyes.

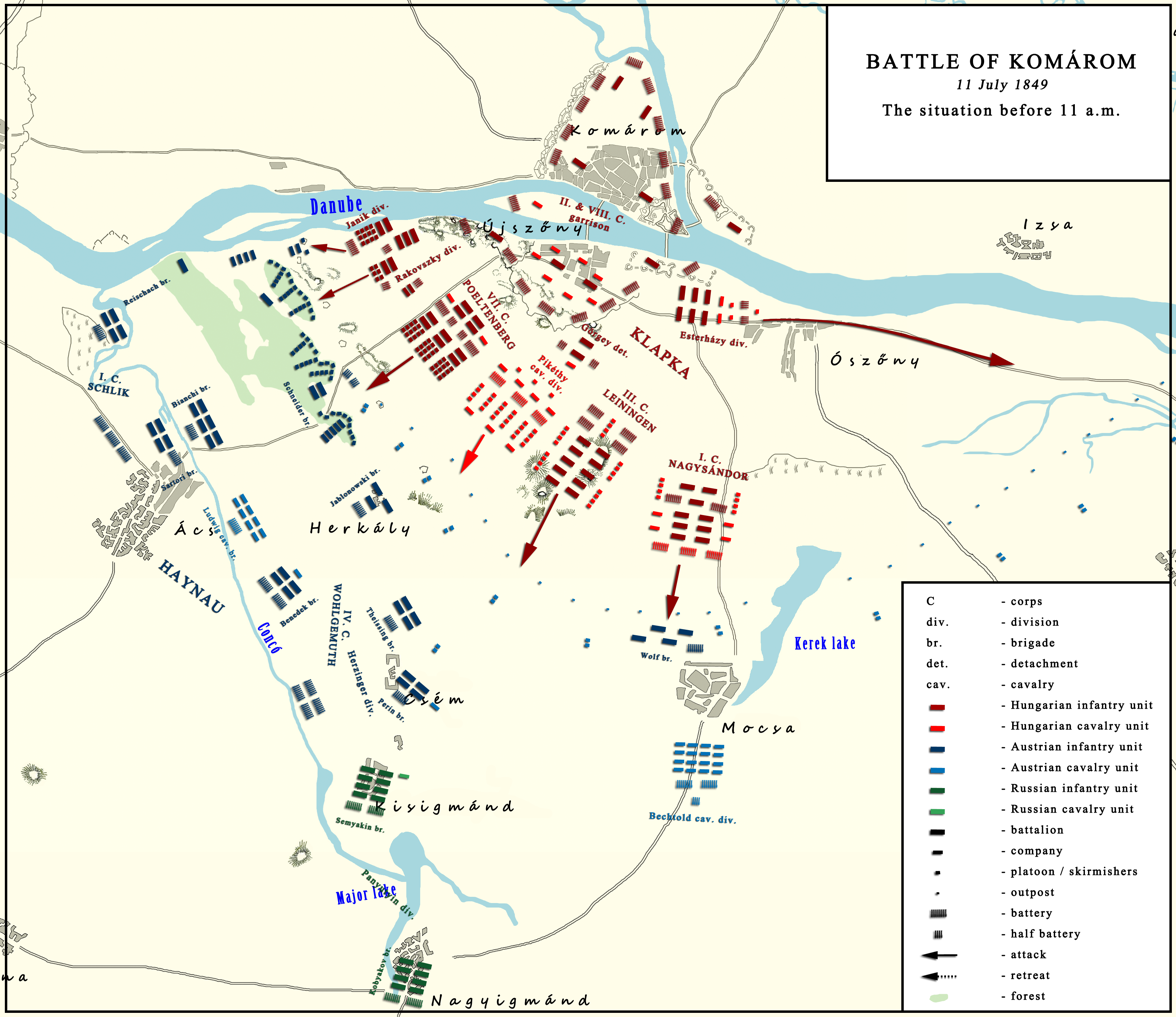
Third battle of Komárom. 11 July 1849. The situation before the battle

The first Hungarian troops who departed towards the battlefield was the I corps, which had to make the greatest distance, then the III corps, followed by the Pikéthy cavalry division, and finally, the VII and VIII corps started to march. According to the battleplan, Pikéthy had to start his attack in an hour, at the latest, around 10 a.m. But the battle started not in the place where it was most needed. The first gunshots were heard East from Ószőny when the Esterházy division saw the enemy troops at the sugar factory from Füzítő. With this the Hungarians failed to use the element of surprise in the areas where it was the most needed, to achieve the much-desired breakthrough. The Hungarians chased away the Austrian vanguards, occupying the place with two guns and one or two battalions, then taking control over the Almás farm. The commander of the Austrian detachment from here Colonel Ottomar Boyneburg-Lengsfeld informed the Austrian commandment about the attack and demanded reinforcements to take Naszály, to prevent the Hungarians advance towards Tata.

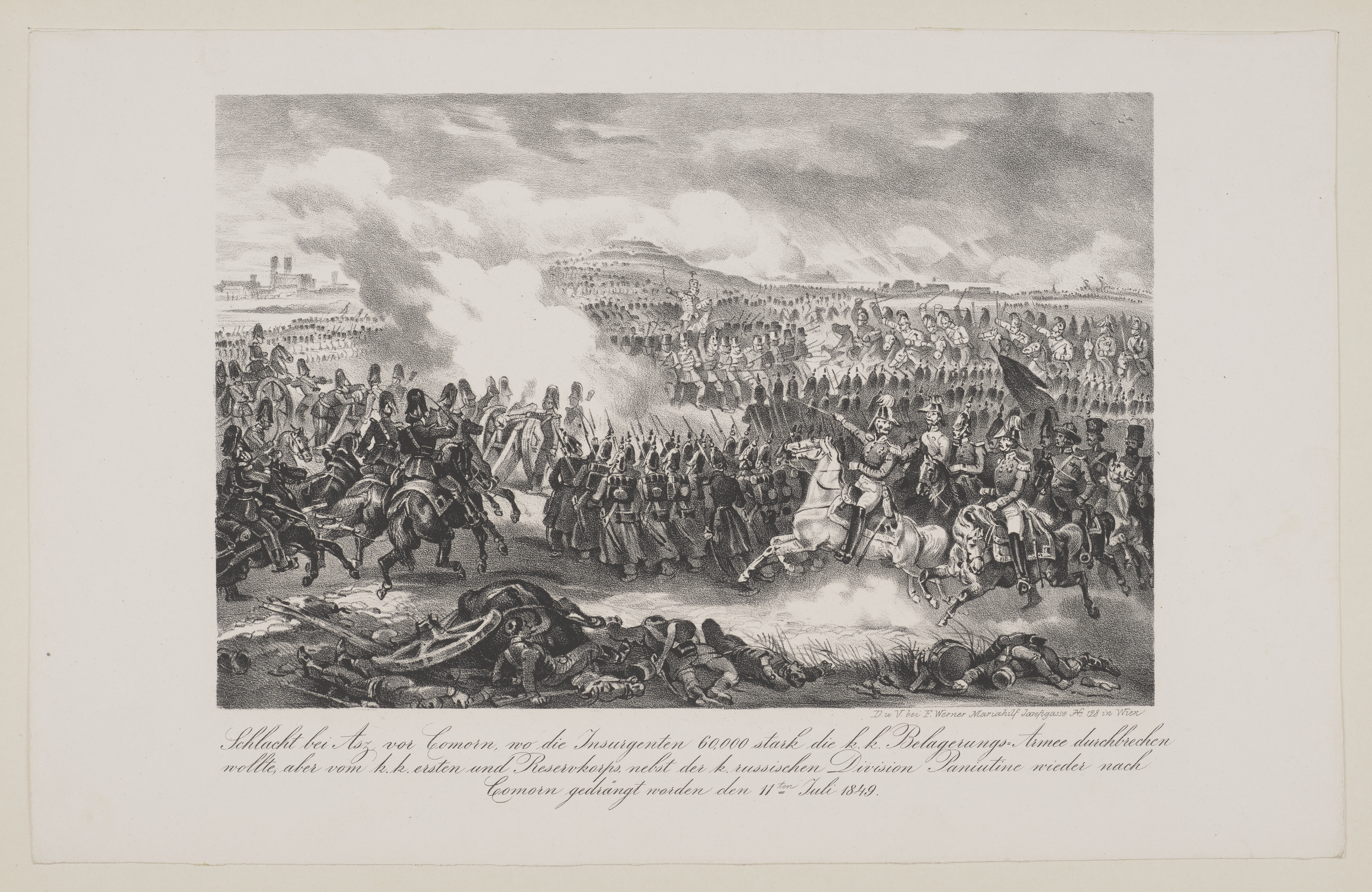
Battle of Komárom at 11 July 1849

The I. corps had to go one mile until Mocsa, which required at least two hours of marching on a partially hilly, partially marshy area, which made their advance more difficult. The cavalry division, led by Colonel István Mesterházy was leading the troops with the Imperial and the Coburg Hussar regiments, followed by the two infantry divisions marching in parallel with each other, between them with the artillery. Although the scouts reported no enemy troops at Mocsak, Major General József Nagysándor ordered his troops to stop halfway, near the vineyards of Ószőny, and to deploy for battle in three infantry lines, sending, according to Colonel János Máriássy an envoy to Klapka, and asking for further orders about what to do next, although he heard from every direction the sound of the cannonade, signaling that the battle started on the whole front. Although during the battle, his troops performed small actions against the enemy outposts which appeared in their vicinity, Nagysándor did not give the order to engage in the battle, and support the Hungarian troops.

In and around Mocsa stationed the Wolf infantry brigade (4 battalions, 1 battery) and the Bechtold cavalry division (23 cavalry companies). The Hungarian advance was reported to them around 11 a.m. by an officer, who observed from the church tower the enemy movements in the direction of Ószőny. After receiving also the report of Colonel Boyneburg, Major General Karl Joseph Franz Freiherr Wolf von Wachtentreu sent an infantry platoon to Naszály. Around noon, when from the direction of Csém and Ács heavy artillery fire was heard, Wolf deployed his brigade in a chessboard formation between the Ószőny road and the Csém grange, 1900 paces west to Mocsa. The position of the brigade was protected by the Szila creek from a cavalry attack. Lieutenant General Philipp Freiherr von Bechtold around 11 o'clock departed with two platoons of the Lederer heavy cavalry brigade, and with the cavalry battery towards Ószőny, to learn more information, then after hearing the cannonade, and receiving the report of Colonel Boyneburg, he deployed his whole cavalry division on the fields near Mocsa. Bechtold positioned the Lederer heavy cavalry brigade right to the Ószőny road, between the road and the Kerek (round) Lake, while the Simbschen light cavalry brigade (with 8 companies) west to Mocsa, left from the already deployed Wolf infantry. After taking the battle order, Bechtold ordered his troops to advance against the Hungarian I. corps, when the Hungarian cannons started to shoot in their direction, as well as on the Wolf brigade, which seemingly remained on their initial position. The Lederer heavy cavalry brigade was the most exposed, thus affected by the cannonballs and grapeshots of the Hungarians, which forced Bechtold to retreat his cavalry in front of the Wolf infantry brigade, which already started, with its artillery, to respond to the Hungarian I. corps artillery cannonade. The artillery of the Bechtold division unlimbered 700 paces from the Hungarian lines and started an artillery duel with them. But in the meantime Haynau sent an order to Bechtold to move with his division towards the Csém grange, so the Lieutenant General sent the Simbschen cavalry brigade towards that location, but because of the Hungarian firing, he could not move the, circa 10 companies of the Lederer heavy cavalry brigade for now. After this the Lederer cavalry brigade and the 6 cannons of the 15. infantry battery of the Wolf brigade tried to do an artillery duel with the 42 cannons of the Hungarian I. corps.

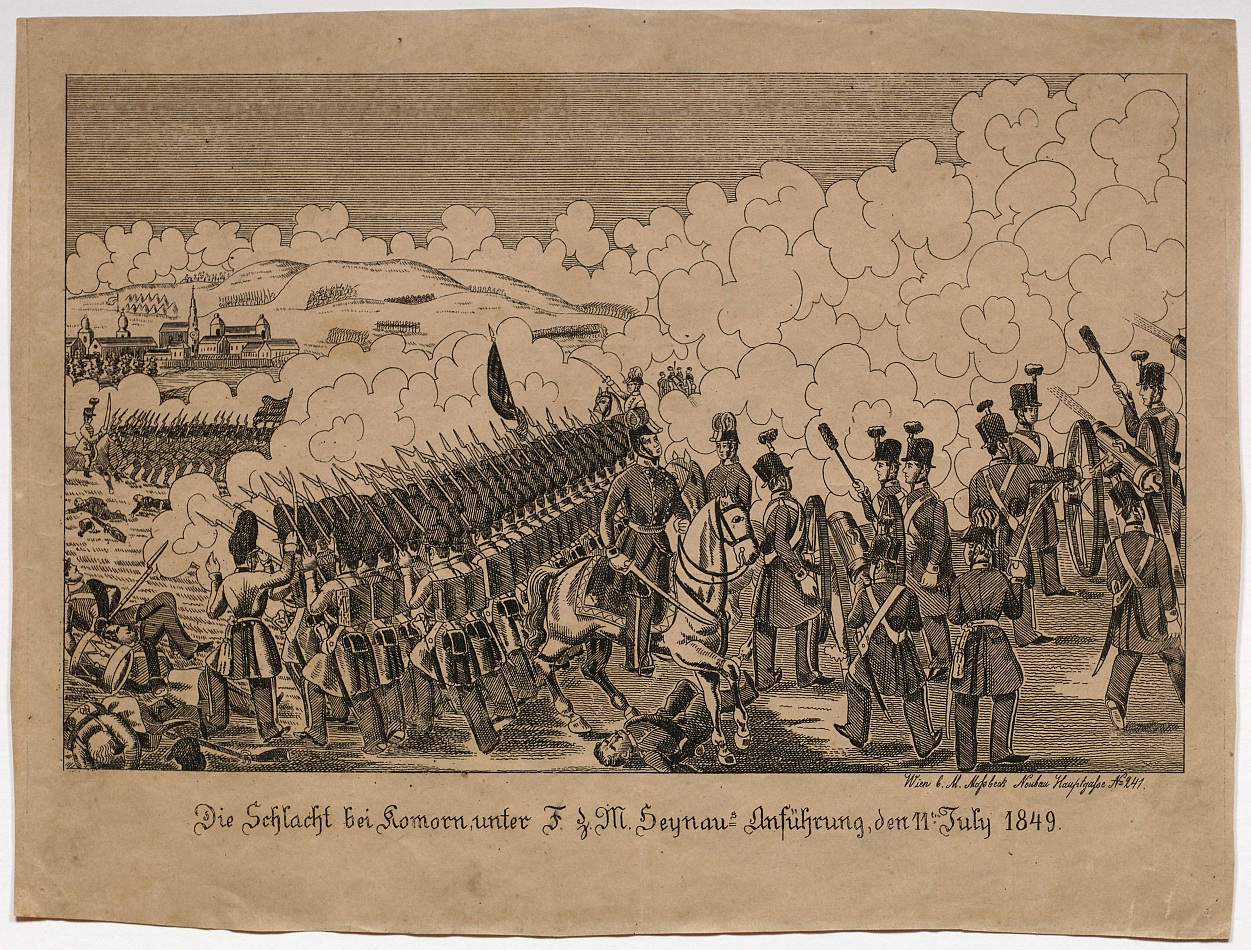
Third battle of Komárom 11 júli 1849

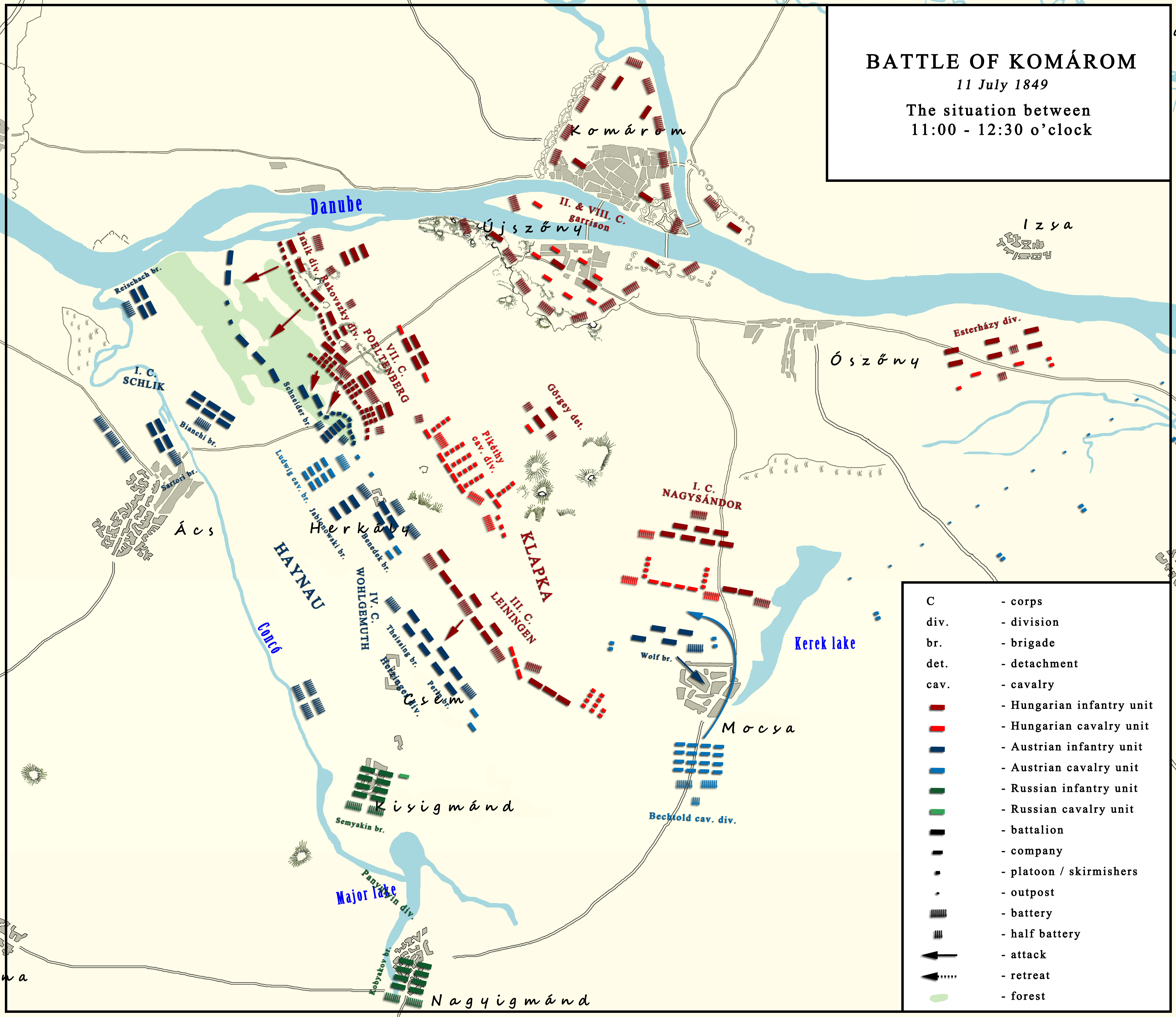
Third battle of Komárom. 11 July 1849. The situation between 11ː00 -12ː30 o'clock

In front of the Herkály farm the Pikéthy cavalry division deployed. General Pikéthy commanded the 2. (Hannover), 4. (Alexander), 9. (Nicholas) hussar regiments and two platoons of the 16. (Károlyi) hussar regiment, and 3 or 4 batteries. Klapka ordered Pikéthy that with these 28 hussar companies to attack the Austrian cavalry which he supposed to be at Herkály, and chase them over the Concó creek, breaking the enemy's battle line in two. At the same time, he had to send units to encircle from the south the Austrian I. corps which was fighting against the Hungarian II. corps attacking from the east, isolating in this way Schlik's corps from the rest of the Austrian army. In case of successfully chasing away the Austrian troops from Herkály from the battlefield towards west, Pikéthy had to return to the Concó, and wait for new orders. The hussar division deployed between the Ács forest and the Herkály grange, installed its artillery, and despite finding numerically inferior enemy troops there, did not attack, confined itself to shooting at the Austrian troops from the forest and the Herkály farm. In order to help these troops Lieutenant General Wohlgemuth, commander of the Reserve (IV.) corps, ordered the Herzinger division from his IV. corps to attack Pikéthy's batteries from left, but right when the division was preparing to attack the heights North to the Csém grange, they were attacked from the right by the III Hungarian corps led by General Leiningen.

The Csém grange represented an important strategic point in the Hungarian battle plan because they knew that the Austrians fortified it and packed it with many soldiers. The divisions of the Austrian Reserve Corps in the morning of 11 July were in their camp near the Csém and Herkály granges, their outposts observing the roads coming from the fortress of Komárom, and the directions from which a Hungarian attack could come. The Herzinger division which was guarding Csém was one of the elite units of Haynau's army, consisting of the Theissing brigade with the Schneider, Fischer, Richter & Bittermann grenadier battalions; the Perin brigade with the Braida, Koudelka, Pásztory, and Trenk grenadier brigades; and with the 18. and 19. infantry battalions. Haynau had confidence in them and warned of the danger of a Hungarian attack, ordering them to fortify the Csém grange and pay special attention to the area between Csém and Mocsa. Sensing the importance of the semicircular defense lines from Csém, Haynau moved the Russian Panyutyin division closer: on a height west from Kisigmánd to, and to leave only 2 battalions to defend Nagyigmánd. The Theissing brigade deployed left from the Csém grange parallel with the road heading to Ács, and reaching the heights southeast from the Herkály grange. The Fischer grenadier battalion from the left of the brigade connected to the Benedek brigade, positioning themselves behind the Karl chevau-légers platoon from the right wing of the Benedek brigade. The Rainer grenadier platoon of the Fischer battalion served as an outpost, forming a skirmish line between Csém grange and the Benedek brigade, protecting also the artillery of the brigade and the 18. six-pounder infantry battalion deployed behind it. The position of the other battalions of the Theissing brigade is less known, but probably the Bittermann battalion, in column formation, occupied the center, having on its right Schneider battalion, and as right the flank the Richter battalion.

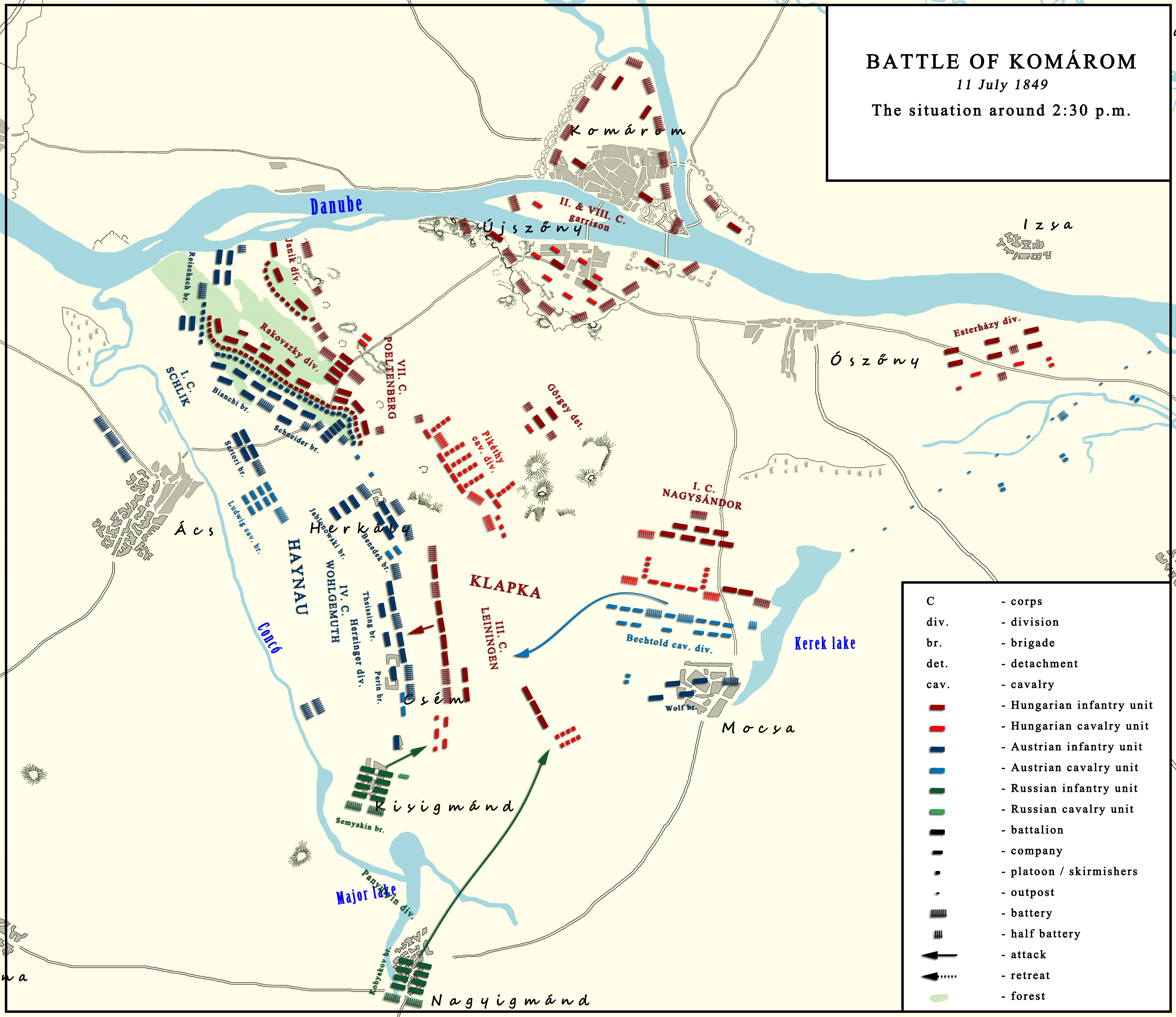
Third battle of Komárom. 11 July 1849. The situation around 2ː30 p.m

From the Perin brigade, first, the Braida battalion arrived from the encampment to the Csém farm. A platoon of them took a position at the sheepfold, a company was placed behind the stonewall of the church, while another was in a trench dug earlier by the soldiers. Half of the 19. infantry battalion (3 cannons) positioned itself right from Csém, while a company of the battalion, and part of the Nassau infantry regiment occupied the burnt house near the cemetery. The other 5 companies remained in a tight column and took position near the other half of the 19. infantry battery positioned left from the road to Ács. The Trenk battalion formed the right wing of the brigade, the Pásztory battalion the center positioned in Csém, while the Koudelka battalion formed the left wing of the brigade. One platoon of the Koudelka battalion was designed to be the vanguard.

When Field Marshall Haynau received the news about the Hungarian shootings around 11:30, ordered the reserve (IV) corps led by Lieutenant General Ludwig von Wohlgemuth to occupy the heights from the Herkály grange, and the Russian division commanded by Lieutenant General Feodor Sergeyevich Panyutyin to march towards Csémpuszta (Csém grange). Around 12:30 Haynau arrived at Herkály heights, to take up the command. When he arrived there the fight did not start yet, only the artillery duel from the direction of Herkály was on in full force. In order to relieve the Hungarian pressure on the Benedek brigade, Haynau ordered the Herzinger division to turn around with its right wing towards the left, and threaten the Hungarian batteries with encirclement. When he received the report about the Hungarian advancement, he ordered the Herzinger brigade to deploy in front of Csém, stretching with its left flank towards Herkály, and called the Panyutyin division to deploy on the right flank of the Herzinger division.

The position of the Herzinger division was not very favorable, because the high cornfield in front of them obstructed their view. Their position was flanked from left by the Benedek brigade, positioned favorably on a height, but from the right, there were no troops to protect their side. In order to resolve this problem, Wohlgemuth sent 4 companies of the Karl chevau-léger regiment to the right of the Herzinger regiment. The battle formation of the Herzinger division was made of a single line, the brigades being next to each other, mostly in columns. The fortified Csém grange was behind them. But right when the Herzinger division started to accomplish Haynau's order, mentioned above, to turn around, according to the Austrian report, the brigade from their right was attacked by a couple of Hungarian battalions, through the cornfield which hid their presence until then.

According to the initial plan the III. corps had to start their march at 8 a.m., from the earth fortification at the road towards Igmánd. But because of the delay of the I. corps, the III. corps too departed much later, after 10 a.m. According to the plan Leiningen's corps had to keep the connection from the left with the I. corps which advanced to Mocsa, and from the right with the Pikéthy division, which was heading towards the Herkály farm. About the Hungarian III. corps' units positions during the march there are no sources. Probably the cavalry division of the corps was divided between Leiningen's troops attacking Csém and Pikéthy's cavalry division which had to attack the Herkály grange.

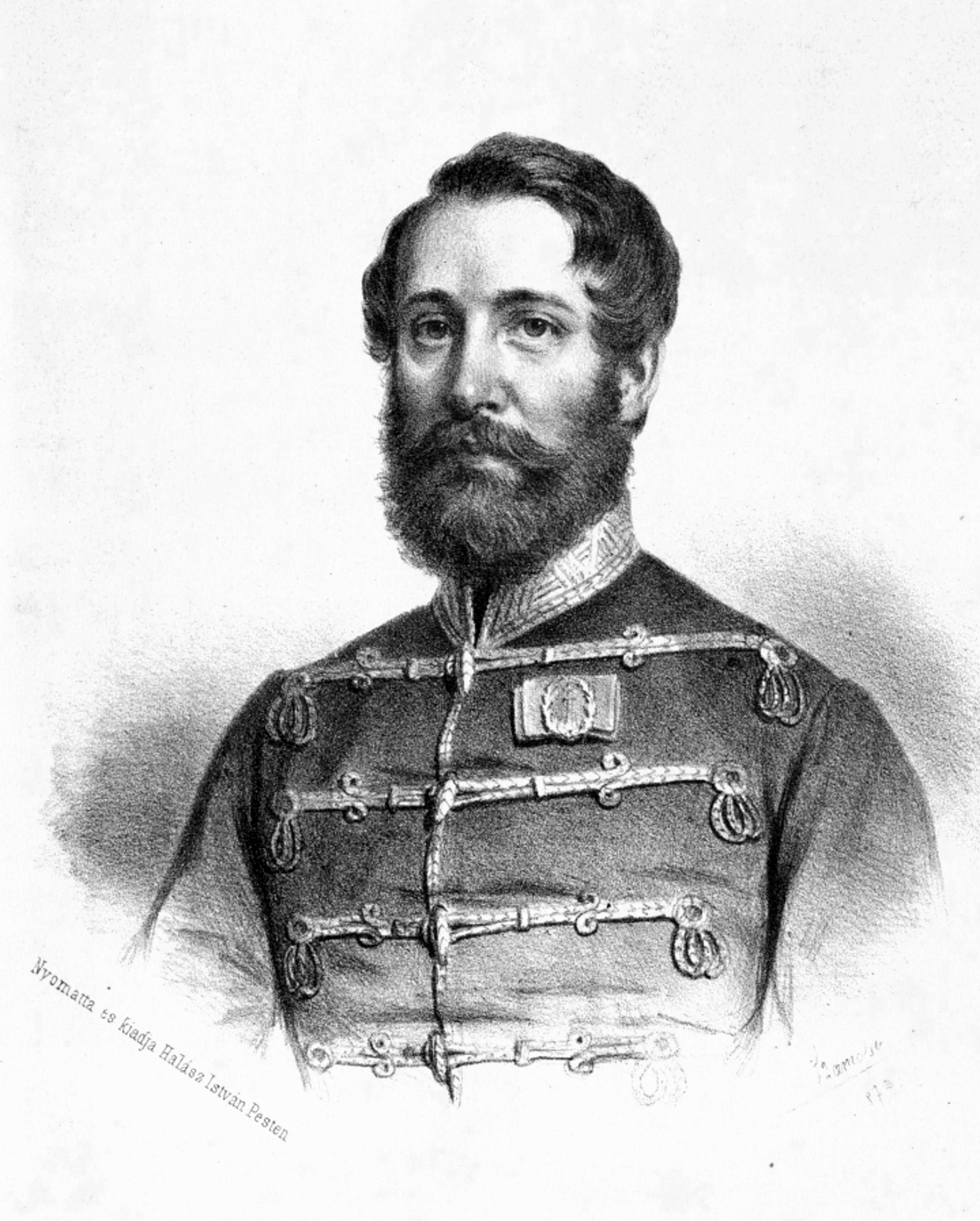
Leiningen-Westerburg Károly Szamossy

The Hungarians probably knew that the Herzinger brigade made earth fortifications around the grange, and deepened the ditches along the road to be suitable for an effective defense. Leiningen knew that if he wanted to succeed, his troops had to go around the farm from the right, and attack it from the side and the back. If they succeeded in this, after occupying the Csém grange, they could fulfill their strategic objective: to reach the Bábolna road. The vanguard of the cavalry of the Hungarian III. corps started its fight around 11:30 with the vanguard of the Karl chevau-légers, forcing them to retreat. After this, the Hungarian cavalry fully deployed, and their batteries prepared to fire. After this the hussars tried to reach the eastern side of the Csém grange, towards the supposed right wing of the enemy. According to the report of the Austrian Reserve (IV.) Corps and Haynau's documents, the Austrian outposts from Csém were forced to retreat by two Hussar platoons and 16 cannons, while 3 Hungarian batteries deployed on the heights next to Komárom, and helped the Hussars to develop their attack. Meanwhile, also the infantry of the Hungarian III. corps started to advance. The Hungarian infantry battalions reached the cornfield and pushed out through a bayonet charge the Austrian infantry, which retreated into another cornfield, but the Hungarians' charge pushed them out from there too. When they came out from this cornfield, they found there the Herzinger division right when they were turning around, and, as mentioned above, attacked their right wing. The Perin brigade was caught by the surprise attack of the Hungarian infantry, and also the hussars menaced them from the right wing. The Pásztory battalion tried to help the Perin brigade, by forming a skirmish line and attacking the Hungarians. Major Imre Pásztory sent also half of the infantry battery forwards to counter the Hungarian battery. The counterattack, launched with a platoon by the imperial major of Hungarian origin, succeeded to stop the enemy's attack, but the attack of another Hungarian unit threatened Pásztory with defeat, but the intervention of the Trenk grenadier battalion temporarily resolved the dangerous situation. When the hussar platoons came to help the infantry, they were repulsed by the grapeshot of the Austrian guns. But the Hungarian infantry of the III. corps regrouped and attacked again with 5-6 battalions, threatening the Austrian grenadiers with splitting, so first the 19. infantry battery, then the Trenk, Pásztory, and Koudelka battalions retreated behind the aforementioned ditch near the road toward Ács. With the retreat of the Austrian grenadiers, the Hungarian troops of the III. corps directly threatened the Csém grange, and at the same time menaced Haynau's army to encircle its right wing. (Note: Furthermore, Klapka in his memories claims that Leiningen's corps even captured the Csém grange, but the Austrian sources do not confirm this, which makes this claim unlikely.) Leiningen tried to encircle the Austrian right wing with his hussar platoons, which was unsuccessful, but nevertheless, they managed to push the Austrian chevau-légers inside the Csém farm. It seems that this quick success surprised even Leiningen and Klapka, because they did not send more battalions and batteries to strengthen their position.

If at this moment Pikéthy would have ordered an attack, the whole left flank of the Austrian army would have been in great danger, but he did nothing. General József Nagysándor, commanding the I Hungarian corps, remained at the Ószőny vineyards, continuing the artillery duel with the Bechtold cavalry division of the I Austrian corps, instead of advancing level with the III corps of Leiningen, exploiting Herzinger's rout. Nagysándor, despite the urging of his division commanders (Colonel Máriássy and Colonel Bobich), refused to go in offensive, even after Bechtold, obeying Haynau's urgent command, finally moved with the Lederer cavalry light brigade towards Csém, leaving the Wolf brigade alone (who as a result of this, retreated in Mocsa), against the whole Hungarian corps. Nagysándor decided to attack, only when it was too late, at the end of the battle, right before he received Klapka's order to retreat. General Klapka, as the commander of the Hungarian army also bears responsibility for Nagysándor's inactivity, because, despite being only 2–3 km distance from him, he did not try to see what his corps commander is doing, or to send him an order to attack.

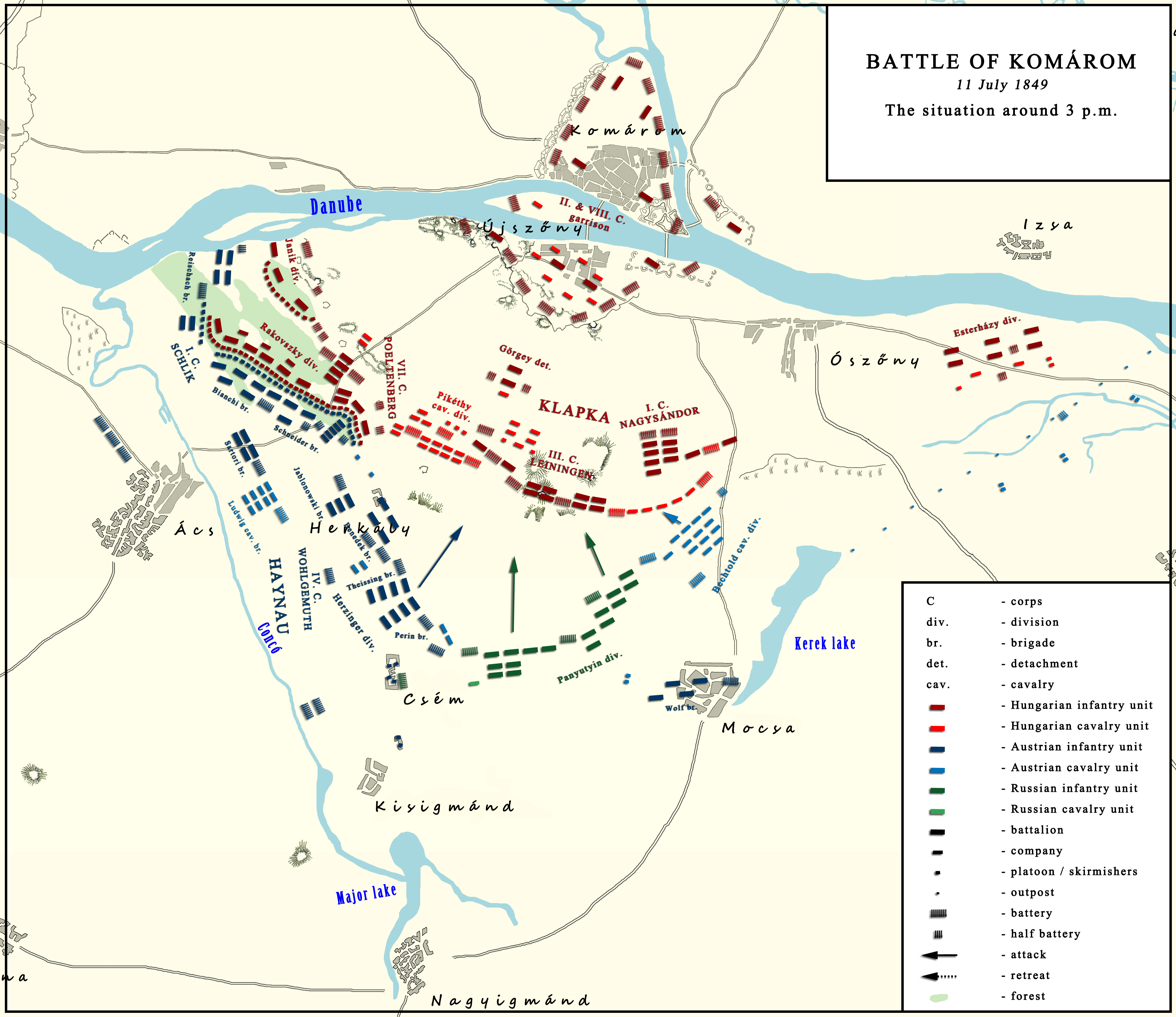
Third battle of Komárom. 11 July 1849. The situation around 3 p.m

Unlike the Pikéthy and Nagysándor, Haynau was much more active, trying to resolve this grave danger for his army, organizing the Reserve corps's right flank to hold the defensive positions in and around Csém, and sending the 18. Congreve rocket- and the 10. twelve-pounder battery to reinforce them. The presence of these batteries created the conditions to start a counterattack. The inactivity of the I. corps gave time to Herzinger to reorganize his troops between the Herkály and the Csém grange, and led by Wohlgemuth in person, they counterattacked. Leiningen too led his troops personally against the Herzinger division, but the devastating fire of the concentrated batteries of the IV. corps put them in disorder, so the Hungarian III corps retreated. The Hungarian main commander of this battle, General Klapka ordered his reserve batteries to advance to the III corps, and respond to Wohlgemuth's guns, so a harsh artillery duel started with the participation of 140 cannons, which lasted an hour, giving to Leiningen time to reorganize his infantry.

During these fights, the danger of a Hungarian encirclement still persisted. This was averted only by the appearance of the Russian division. First the 17th jäger regiment of Bryansk and the 7yj light battery appeared from the direction of Kisigmánd at the Csém grange, right at the moment when the Hungarians were attacking the farm. The Russians could deploy their troops undetected on the Hungarians' side because a scrubland and a hill concealed them. Colonel Konstantin Romanovich Semyakin approached with his troops at 500 paces of the Hungarian left wing and suddenly ordered fire. Despite this surprise, the Hungarians were not shaken but attacked the Russians with 2 battalions and 8 cannons. The Russian infantry formed squares and started to shoot at the attackers, while the Russian cannons shot grapeshots at them, which forced the Hungarians to retreat. Soon after that the other jäger regiment (owned by Ivan Paskevich) of the Panyutyin division arrived, together with the 8. light battery, while behind them another two regiments with a heavy and a light battery deployed as reserves. Despite this, the Hungarians did not lose courage, and the hussars recklessly tried to encircle the Russian troops, but the grapeshots of the 7. and 8. Russian batteries repulsed them. The hugely outnumbered Hungarian III. corps (aside from the Herzinger division, the Russian division solely had 5000 soldiers and 8 cannons more than them) tried again to attack with its cavalry, but the Russian artillery repulsed them again.

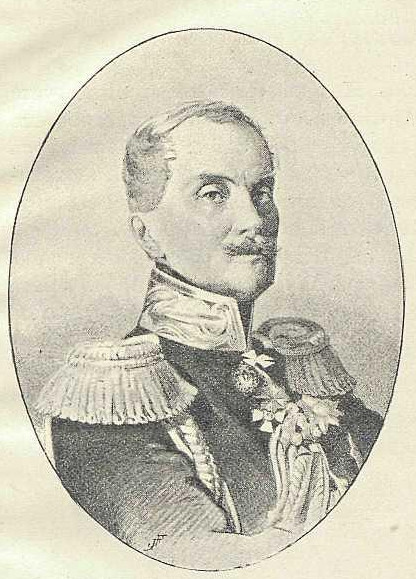
Fedor Sergeyevich Panyutin

The growing enemy resistance forced the III. corps to regroup and reorganize. Now the artillery took over the main role in the fighting. The two infantry brigades of the Austrians from Csém to Herkály had 2 batteries, but they brought as reinforcements another 2 batteries from the artillery reserve, shooting at the Hungarians with 24 cannons, while the Russians had 48 cannons. On the other side the two infantry divisions and one cavalry division of the Hungarian III. corps had in total around 34 cannons. They could reduce this difference with the use of the 8 launching racks of the only Congreve rocket battery of the Hungarian artillery reserve. The long artillery duel lasted an hour and caused important losses to both armies, but the Hungarians were those who were pressured by the time. But either the Pikéthy division nor the I. corps did not appear to support the III. corps. It seems that Klapka either did not send them any order to attack.

Seeing that the much awaited support from the I. corps or Pikéthy's division had not appeared, but still wanting to win the battle, Leiningen ordered another attack against Csém, this time with all his reserves. He himself led the attack heroically in the sultry heat and occasional showers. According to some accounts Klapka too was at the head of the attacking troops, but Klapka's memoirs contradict this. Leiningen with his troops advanced until the first houses of the Csém grange, some accounts (Wilhelm Rüstow) even writing that they even occupied it, but this is unlikely. Leiningen, who advanced too much - 1000 paces within the enemy fire range - hoped that Nagysándor's I. corps will finally appear on the flank or behind the Csém grange.

This was the moment when the right flank of the Panyutyin's Russian division positioned around the Csém grange, and the Simbschen brigade from the Bechtold division, positioned at the right wing of the Russians, attacked the too-advanced Hungarian III corps, threatening it with encirclement. Leiningen resisted this attack for a while, but seeing that the danger of being outflanked by the right wing of the Russians and Simbschen's brigade, is imminent, he finally ordered the retreat, which, in the beginning, was done in order, but when his troops were hit by the enemy artillery from three sides, his lines almost fell in disorder, being saved from a rout by the fact that the Russians renounced to the pursuit. So Leiningen had time to reorganize his troops again. According to historian Tamás Csikány the Hungarian rout actually did happen, started by the 3. battalion of the 19. infantry regiment, which run into the advancing troops, creating panic among them, only the famous 9. "Red Hatted" battalion retreating in order, until Leiningen reorganized his corps behind some heights. During this assault and retreat the Hungarians had huge losses. For example, the 65. battalion lost 14 officers and each company lost around 20-30 soldiers.

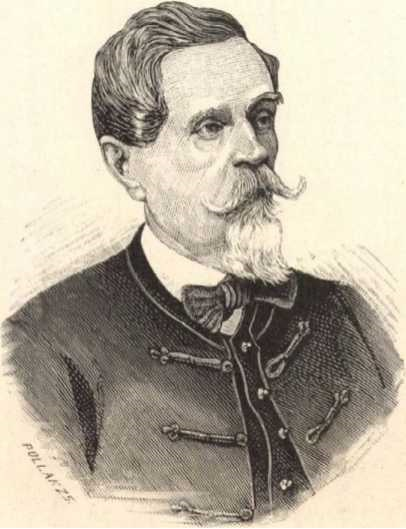
Pikéthy Gusztáv 1890

Meanwhile, the Pikéthy cavalry division, starting, according to the report of General Felix Jablonowski with 11 o'clock, probably in coordination with the artillery of the VII. corps, was shooting the Austrian troops around Herkály, instead of attacking with the cavalry. Although the hussars had to attack through a 1 km. long open area between the Herkály grange and the southern edge of the Ács forest, which could represent a danger of suffering great losses if the Austrian artillery or cavalry would have attacked them, but in the case of a success, would have contributed in a decisive way to a Hungarian victory. Pikéthy had around 2 hours to attack with his cavalry before important Austrian forces arrived there. The Ludwig brigade which duty was to protect the area between the southern edge of the Ács forest and the Herkály grange was only called to occupy their position around 12:30 o'clock. But Pikéthy did not give the order to attack. The cause of this could have been the renal colic of which he was suffering that day, being unable to move in the saddle because of the pain. But if he would have handed over the lead of his cavalry to one of his daring hussar officers, the outcome of the battle could have been different. Before the battle the Austrian Jablonowski brigade of the Reserve corps's Lobkowitz division was fulfilling vanguard duties, while the other brigade of the Lobkowitz division, the Benedek brigade was positioned at a distance behind Herkály.

Before 11 o'clock Jablonowski sent three companies of the 1. battalion of the Nassau infantry regiment to the southern edge of the Ács forest. The other battalions of the brigade guarded the Herkály grange and the hill southeast from it. When the Pikéthy division arrived, the Benedek brigade was also alerted. After he verified the reality of the news about the Hungarian attack by sending an officer to Herkály, after a quarter hour he sent his brigade in two columns towards Herkály. When he arrived the buildings of the farm were already burning because of the artillery fire of the Hungarians, and the Jablonowski brigade suffered so heavy losses, that they had to be replaced. After this the Benedek brigade took battle position on the hill right from the grange. After this Jablonowski sent two companies of the Nassau infantry regiment in the southern edge of the Ács forest, to reinforce the Austrian troops from there, while the rest of his troops were retreated in reserve. The whearabout of his batteries are unknown: he could have retreated them as well, or they remained to support the batteries of the Benedek brigade, which started a harsh artillery duel with Pikéthy's batteries.

As mentioned above, the Ludwigh cavalry brigade was alerted about the Hungarian attack only around 12:30. General Ludwig first sent two companies to reinforce his outposts and to confirm the news, then he deployed his brigade between the Herkály farm and the southern edge of the Ács forest. The 2. cavalry battery supported two chevau léger regiments, while 2 of its cannons were sent to reinforce the Austrian troops from the Ács forest, while the other 4 cannons of the battery were sent to reinforce the Herkály farm. The 6 cannons fought, for hours, a harsh artillery duel with the Hungarian guns. But the cannons of the Pikéthy division were so efficient that Ludwigh had to pull his cannons a little back. Seeing that the Hungarian artillery could win the duel, the commander of the Austrian I. corps, Lieutenant General Schlik sent the 5. twelve-pounder battery from the artillery reserve. This battery took position near the southern edge of the forest, shooting at the Hungarians in coordination with the cavalry battery of the Ludwigh brigade. The artillery of the Benedek brigade was also reinforced with the 9. twelve-pounder battery from the artillery reserve. Despite these reinforcements, the Austrian artillery suffered important losses in men and horses. An exploding grenade scared even the favorite horse of General Ludwig von Benedek, which threw down its rider and stepped on his belly. Luckily Benedek escaped with minor injuries. At the 20. cavalry battery an ammunition wagon exploded, and due to the intense firing, the 5. twelve-pounder battery almost ran out of ammunition, forcing them to shoot at a slower rate. But on the other side, the Hungarians completely run out of ammunition, which made the hussars suffer heavily from the enemy shootings, to which their guns could not respond anymore. Despite this concentrated cannonade from two directions against them, the hussar regiments did not waver but even tried smaller scale attack, which helped them to keep their positions. But nevertheless, because of Pikéthy's inactivity, and refusal to send them to attack the Herkály grange and the line of the Concó creek when it was the possibility to take them, their heroism did not pay off in the result of the battle.

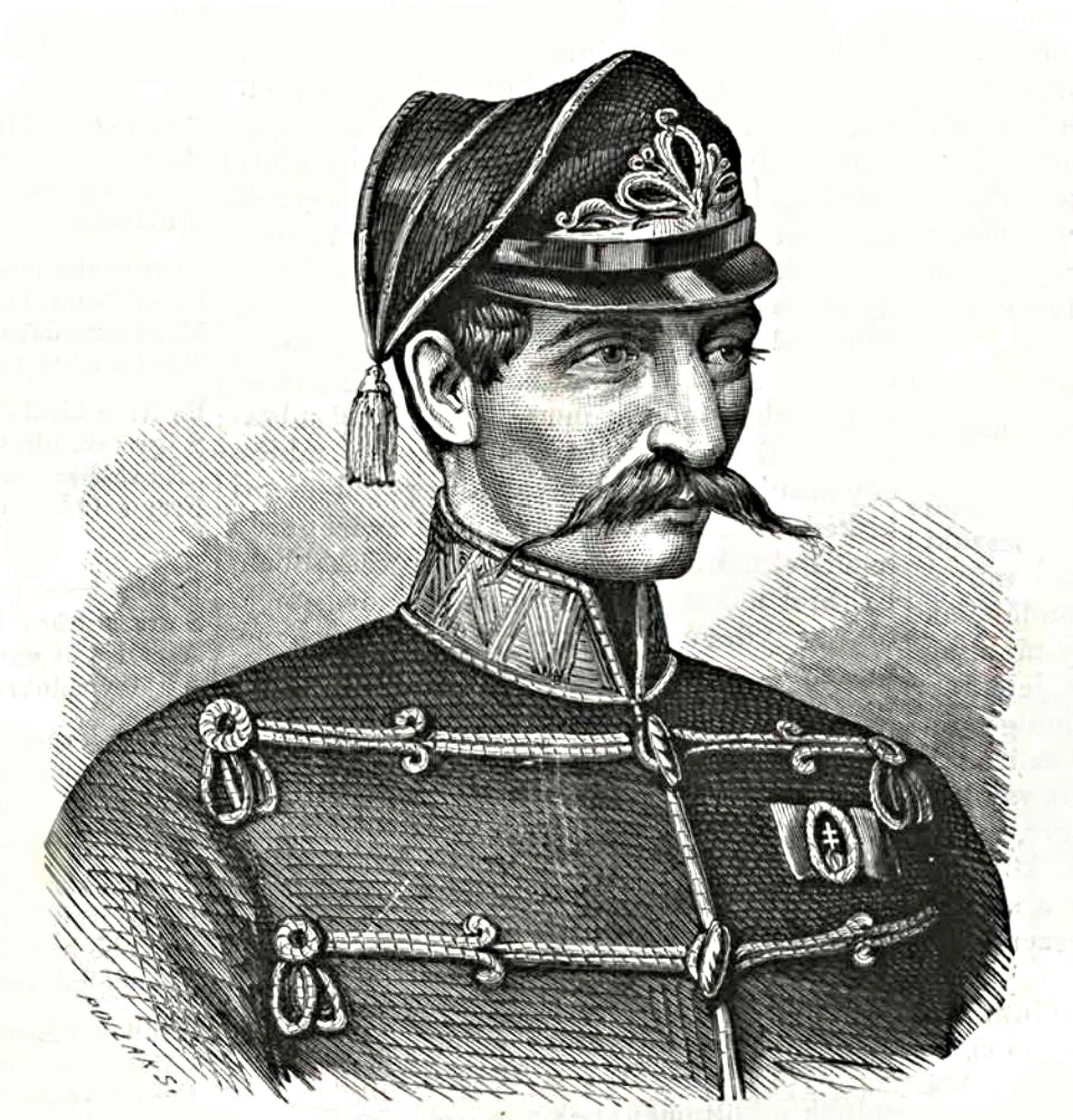
Poeltenberg Ernő

When the I. and III. corps, together with the Pikéthy division attacked the Austrians at Ószőny, Mocsa, Csém, and Herkály, the Ács forest was attacked by the VIII. corps's Janik division and the II. corps's Rakovszky (former Kászonyi) division led by Colonel Ferenc Aschermann, as well as units from the VII. corps led by General Ernő Poeltenberg. Two divisions of the Hungarian VIII. corps led by Ferenc Aschermann advanced through the vineyards from Szőny and then to Lovad towards the Meggyfa-erdő (Cherry Forrest), at the same time the VII corps led by General Ernő Poeltenberg entered in the Ács woods. These troops representing the Hungarian right flank, departed with considerable delay, in the same way as the rest of the army. The Janik and Rakovszky (Kászonyi) divisions attacked through the so-called Cherry Forrest (Meggyfaerdő), while Poeltenberg attacked south from them, on the Ács road.

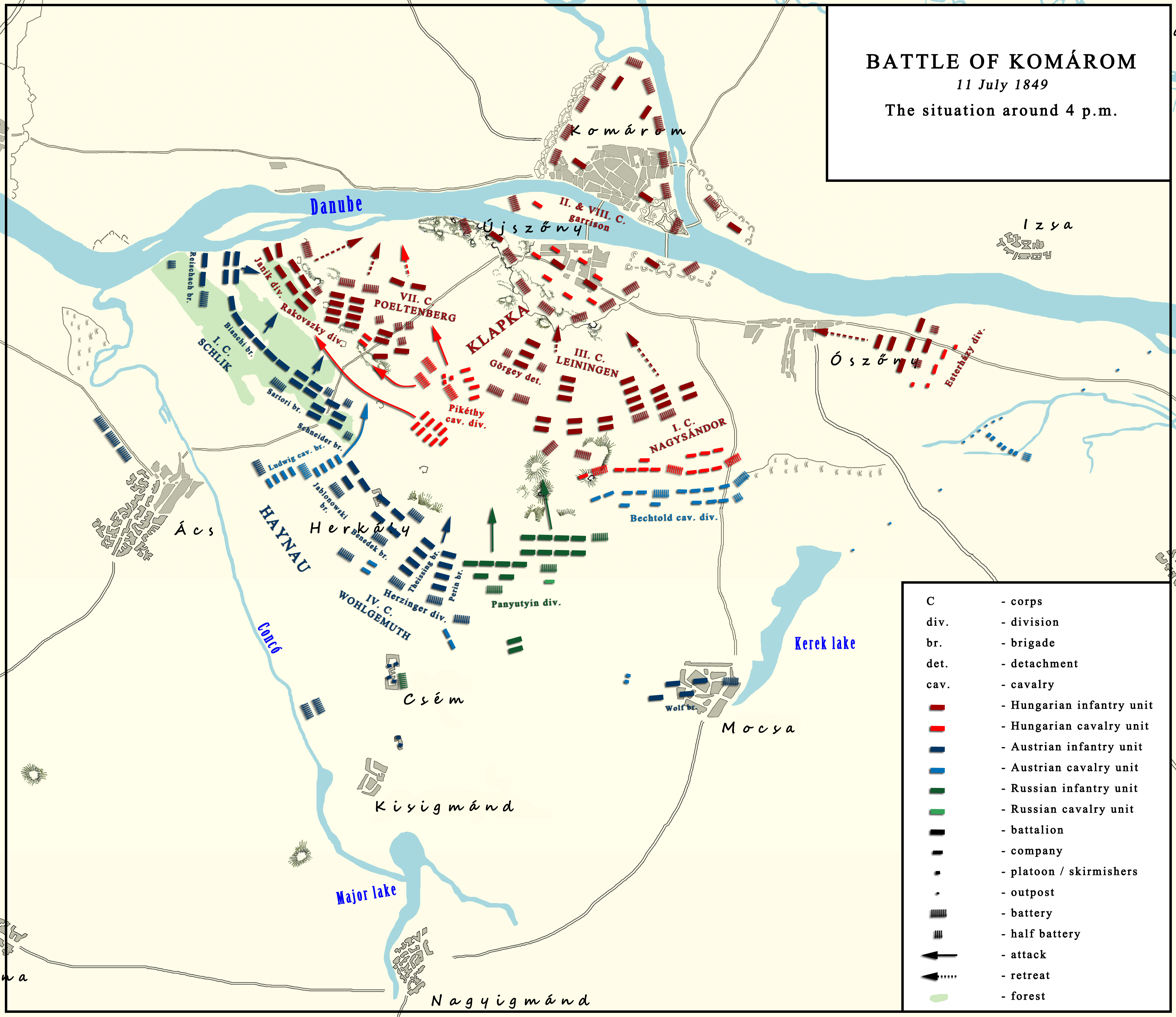
Third battle of Komárom. 11 July 1849. The situation around 4 p.m

In the morning of 11 July, the Ács forest was held by the battalions of the reinforced Schneider brigade, which were designed as outposts, as well as two battalions of the Reischach brigade. Around 10 a.m., these troops took their positions in the sketchy trenches on the forest's eastern edge. The Hungarian attack, which started at 12:30, took by surprise the Austrians, who, although they heard the gunshots coming from the direction of Herkály, they thought that it was only a fake attack, like those performed in the days before. Colonel Janik wrote in his memories that his attack, carried out on the extreme right flank, drove out the enemy from the Meggyfa forest and much of the Ács forest, capturing also 2 of their cannons. The enemy was pushed to the western edge of the Ács forest According to Colonel Schneider, the attacking enemy troops were 12 battalions and were composed partly of territorial militias, with a couple of three-pounder guns. He wrote that in the forest fight against the numerically superior Hungarians, the Austrian battle line broke in several points, and the Austrian troops from the center and from the portion of the forest near to the Danube, were pushed back to the wooden barricades and trenches positioned at the western edge of the Ács forest. But this attack, probably carried out only by the vanguard of the attacking troops, could not hold this position, because here the Schneider brigade reorganized its troops, and with the reinforcements which arrived there, pushed them back with a bayonet charge and with the support of the infantry and artillery positioned in the trenches between the forest and the locality of Ács. With this counterattack the Schneider brigade took back the trenches from the eastern edge of the forest. But here the Hungarians counterattacked with fresh troops and 4 batteries, pushing back again the Austrians to the trenches and barricades from the western edge of the forest, causing heavy losses to the imperials, and dispersing almost completely the Austrian 3. battalion of the Hess infantry regiment. But the Hungarians could not bring with them their batteries, and during the fight they used all their cartridges, so when they arrived to the western edge of the forest, they were hit very hard by the Austrian artillery and infantry, reinforced by the Bianchi, Reischach and Sartori brigades. The Bianchi brigade deployed in the western edge of the forest, the Reischach brigade was brought from the western bank of the Concó creek, while the Sartori brigade was kept in reserve on the hills in front of Ács. The Reischach brigade advanced in the northern side of the wood to a clearing, where they met the Hungarian battalions, which were holding two earthworks. Reischach gave order to his soldiers to deliver a volley and his artillery to fire grape shots at the attacking Hungarians, and sent one of his battalions to encircle them. The Hungarians resisted with great losses, but when the encircling Austrian battalion appeared, they retreated in disorder until the vineyards near the Monostor fort, where Lieutenant Colonel Rakovszky tried to reorganize them. After sending the artillery to help the III corps, Klapka went to the right flank, and witnessed the retreat of the Hungarian troops from the forest.

The Schneider, Reischach, and Bianchi brigades pushed again the Hungarians out of the Ács forest. But, at Klapka's order, the Hungarians went on the attack again. Schlik in his report writes that the Hungarian officers frightened and fanaticized their soldiers, and sent them to attack the center and the southern part of the forest. The Hungarian soldier Rafael Dékány in his memoirs wrote that Lieutenant Colonel Rakovszky asked them if they want to take back the forest, and the soldiers responded affirmatively but complained that they have no cartridges left, so the Lieutenant colonel personally took care of this problem, procuring them ammunition, then the soldiers being accompanied by the kind and inspiring sounds of the Rákóczi March, departed again joyfully as if they were going to a wedding, and forced again the Austrians to retreat from the forest. But the Austrians attacked again, and the Hungarians were pushed out of the forest for the third time. But not the Hungarian soldiers of the II. and the VIII. corps, nor their officers were to blame for this defeat but Pikéthy, whom they expected to attack from the south but remained totally inactive. If the cavalry division would have attacked from the south, the direction of Herkály, Schlik would have been forced to divide his forces and protect his side. In this case Aschermann's and Poeltenberg's troops would have had much more chances to win. Despite this the brave soldiers of the II. and VIII. corps attacked the forest also for the fourth time, but now they were too tired because of the continuous fighting, nevertheless, they remained in front of the forest, entering a shooting duel with the Austrians.

The most crucial moments of the battle were around 2:30 p.m. when the Hungarians held the Ács forest and were close to taking the Csém grange. But due to the inactivity of the I. corps and the Pikéthy division and the counterattack of the Austrian and Russian troops, there remained no chance of success. The historian Zoltán Babucs points out that the intervention of the Russian division was the turning point of the battle. Seeing that his troops could not break through the Austrian lines, and not wanted his troops to suffer more meaningless losses, which could affect the fighting power of his army in future battles, Klapka ordered his army to retreat. He decided to start the retreat, so ordered the artillery positioned on the heights before the Ács and Cherry forests, to cover with its fire the retreat of his troops.

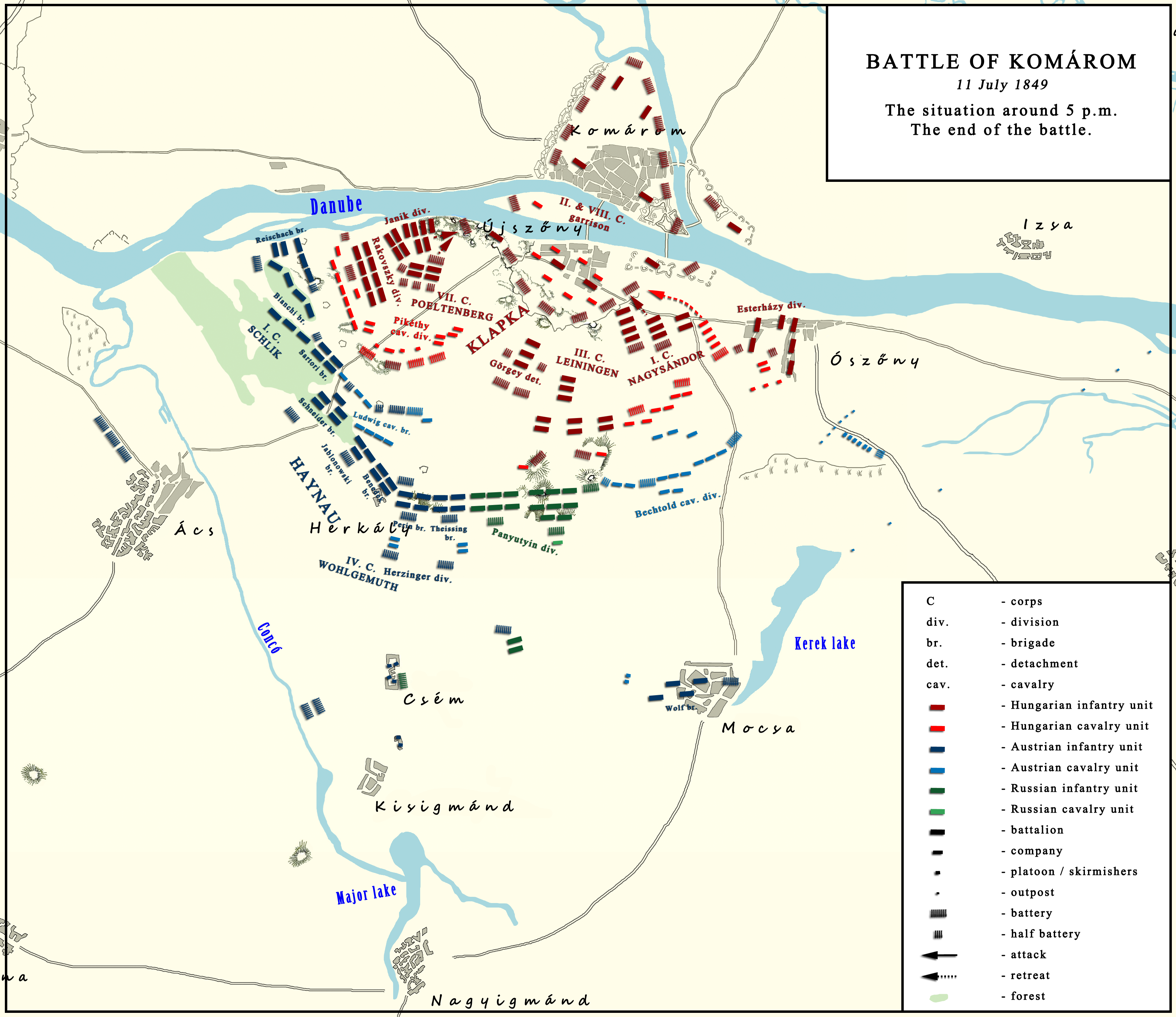
Third battle of Komárom. 11 July 1849. The situation around 5 p.m. The end of the battle

The Austrians started their counter-attack at Csém, after the last attack of Leiningen's III. corps failed and retreated to reorganize their units. In the counter-attack took part the Herzinger division of the IV. (Reserve) corps, the Panyutyin division, and the Bechtold cavalry division. Although Haynau affirms that the Herzinger division started the attack before the Russians arrived, it is more plausible his other affirmation that the counter-attack started after all these troops took up the battle formation, and attacked gradually, starting from their right wing. The Herzinger grenadier division attacked from the direction of Csém, the Russian division joined them from the right, while the Simbschen cavalry brigade, coming from the direction of Mocsa joined the attack on the right flank of the Panyutyin division. Because the I. corps of Nagysándor did not move from Mocsa, the left flank of Leiningen was unprotected and could be surrounded by the enemy. This is why Haynau ordered the Simbschen cavalry brigade to deploy on the Russians right flank, and attack Leiningen's troops from the left, joined by the Panyutyin and finally by the Herzinger division. When he came through the high cornfield from Mocsa, Simbschen ordered his cavalrymen to dismount and walk by their horses, in order to rest them on the rugged terrain before the attack. When the brigade neared 1000 paces from the Russians, Simbschen saw the Hungarians retreating, so he gave the order to attack.

Leiningen retreated the III. corps in order, slowing the enemy's advance by deploying his artillery on the hills. Then they meet with the retreating I. corps, which have not done almost anything in the battle, and now they could repel, with joined forces the attacks of the pursuing Austrian cavalry brigade. During the retreat the I. corps being on the left flank, was affected the most by the attacks of the Austrian cavalry. The hussars did not engage fully against the superior enemy but tried to deal with them in cooperation with the infantry and artillery. They first entered in battle with the Austrian cavalry, then retreated, luring them near to the infantry which shot volleys at the enemy, then the hussars, reinforced by their reserves counter-attacked. This stratagem was repeated two times, causing important losses to the Austrian cavalry. Emil Zámbory, the captain of the Ferdinand hussar regiment wrote in his memories that General Leiningen gathered hussar platoons from the Ferdinand, Hannover, Imperial, Coburg, and Hunyadi hussar regiments to form a hussar mass to defend the left flank attacked by the Lederer heavy cavalry brigade. (Note: Zámbory in his memory writes that they were Imperial Uhlans, but Tamás Csikány argues that the Simbschen brigade could not attack because of the deploying Hungarian artillery, and the more and more marshy terrain from the vicinity of the Hungarian encampment. Simbschen tried to pursue the Hungarians only with his battery, and the other two batteries sent by Haynau.) The hussars attacked the heavy cavalry brigade from the front and both sides, while two of the Coburg hussar platoons, under the leadership of major Imre Új, attacked them from behind. At the same hussars split, and behind them, the battery of captain Ignác Németh came out and fired grapeshots on the Austrian cavalry. Seeing the failure of the Lederer brigade, General Karl von Simbschen sent a half battery and an uhlan platoon to support them.

According to Haynau the attack of the Lederer brigade reinforced with the uhlans sent by Simbschen was successful against the, according to his opinion, 7 hussar platoons. The Austrian cavalry attacked in echelon formation, and forced the hussars to retreat. The hussars retreated in disorder within the cannons’ range of the fortress of Komárom. According to the Austrian high commander, in its last attack the Austrian cavalry attacked two infantry masses, two hussar platoons, and a battery, but these retreated inside the fortress cannons' range, where the Austrian riders did not follow them. Although Haynau affirms that the Russian division arrived there only after the pursuit ended, Panyutyin's report states that their 4. heavy battery participated in the pursuit, repulsing a hussar attack with grapeshots.

After this the Hungarian I. corps, and the Esterházy division positioned between Ószőny and Dunaalmás, retreated, being covered by the cavalries of the III. and the I. corps, repelling the attacks of the Bechtold cavalry division.

On the Hungarian right flank, some sources (for example Bódog Bátori-Sulcz) say that the Hungarian units of the II. corps led by Colonel Ferenc Aschermann retreated in order, while others (Major Szillányi) present it as a total disorder and panic, routing under the firing of the Austrian artillery. According to Szillányi only a half twelve-pounder battery and a couple of companies of the Württemberg hussars, which covered the retreat kept their order and repelled the pursuing units, although they too suffered great losses from the firing of the Austrian kaiserjägers. The VII. corps of Ernő Poeltenberg retreated in order, as well as the Pikéthy division, which repulsed, through the Nicholas hussars, the attack of an uhlan company.

The Austrian and Russian troops did not follow the Hungarians when they reached the firing range of the cannons of the fortress of Komárom.

At 5.00 p.m. all the Hungarian units were behind the entrenchments of Komárom.

After the battle, the Austrian army retreated and took positions as follows: the I. corps led by General Franz Schlik in the Cherry and Ács forests, the Jablonowski brigade left of the Herkály grange, the Benedek brigade and the Herzinger division right of it, to their right being the Panyutyin division, right to them the Bechtold cavalry division, finally, the Wolff brigade remained at Mocsa.

According to Wilhelm Rüstow the Austrians had 7 officers and 116 soldiers dead, 24 officers and 559 soldiers wounded, and 1 officer and 80 soldiers missing. The Russians lost 1 soldier dead and 25 soldiers were wounded. The Hungarians had, according to the Swiss historian, around 1500 losses.

== The causes of the Hungarian defeat ==
The defeat from 11 July had multiple causes. Even the purpose of the battle was contradictory.

Many military historians criticized the Hungarian battleplan, saying that its errors, as well as the missed opportunities of the Hungarian army caused their defeat. Klapka's battleplan was criticized by the Swiss military historian Wilhelm Rüstow, who in his book Geschichte des ungarischen Revolutionskrieges in den Jahren 1848 und 1849 pointed that a successful attack against well defended and fortified enemy lines could be successful only by achieving a numerical superiority at one point of the battlefield, and trying to break through in that pplace, while Klapka, whose troops were numerical inferior on the whole of the battlefield, did not even tried to concentrate the bulk of his troops in such a point; instead of this he scattered his corps on a wide battle line, attacking with them in multiple directions, thus trying the decisive attack with insufficient number of soldiers right in the most fortified place, where the most enemy soldiers were waiting (i.e. the Ács woods, where the Austrian numerical superiority was more than 4–1), while at the places where only weak Austrian detachments were present (i.e. Dunaalmás), an entire Hungarian division remained inactive without attacking. Another place which offered a chance of success in the case of a Hungarian attack would have been between the mail road from Ács and the main road to Igmánd, where the Hungarians should have concentrate 32 000 - 34 000 soldiers, and with this force they could have broken through the Austrian right wing, and achieved victory. Instead of this Klapka divided his troops equally on the battlefield.

Major General Klapka's plan shows that he did not have adequate reconnaissance intelligence reports or did not assess them correctly. According to the historian Tamás Csikány, by sending the Austrian 3rd Army Corps towards Pest, Haynau offered the opportunity to Klapka to encircle his army. The strength and position of the I Hungarian Corps made it possible to chase away the weaker Austrian troops from Mocsa, to attack the Austrian garrisons from Csém and Igmánd from the side, and to support the attack of III Corps. From Mocsa the I Corps would have had to march approximately 8 kilometres. The use of reserves and the using of a cavalry detachment would have given Klapka a significant advantage, thus an important chance of successfully ending the battle. Csikány also points that on the left bank of the Danube the Austrian II. Corps was also isolated, almost defenseless, in Csallóköz with a very fragile connection to the bulk of the army across the Danube. From 2 July onwards, the Hungarian army had more than a week to defeat this corps, creating an absolute superiority there. But this was not even attempted. Faced with the two brigades of the Austrian corps, the II. and VIII. Corps were left with at least half of their forces on the left bank of the Danube - in total passivity. Csikány points as the main cause of this defeat was Klapka himself, otherwise a capable general, who elaborated many successful operational plans, for example the plan of the Spring Campaign. Csikány suspects that the cause that this good strategist made these mistakes, was that he accepted to lead his troops in this battle unwillingly, only because he was ordered to do so, and perhaps his only serious purpose in it was to save the army from greater losses, before he sent them towards Szeged. Although he led the battle, conforming to the wish of Görgei, he did not wanted to take risks, which prevented his army to profit from the opportunities of a victory offered by Haynau's mistakes.

As it was shown before, Klapka did not lead with the necessary vigor his uncertain and passive generals (Nagysándor and Pikéthy), although to achieve a victory in such a battle all the units had to carry out their tasks with the maximum determination and strength. Tamás Csikány believes that Klapka was unsure about the purpose of this battle, but he did not want to oppose Kossuth's and Görgei's plan, and did not want to lose many soldiers either in this battle.

Lieutenant Ferenc Karsa, an adjutant of the Upper Danube Army, wrote about Klapka: I believe that he lost the battle of 11th because of the easy slackening of his willpower, and because his hesitation gave the enemy 8 whole days to organize his troops and to engage the Muscovite army corps (sic.).

Görgei wanted to break through the Austrian troops towards the west, then, conform to Kossuth's expectations, to retreat with the Hungarian army towards the south-east towards the Tisza river. But for this, he had to cross the Danube with his troops. Haynau would follow him, and when he tried to cross the Danube on the pontoon bridge from Paks, the Austrians could easily push the Hungarians into the river. Or Haynau could join Paskevich Russian troops at Pest, and then together attack the retreating Görgei. If the battle would have ended as it was planned, this plan enforced by Kossuth could easily bring a crushing catastrophe for the Hungarian armies. Maybe this is the cause as to why the Hungarians did not plan and execute this battle with all the attention and devotion required for such an important task. Maybe this is the cause why although the concept of this battle was to break through the enemy's lines, the Hungarian attack was carried out like a general attack against the enemy.

There were errors also on the Austrian side: the leader of the Austrian cavalry division Lieutenand General Philip Bechtold, despite Haynau's orders to attack the Hungarians with full determination, failed to fulfill this order. But nevertheless Haynau achieved the victory he needed: he prevented the Hungarians breach attempt, forcing Görgei to leave Komárom on the left (Northern) banks of the Danube, enabling himself to reach the Hungarian capitals before the Hungarians, and to block their way towards South East to the Hungarian armies gathering point around Szeged, as it was planned by Kossuth.

== Aftermath ==
The battle of Komárom from 11 July was the last chance of the Hungarian army to defeat the main Austrian army led by Haynau before the Russian army of Field Marshall Ivan Paskevich. Görgei had to content himself with the victory from 2 July, but without crushing Haynau's army, as he planned.

This battle was among the most cherished Austrian victories by the emperor Franz Joseph I of Austria, who commanded two paintings for his workroom, depicting his troops victories in Hungary: one was about the Battle of Temesvár from 9 August 1849, the decisive victory of Austrians, the other showed the Battle from Komárom from 11 July.

After the July 11 Battle of Komárom, in accordance with the decisions of the ministry council from 5 July, and the military council from 6 July, Görgei directed his troops along the left bank of the Danube in the direction of Vác on July 12 and 13. Görgei had at his disposal the I., III., and VII. corps and the column of Ármin Görgey, in total around 27 000 men (35 infantry battalions, 45 cavalry companies, and 140 cannons). At 7.00 p.m. the column of Ármin Görgey left the first the fortress, then at 9 the I. corps, while the III. and the VII. corps left Komárom after midnight. In the Komárom fortress remained the II. and the VIII. corps, with around 19,000 soldiers, under the command of General György Klapka.

== See also ==
- First Battle of Komárom (1849)
- Second Battle of Komárom (1849)
- Fourth Battle of Komárom (1849)

== Sources ==
- Babucs, Zoltán (2017), "A harmadik komáromi csata (The Third battle of Komárom)", felvidék.ma 11 July 2017
- Bánlaky, József (2001). A magyar nemzet hadtörténelme (The Military History of the Hungarian Nation) (in Hungarian). Budapest: Arcanum Adatbázis.
- Bona, Gábor (1996). Az 1848–1849-es szabadságharc története ("The history of the Hungarian War of Independence of 1848–1849) (in Hungarian). Budapest. ISBN 963-8218-20-7.
- Bóna, Gábor (1987). Tábornokok és törzstisztek a szabadságharcban 1848–49 ("Generals and Staff Officers in the War of Independence 1848–1849") (in Hungarian). Budapest: Zrínyi Katonai Kiadó. p. 430. ISBN 963-326-343-3.
- Csikány, Tamás (2015). A szabadságharc hadművészete 1848-1849 ("The Military Art of the Freedom War 1848–1849") (in Hungarian). Budapest: Zrínyi Katonai Kiadó. p. 382. ISBN 978-963-327-647-1.
- Csikány, Tamás (2013), "Egy céltalan haditerv - Komárom 1849 július 11" (PDF), Hadtörténelmi közlemények
- Hermann, Róbert (2001). Az 1848–1849-es szabadságharc hadtörténete ("Military History of the Hungarian War of Independence of 1848–1849") (in Hungarian). Budapest: Korona Kiadó. p. 424. ISBN 963-9376-21-3.
- Hermann, Róbert (2004). Az 1848–1849-es szabadságharc nagy csatái ("Great battles of the Hungarian War of Independence of 1848–1849") (in Hungarian). Budapest: Zrínyi. p. 408. ISBN 963-327-367-6.
- Pusztaszeri, László (1984). Görgey Artúr a szabadságharcban ("Artúr Görgey in the War of Independence") (in Hungarian). Budapest: Magvető Könyvkiadó. p. 784. ISBN 963-14-0194-4.
- Rüstow, Friedrich Wilhelm (1866). Az 1848-1849-diki magyar hadjárat története, II. kötet ("The History of the Hungarian Campaign from 1848-1849, vol. 2.) (in Hungarian). Pest: Emich Gusztáv.
