= Franz Schlik =

Franz Joseph von Schlik of Bassano and Weisskirchen
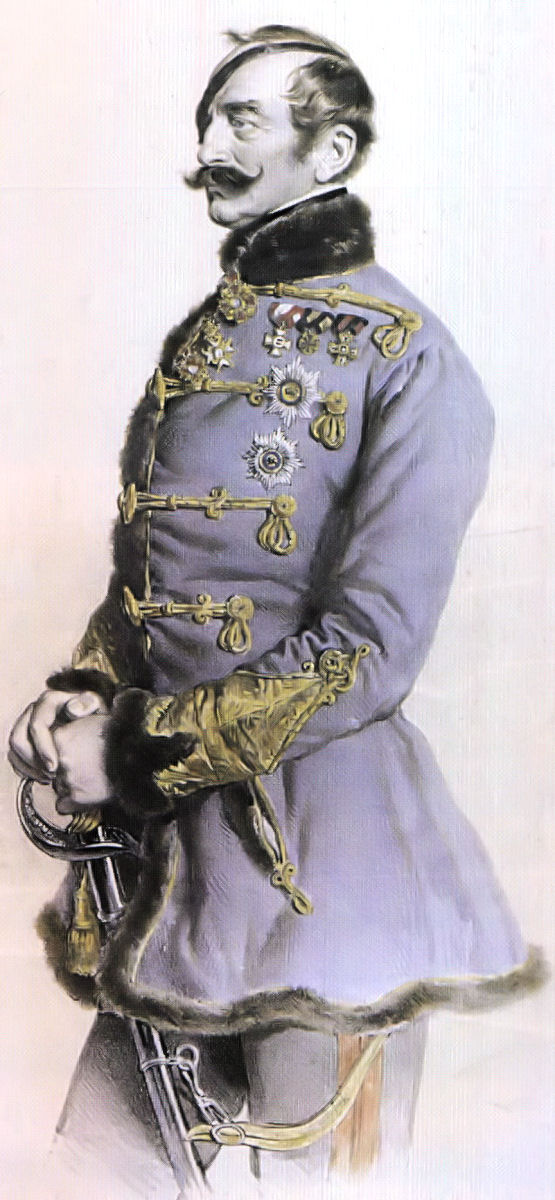
- 1849 lithograph
- Born: 23 May 1789; Prague, Kingdom of Bohemia, Holy Roman Empire
- Died: 17 March 1862 (aged 72); Vienna, Austrian Empire
- Military career
- Allegiance: Austrian Empire
- Branch: Army (Cavalry)
- Rank: General
- Battles: See list: Battle of Budamér (1848) Battle of Kassa (1848) Battle of Szikszó (1848) Battle of Tarcal (1849) Battle of Bodrogkeresztúr (1849) Battle of Tokaj (1849) Battle of Kápolna (1849) Spring Campaign of the Hungarian Revolution of 1848 Battle of Isaszeg (1849) Second Battle of Komárom (1849) Third Battle of Komárom (1849) Summer Campaign of the Hungarian Revolution of 1848 Battle of Győr (1849) Battle of Szőreg (1849) Battle of Solferino (1859)
- Awards: Austrian Order of the Iron Crown (1849); Military Order of Maria Theresa (1849)

Franz Joseph von Schlik of Bassano and Weisskirchen (23 May 1789 – 17 March 1862) was a count and general in the Austrian Empire. He was one of the most successful Austrian generals during the Hungarian Revolution of 1848.

== Early life ==
Joseph was born as the son of Count Joseph Heinrich Schlick of Bassano and Weisskirchen and his wife, Countess Philippine Ludmilla of Nostitz-Rieneck.

In 1808, he enrolled in the imperial army and fought in the Napoleonic Wars. He lost sight in his right eye in the Battle of Leipzig on 19 October 1813. In 1848, as a Lieutenant general, he became regent of Kraków in Poland.

== Hungarian Revolution ==
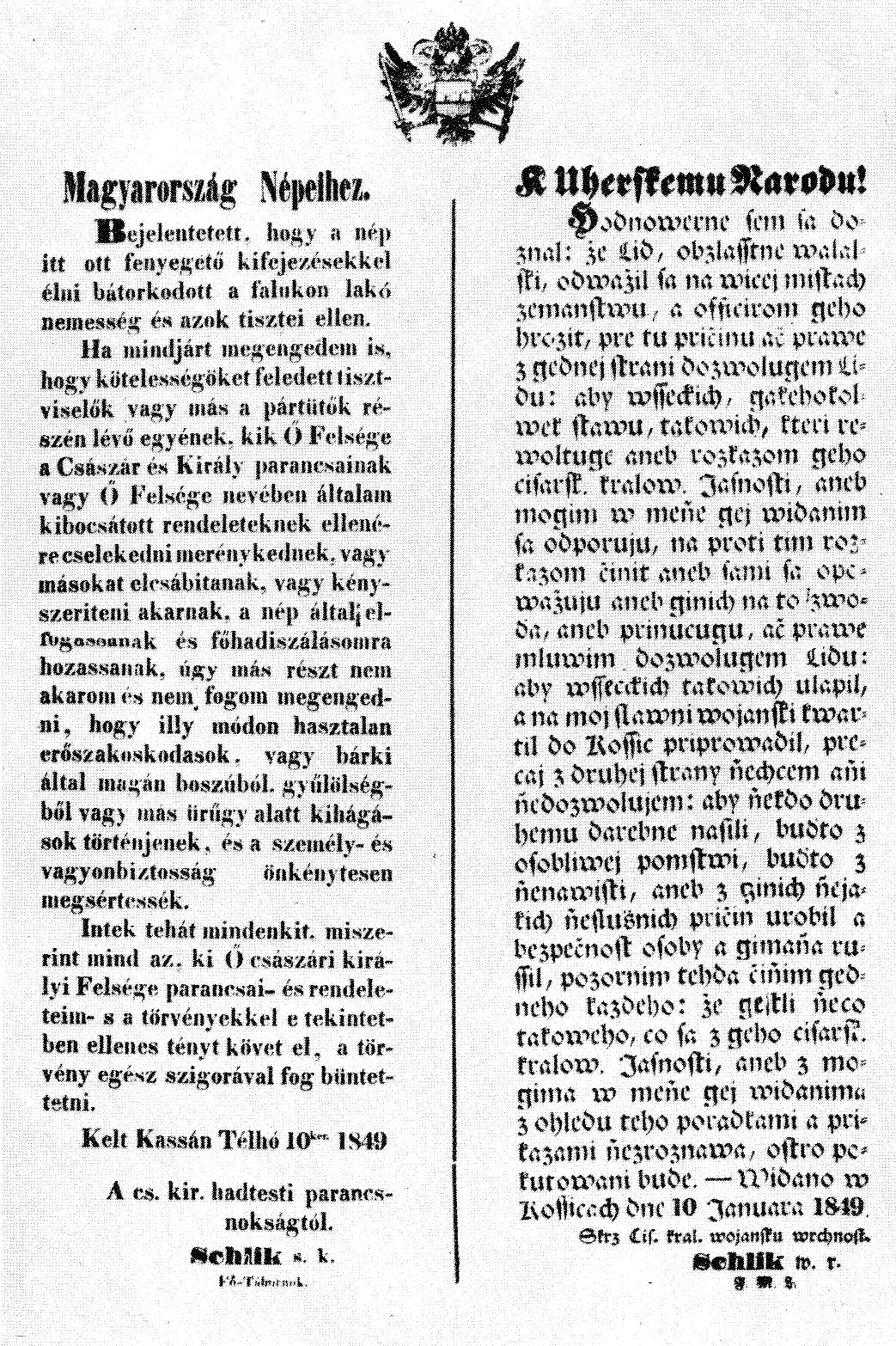
Schlik's proclamation to the peoples of Hungary (in Hungarian and Slovak)

In late 1848, Schlik led a legion of 8,000 men through the Dukla Pass into the Kingdom of Hungary before Alfred I, Prince of Windisch-Grätz started to attack Hungary in the Winter Campaign of the Hungarian Revolution of 1848. On 11 December Schlik defeated Sándor Pulszky in the Battle of Budamér and occupied Eperjes (now Prešov, Slovakia) and Kassa (now Košice, Slovakia).

His victories were a warning to the Hungarian Military Commission who recruited approximately 10,000 men around Miskolc under Lázár Mészáros's command, but Schlik defeated him on 28 December 1848 in the Battle of Szikszó and on 4 January 1849 in Kassa.

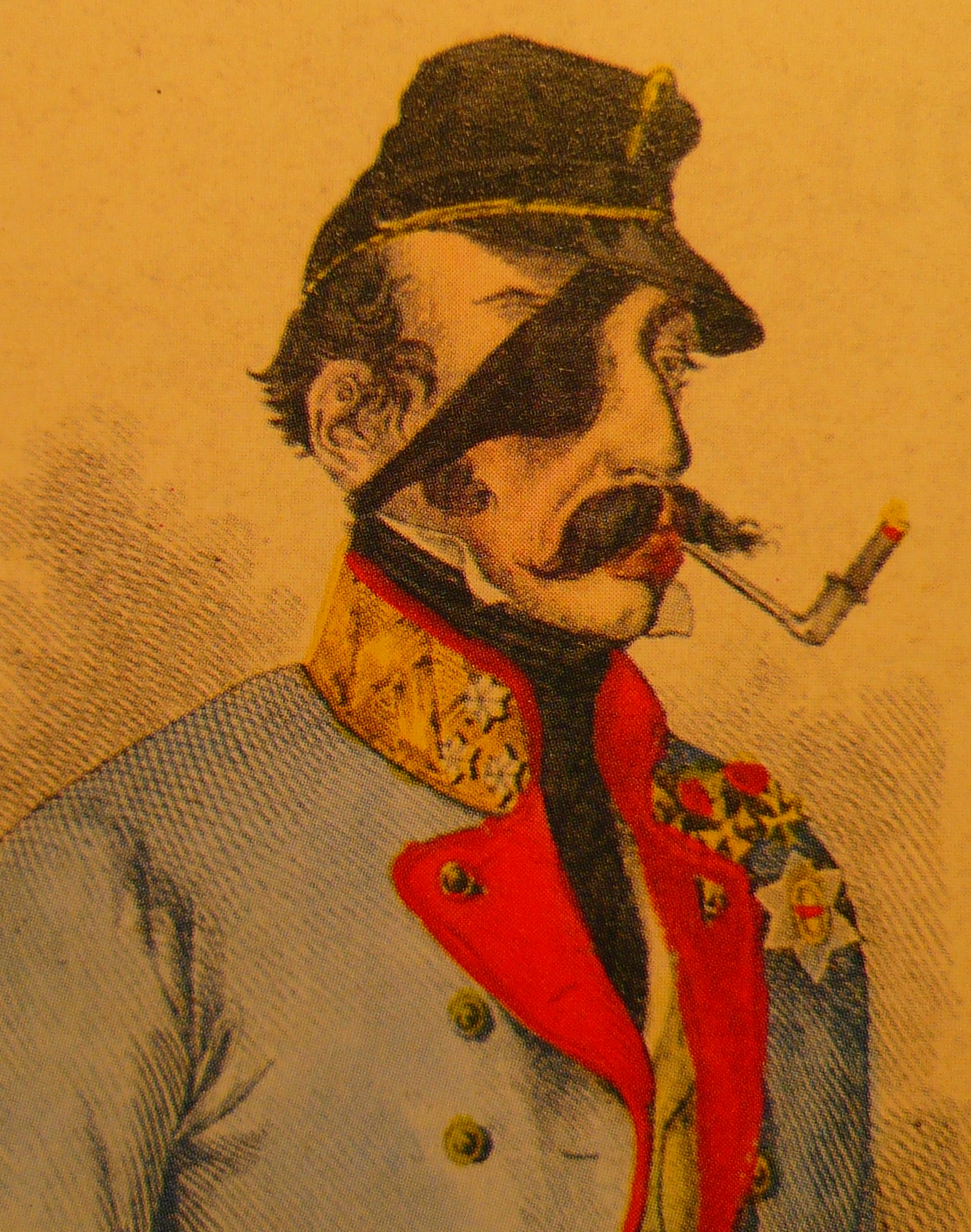
Franz Schlik with an eyepatch

Schlik waited two weeks before resuming the attack. By this time, György Klapka had reorganized the Upper Tisza legion and because of this, the Hungarians won the Battle of Tarcal on January 22 and the Battle of Bodrogkeresztúr the next day. On January 31 in the Battle of Tokaj Schlik and Windish-Grätz attacked Klapka's positions, losing again.

Richard Guyon's victory in the Battle of Branyiszkó created the possibility that Schlik would be surrounded, but Henryk Dembiński would not change his plans. Schlik's forces escaped and joined Windish-Grätz. The combined force won the Battle of Kápolna on 26–27 February.

Schlik took part in the Spring Campaign as the leader of the 3rd legion. He lost the battle against András Gáspár, the leader of the 7th Hungarian legion in the Battle of Hatvan on 2 April. He took part in the Battle of Isaszeg on 6 April and on 26 April in the First Battle of Komárom and later retreated in the direction of the River Rába.

In the Summer Campaign he took part as a leader of the 1st legion and so was in command at the Battle of Győr on 28 June and the Second and Third Battles of Komárom in July. Julius Jacob von Haynau moved the Austrian legions in three parallel lines against the Hungarians at Szeged. Schlik was the leader of the line that was advancing towards Makó and fought to cross the River Maros on 5 August.

In September 1849 Schlik was promoted to cavalry general and he received the Order of the Iron Crown and the Military Order of Maria Theresa for his victories.

== Aftermath ==
From 1854 he was Galicia and Bukovina commanding general. On 24 June 1859 he was made the commander of the 2nd Austrian army, which he led in the Battle of Solferino. After the Treaty of Villafranca he resigned his commission.

== Personal life ==
He was married to Countess Sophie von und zu Eltz genannt Faust von Stromberg. They had one son and two daughters.

== Honours ==
- Austrian Empire:
  - Knight of the Iron Crown, 1st Class, 1849
  - Commander of the Military Order of Maria Theresa, 1849
  - Military Merit Cross
- Russian Empire:
  - Knight of St. Alexander Nevsky, in Diamonds
  - Knight of St. Vladimir, 1st Class
  - Knight of the White Eagle
  - Knight of St. Anna, 1st Class in Diamonds
  - Knight of St. Stanislaus, 1st Class
- Kingdom of Hanover: Grand Cross of the Royal Guelphic Order
- Württemberg: Commander of the Württemberg Crown

== Sources ==
- Liptai, Ervin, ed. (1985), Magyarország hadtörténete két kötetben ("Military History of Hungary in Two Volumes") (in Hungarian), Zrínyi Katonai ("Zrinyi Military"), ISBN 963-326-337-9
- Hermann, Róbert (2004), Az 1848–1849-es szabadságharc nagy csatái ("Great Battles of the Hungarian Revolution of 1848-49") (in Hungarian), Zrínyi, ISBN 963-327-367-6
- hu:Révai Nagy Lexikona ("Revai's Hungarian Encyclopaedia")
