= Komárom-Esztergom County 2nd constituency =

Hungarian national legislative constituency

Komárom-Esztergom County 2nd constituency (Esztergom)
- Constituency for the National Assembly
- Location of Komárom-Esztergom county 02 within Komárom-Esztergom county

- Location of Komárom-Esztergom county within Hungary
- County: Komárom-Esztergom
- Electorate: 82,876 (2018)
- Major settlements: Esztergom

Current constituency
- Created: 2011
- Party: Tisza Party
- Member: Márk Radnai
- Elected: 2026

The 2nd constituency of Komárom-Esztergom County (Hungarian: Komárom-Esztergom megyei 02. számú országgyűlési egyéni választókerület) is one of the single member constituencies of the National Assembly, the national legislature of Hungary. The constituency standard abbreviation: Komárom-Esztergom 02. OEVK.

Since 2026, it has been represented by Márk Radnai of the Tisza Party.

== Geography ==
The 2nd constituency is located in eastern part of Komárom-Esztergom County.

=== List of municipalities ===
The constituency includes the following municipalities:

1. Annavölgy
2. Bajna
3. Bajót
4. Csolnok
5. Dág
6. Dorog
7. Dömös
8. Epöl
9. Esztergom
10. Gyermely
11. Héreg
12. Kesztölc
13. Lábatlan
14. Leányvár
15. Máriahalom
16. Mogyorósbánya
17. Nagysáp
18. Nyergesújfalu
19. Piliscsév
20. Pilismarót
21. Sárisáp
22. Süttő
23. Szomor
24. Tardos
25. Tarján
26. Tát
27. Tokod
28. Tokodaltáró
29. Úny
30. Vértestolna

== Members ==
The constituency was first represented by Pál Völner of the Fidesz from 2014 to 2022. He was succeeded by Gábor Erős of the Fidesz in 2022. In the 2026 election, Márk Radnai of the Tisza Party was elected representative.

Election	Member	Party	%	Ref.
2014	Pál Völner	Fidesz	45.92	
2018	Pál Völner	Fidesz	45.21	
2022	Gábor Erős	Fidesz	49.96	
2026	Márk Radnai	TISZA	56.85	
