= Komárom-Esztergom County 3rd constituency =

Hungarian national legislative constituency

Komárom-Esztergom County 3rd constituency (Komárom)
- Constituency for the National Assembly
- Location of Komárom-Esztergom county 03 within Komárom-Esztergom county

- Location of Komárom-Esztergom county within Hungary
- County: Komárom-Esztergom
- Electorate: 82,771 (2018)
- Major settlements: Komárom

Current constituency
- Created: 2011
- Party: Tisza Party
- Member: Nikolett Árvay
- Elected: 2026

The 3rd constituency of Komárom-Esztergom County (Hungarian: Komárom-Esztergom megyei 03. számú országgyűlési egyéni választókerület) is one of the single member constituencies of the National Assembly, the national legislature of Hungary. The constituency standard abbreviation: Komárom-Esztergom 03. OEVK.

Since 2026, it has been represented by Nikolett Árvay of the Tisza Party.

== Geography ==
The 3rd constituency is located in western part of Komárom-Esztergom County.

=== List of municipalities ===
The constituency includes the following municipalities:

1. Ács
2. Ácsteszér
3. Aka
4. Almásfüzitő
5. Ászár
6. Bábolna
7. Bakonybánk
8. Bakonysárkány
9. Bakonyszombathely
10. Bana
11. Bársonyos
12. Bokod
13. Császár
14. Csatka
15. Csém
16. Csép
17. Dad
18. Dunaalmás
19. Dunaszentmiklós
20. Ete
21. Kecskéd
22. Kerékteleki
23. Kisbér
24. Kisigmánd
25. Kocs
26. Komárom
27. Kömlőd
28. Környe
29. Mocsa
30. Nagyigmánd
31. Naszály
32. Neszmély
33. Oroszlány
34. Réde
35. Súr
36. Szákszend
37. Szomód
38. Tárkány
39. Várgesztes
40. Vérteskethely
41. Vértessomló

== Members ==
The constituency was first represented by Judit Czunyi-Bertalan of the Fidesz from 2014, and he was re-elected in 2018 and 2022. In the 2026 election, Nikolett Árvay of the Tisza Party was elected representative.

Election	Member	Party	%	Ref.
2014	Judit Czunyi-Bertalan	Fidesz	47.01	
2018	Judit Czunyi-Bertalan	Fidesz	50.99	
2022	Judit Czunyi-Bertalan	Fidesz	55.10	
2026	Nikolett Árvay	TISZA	53.03	
