= Tolnau =

Tolnau:

- German name of the Tolna County
- German name of Tolna, a town in Tolna County
- German name of Vértestolna

== See also ==
- Tolna (disambiguation)
