= Úny =

Coordinates: 47°38′33″N 18°44′16″E

- Location of Komárom-Esztergom county in Hungary
- Country: Hungary
- County: Komárom-Esztergom

Area
  - Total: 11.58 km^{2} (4.47 sq mi)

Population (2004)
  - Total: 652
  - Density: 56.3/km^{2} (146/sq mi)
- Time zone: UTC+1 (CET)
  - Summer (DST): UTC+2 (CEST)
- Postal code: 2528
- Area code: 33

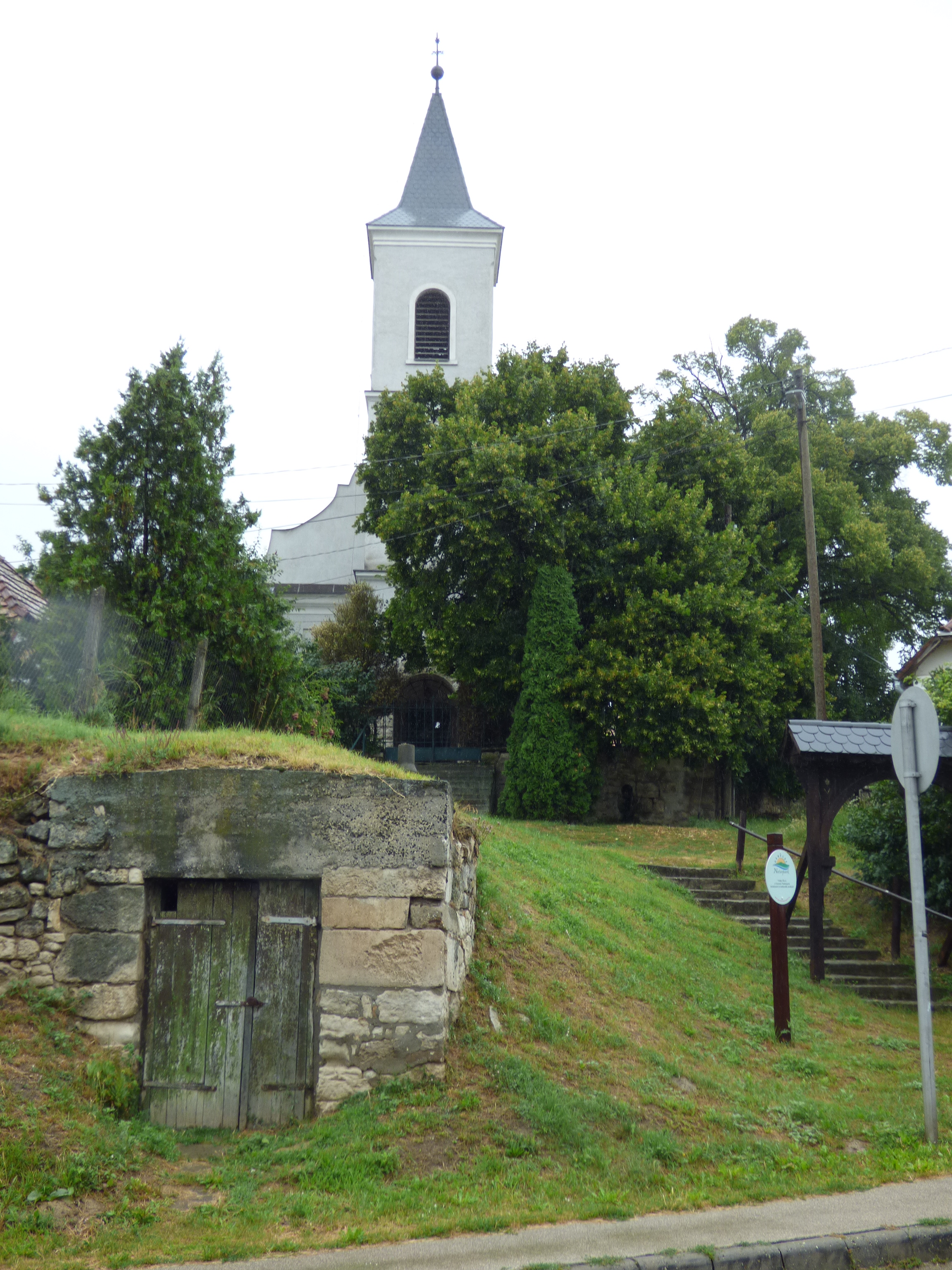
Az únyi református templom távlati képe

Úny is a village in Komárom-Esztergom county, Hungary.

== History ==
Archaeological finds suggest that the prehistoric place was Úny and its surroundings: both copper -era, Bronze Age, early Iron Age tiles were found. The Roman and Árpád-era dwelling and pits were found in the Baráthegyi Dűlő. The archaeological finds can be seen at the Balassa Bálint Museum in Esztergom. It is a remarkable four noble mansions that retain their original state. It is worth checking at Deák Ferenc u. No. 22 a 200-year-old residential building, which faithfully reflects the peasant dwelling model of the time. For a long time, the village was owned by public owners, so the tombstone and tombstone of several eminent family of Komárom Esztergom counties can be viewed in its Catholic cemetery. The remaining tombstones of the Old Cemetery and the Jewish cemetery are also valuable. The view of the private collection of the "polyhistor of the village", László Varga Mineral and rock is an interesting experience. On the outskirts of the settlement, some old cellars are reminiscent of former vine cultures and fruit growing (plum, pear). There are acacia and black pine forests installed above Taban and Rezső Hill. I have a forest steppe grove in the Páskom and Rezső Hill. The deeper part of the creek valleys is covered with reeds and will be accompanied by willow bushes.

== Location ==
Its location is on the southeast of the Gerecse Mountains, a Gerecse Mountains group in the northeastern corner of Transdanubia, on the southeast of the southeast of the Dombsági landscape, one branch of the Únyi stream, the Diós branch, is in the valley leading the Diósi branch. The village is 19 kilometers south of Esztergom, 35 kilometers northwest northwest of Budapest, 45 kilometers east of the county seat, Tatabánya, 11 km south of Dorog. Its direct neighbors are located 2.5 kilometers in the northwest, Mariahalom 2.5 kilometers in the southwest, 4 kilometers in the southeast, and Pilisjászfalu in the northeast 4.5 kilometers. The settlement passes through the 1106 road between Dorog and Tinnye, from which the 1122 road is branched out towards Mariahalom, Epöl and Bajna.

== Mayors ==
- 1990-1994 József Balázs
- 1994-2024 József Pósfai
- 2024- János Czakó

== Its landmarks ==
In 1794, a Reformed church was built in late Baroque style. In 1931, a tower was added. The Catholic Church is unique of its kind, since it has medieval foundations and for a while it was the Reformed. Bozay mansion Chlebovits mansion Valovits mansion.
