= Dad, Hungary =

Dad
- Municipality
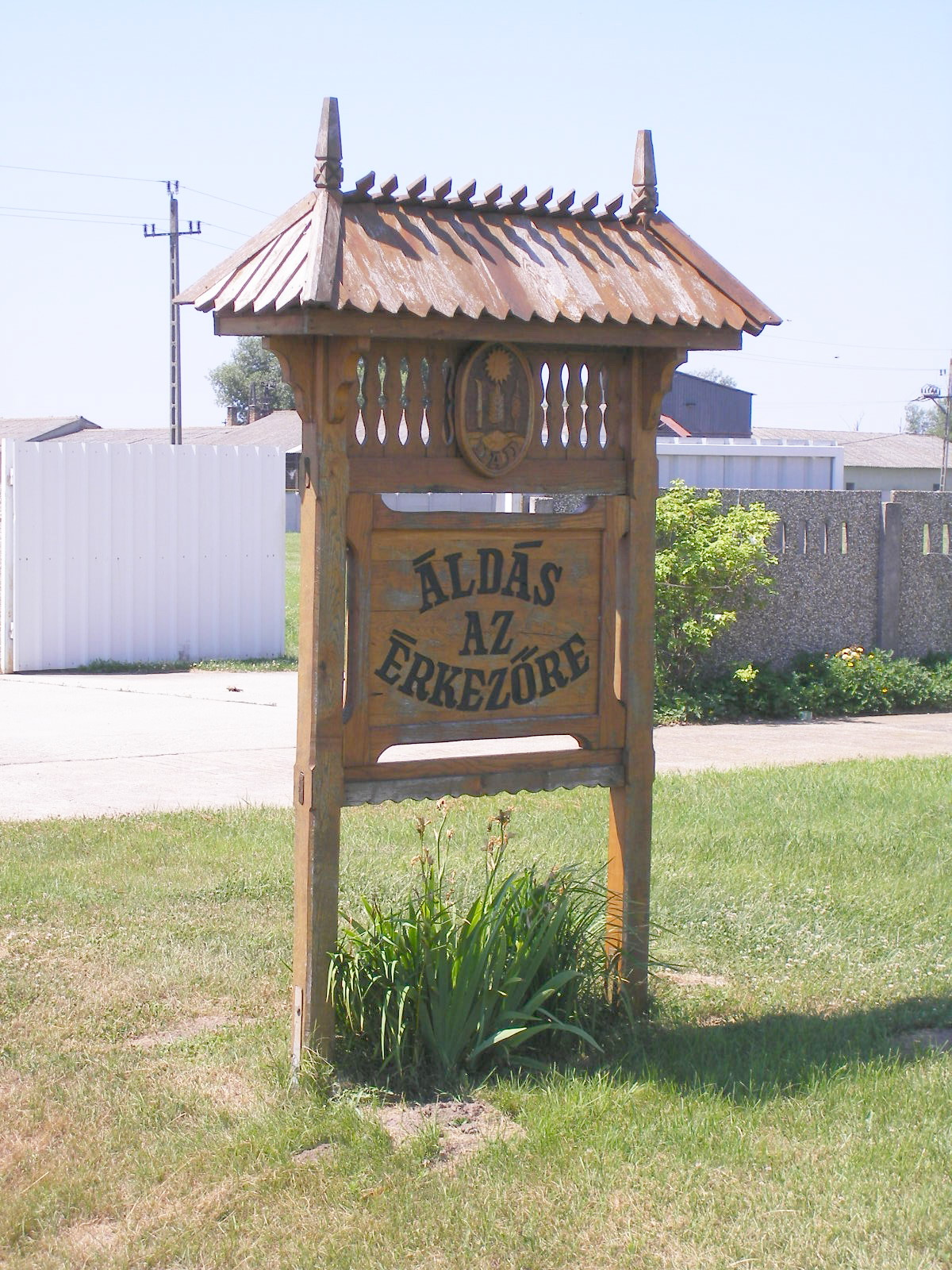
- The sign welcoming the arrivers

- Coat of arms

- Location of Komárom-Esztergom county in Hungary

- Location of Dad, Hungary
- Coordinates: 47.51836°N 18.22716°E
- Country: Hungary
- County: Komárom-Esztergom

Area
  - Total: 23.75 km^{2} (9.17 sq mi)

Population (2025)
  - Total: 952
  - Density: 41.26/km^{2} (106.9/sq mi)
- Time zone: UTC+1 (CET)
  - Summer (DST): UTC+2 (CEST)
- Postal code: 2854
- Area code: 34
- Website: www.dad.hu

Dad (Hungarian pronunciation: [dɒd]) is a village in Komárom-Esztergom county, Hungary.

== Location ==
The village is located on the northeastern part of the Vértes Mountains. It is located some 80 km (50 mi) away from the capital, and some 18 km (11 mi) away from the county capital.
