= Baj, Hungary =

Baj Wallern/Woj
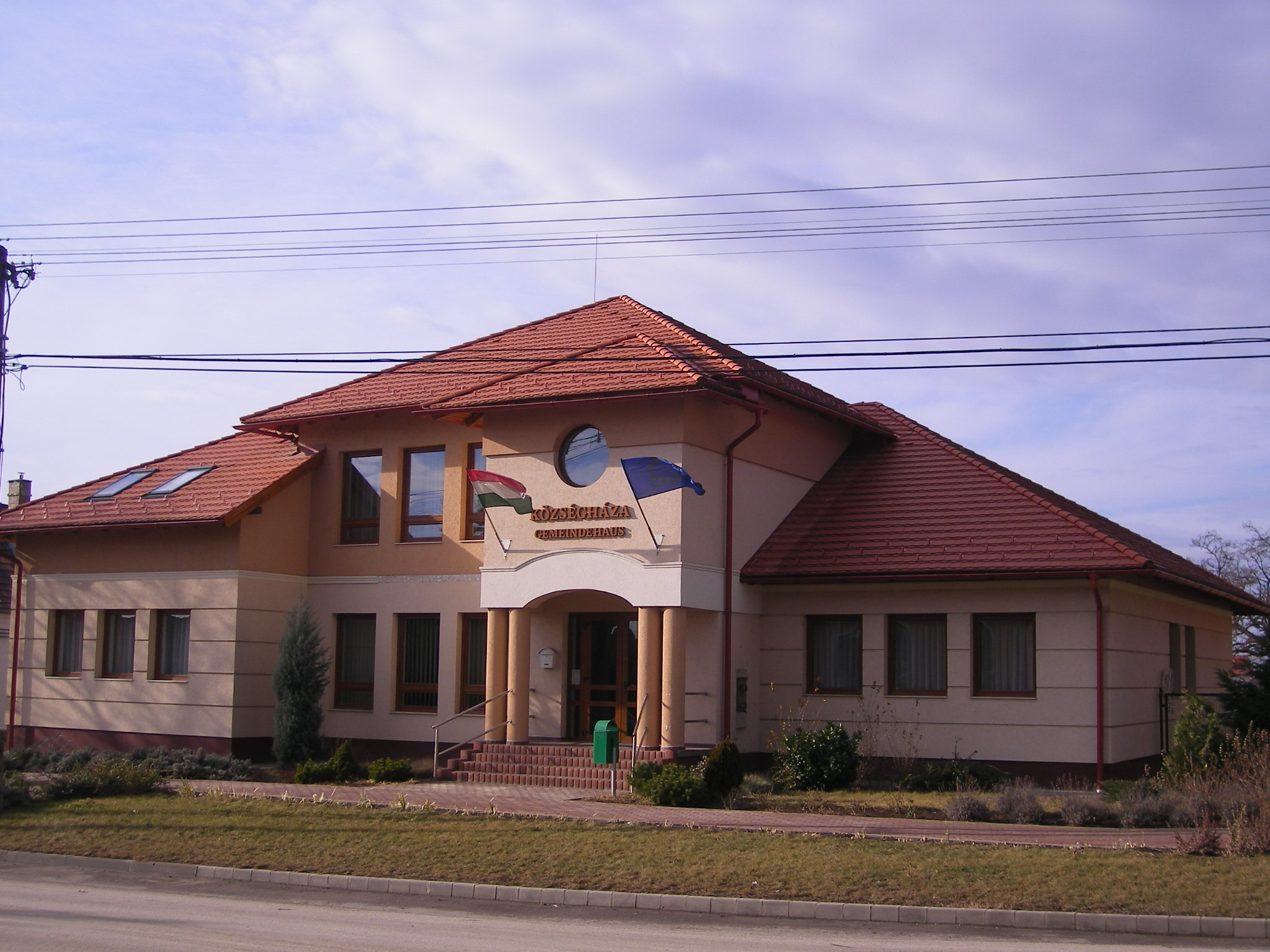
- Village hall

- Flag Coat of arms

- Location of Baj in Hungary
- Coordinates: 47.6495°N 18.3615°E
- Country: Hungary
- Region: Central Transdanubia
- County: Komárom-Esztergom

Area
  - Total: 21.13 km^{2} (8.16 sq mi)

Population (2012)
  - Total: 2,870
  - Density: 136/km^{2} (352/sq mi)
- Time zone: UTC+1 (CET)
  - Summer (DST): UTC+2 (CEST)
- Postal code: 2836
- Area code: +36 34
- Website: https://baj.hu/

Baj (German: Wallern, Woj) is a village in Komárom-Esztergom county, Hungary.
