= Sárisáp =

- Coat of arms

- Location of Komárom-Esztergom county in Hungary

- Location of Sárisáp
- Coordinates: 47.674653°N 18.680970°E
- Country: Hungary
- County: Komárom-Esztergom

Area
  - Total: 14.46 km^{2} (5.58 sq mi)

Population (2004)
  - Total: 2,960
  - Density: 204.7/km^{2} (530/sq mi)
- Time zone: UTC+1 (CET)
  - Summer (DST): UTC+2 (CEST)
- Postal code: 2523
- Area code: 33
- Website: https://sarisap.asp.lgov.hu/

Sárisáp is a village in Komárom-Esztergom County, Hungary.

== Rivalry with Annavölgy ==
Before Annavölgy became an independent town, it used to be part of Sárisáp, this has caused a sort of "rivalry" with the former.
