= Dág, Hungary =

Dág
- Village
- Location of Komárom-Esztergom county in Hungary

- Location of Dág
- Coordinates: 47°39′45″N 18°43′12″E
- Country: Hungary
- County: Komárom-Esztergom
- District: Esztergom

Area
  - Total: 11.88 km^{2} (4.59 sq mi)

Population (2004)
  - Total: 935
  - Density: 84/km^{2} (220/sq mi)
- Time zone: UTC+1 (CET)
  - Summer (DST): UTC+2 (CEST)
- Postal code: 2522
- Area code: (+36) 33

Dág (German: Dachau) is a village in Komárom-Esztergom county, Hungary with a population of 935 as of 2022.
