= Bakonysárkány =

Bakonysárkány _{Schargan}
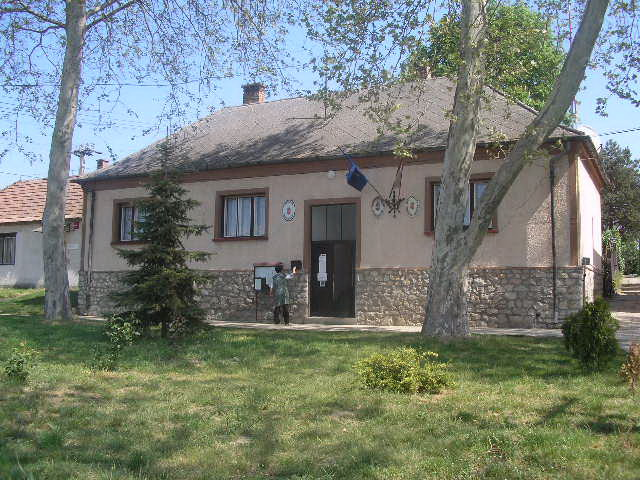
- Town hall

- Flag Coat of arms

- Location of Komárom-Esztergom county in Hungary

- Location of Bakonysárkány
- Coordinates: 47.44852°N 18.09916°E
- Country: Hungary
- County: Komárom-Esztergom

Area
  - Total: 14.13 km^{2} (5.46 sq mi)

Population (2004)
  - Total: 977
  - Density: 69.14/km^{2} (179.1/sq mi)
- Time zone: UTC+1 (CET)
  - Summer (DST): UTC+2 (CEST)
- Postal code: 2861
- Area code: 34

Bakonysárkány (German: Schargan) is a village in Komárom-Esztergom county, Hungary.
