= Szomód =

- Location of Komárom-Esztergom county in Hungary
- Country: Hungary
- County: Komárom-Esztergom

Area
  - Total: 28.31 km^{2} (10.93 sq mi)

Population (2004)
  - Total: 2,057
  - Density: 72.65/km^{2} (188.2/sq mi)
- Time zone: UTC+1 (CET)
  - Summer (DST): UTC+2 (CEST)
- Postal code: 2896
- Area code: 34

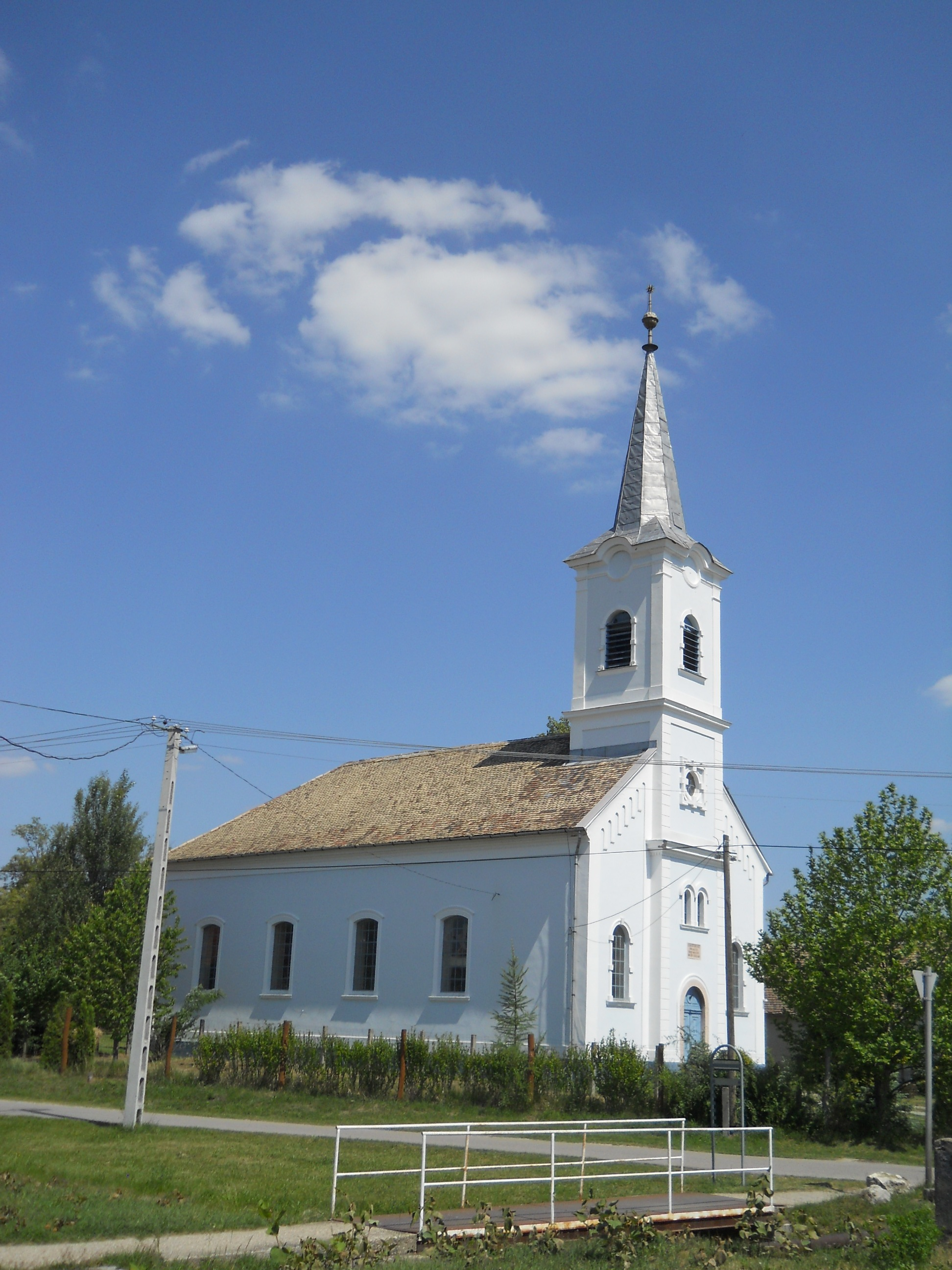
Szomód

Szomód (German: Sammet) is a village in Komárom-Esztergom county, Hungary.
