= Kecskéd =

Kecskéd Kätschka
- Location of Komárom-Esztergom county in Hungary

- Location of Kecskéd
- Coordinates: 47.52311°N 18.30683°E
- Country: Hungary
- County: Komárom-Esztergom

Area
  - Total: 11.08 km^{2} (4.28 sq mi)

Population (2004)
  - Total: 1,927
  - Density: 173.91/km^{2} (450.4/sq mi)
- Time zone: UTC+1 (CET)
  - Summer (DST): UTC+2 (CEST)
- Postal code: 2852
- Area code: 34

Kecskéd (German: Kätschka) is a village in Komárom-Esztergom county, Hungary.

== Sports club ==
- Kecskéd KSK
