= Ete, Hungary =

Ete
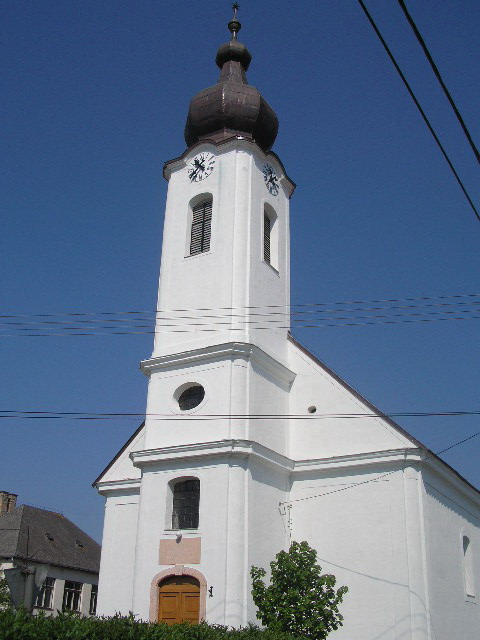

- Location of Komárom-Esztergom county in Hungary

- Location of Ete, Hungary
- Coordinates: 47.53169°N 18.07201°E
- Country: Hungary
- County: Komárom-Esztergom

Area
  - Total: 20.62 km^{2} (7.96 sq mi)

Population (2004)
  - Total: 598
  - Density: 29/km^{2} (75/sq mi)
- Time zone: UTC+1 (CET)
  - Summer (DST): UTC+2 (CEST)
- Postal code: 2947
- Area code: 34

Ete is a village in Komárom-Esztergom county, Hungary.
