= Súr =

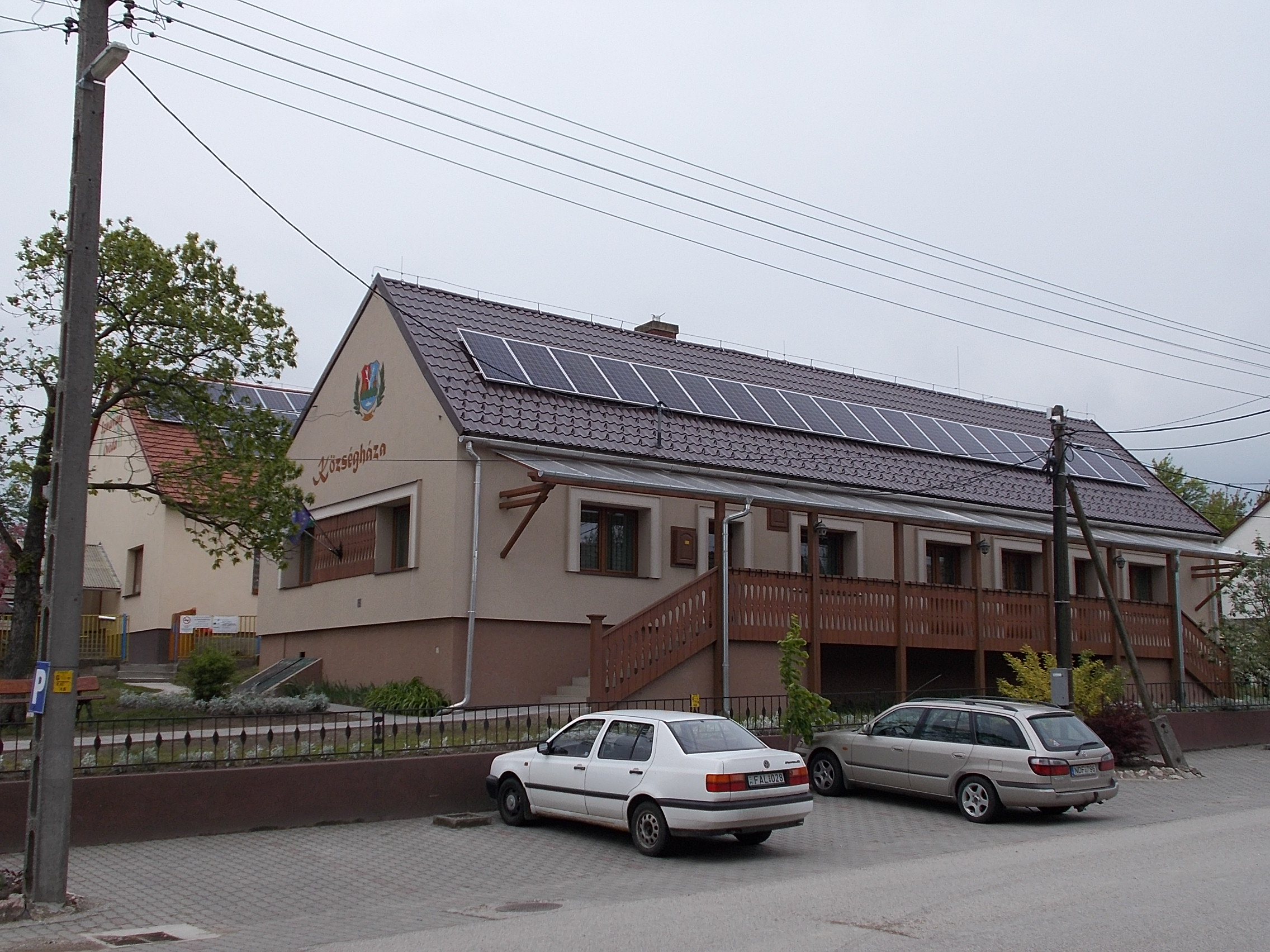
- Village hall

- Flag Coat of arms

- Location of Komárom-Esztergom county in Hungary

- Location of Súr
- Coordinates: 47.37084°N 18.02876°E
- Country: Hungary
- County: Komárom-Esztergom

Area
  - Total: 37.37 km^{2} (14.43 sq mi)

Population (2004)
  - Total: 1,327
  - Density: 35.5/km^{2} (92/sq mi)
- Time zone: UTC+1 (CET)
  - Summer (DST): UTC+2 (CEST)
- Postal code: 2889
- Area code: 34

Súr is a village in Komárom-Esztergom county, Hungary.
