= Dunaszentmiklós =

Dunaszentmiklós Niklo
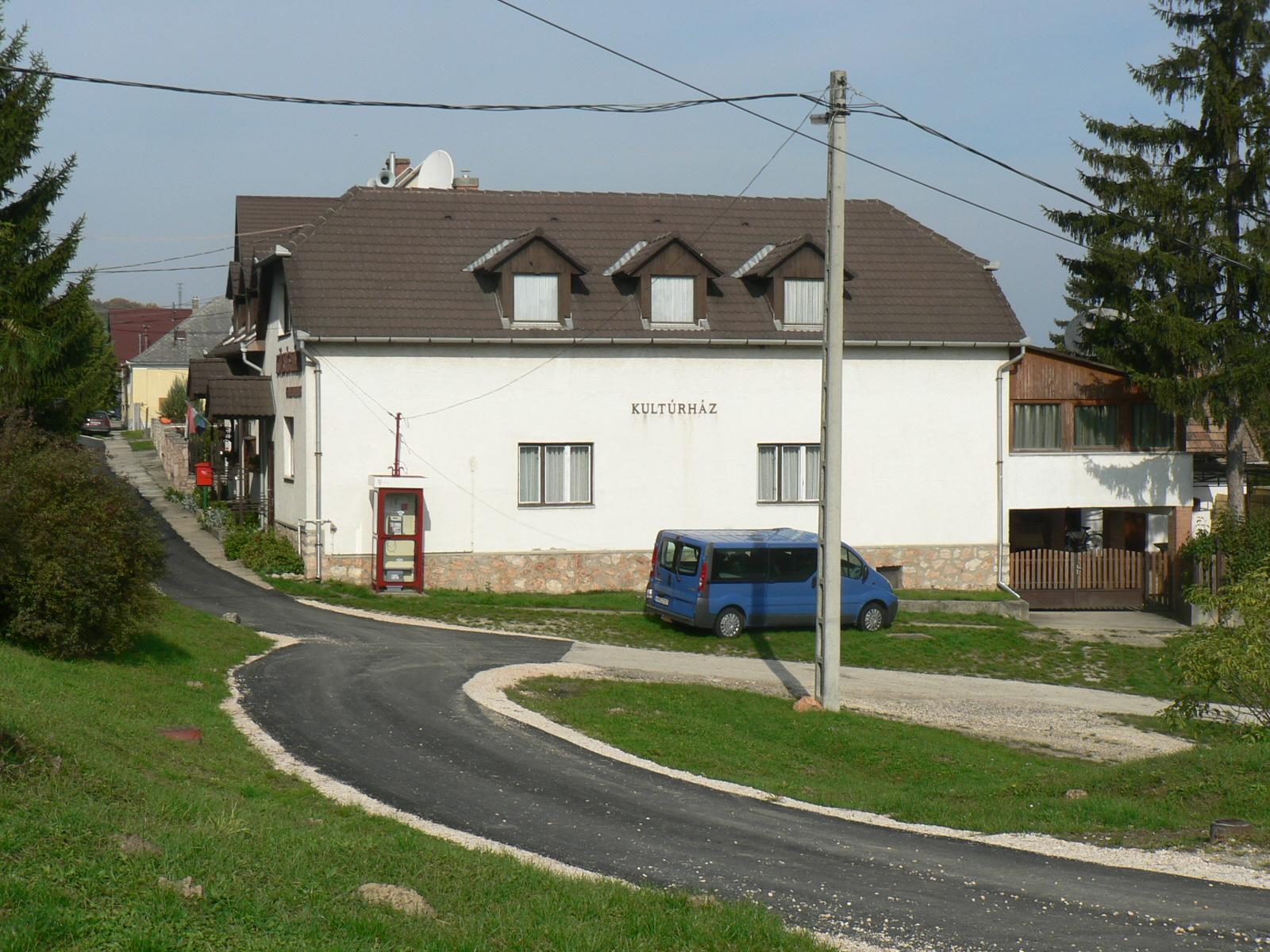
- Village hall

- Coat of arms

- Location of Komárom-Esztergom county in Hungary

- Location of Dunaszentmiklós
- Coordinates: 47.70567°N 18.37958°E
- Country: Hungary
- County: Komárom-Esztergom

Area
  - Total: 7.77 km^{2} (3.00 sq mi)

Population (2004)
  - Total: 431
  - Density: 55.46/km^{2} (143.6/sq mi)
- Time zone: UTC+1 (CET)
  - Summer (DST): UTC+2 (CEST)
- Postal code: 2897
- Area code: 34

Dunaszentmiklós (German: Niklo) is a village in Komárom-Esztergom County, Hungary.
