= Csép =

- Coat of arms

- Location of Komárom-Esztergom county in Hungary

- Location of Csép
- Coordinates: 47.57863°N 18.06365°E
- Country: Hungary
- County: Komárom-Esztergom

Area
  - Total: 20.06 km^{2} (7.75 sq mi)

Population (2004)
  - Total: 365
  - Density: 18.19/km^{2} (47.1/sq mi)
- Time zone: UTC+1 (CET)
  - Summer (DST): UTC+2 (CEST)
- Postal code: 2946
- Area code: 34

Csép is a village in Komárom-Esztergom county, Hungary.
