= Piliscsév =

- Location of Komárom-Esztergom county in Hungary

- Location of Piliscsév
- Coordinates: 47.67710°N 18.81489°E
- Country: Hungary
- County: Komárom-Esztergom

Area
  - Total: 24.9 km^{2} (9.6 sq mi)

Population (2004)
  - Total: 2,402
  - Density: 96.46/km^{2} (249.8/sq mi)
- Time zone: UTC+1 (CET)
  - Summer (DST): UTC+2 (CEST)
- Postal code: 2519
- Area code: 33

Piliscsév (Slovak: Čív) is a village in Komárom-Esztergom county, Hungary.

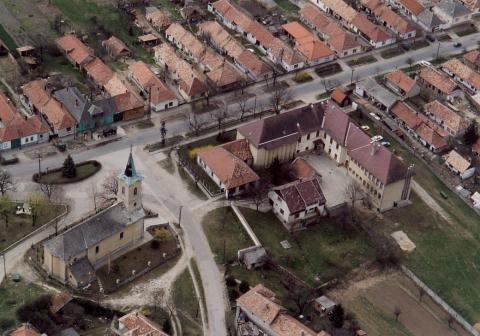
Aerial photography of Piliscsév
