= Almásfüzitő =

Almásfüzitő Lepavista / Azaum / Odiavum (in Latin)
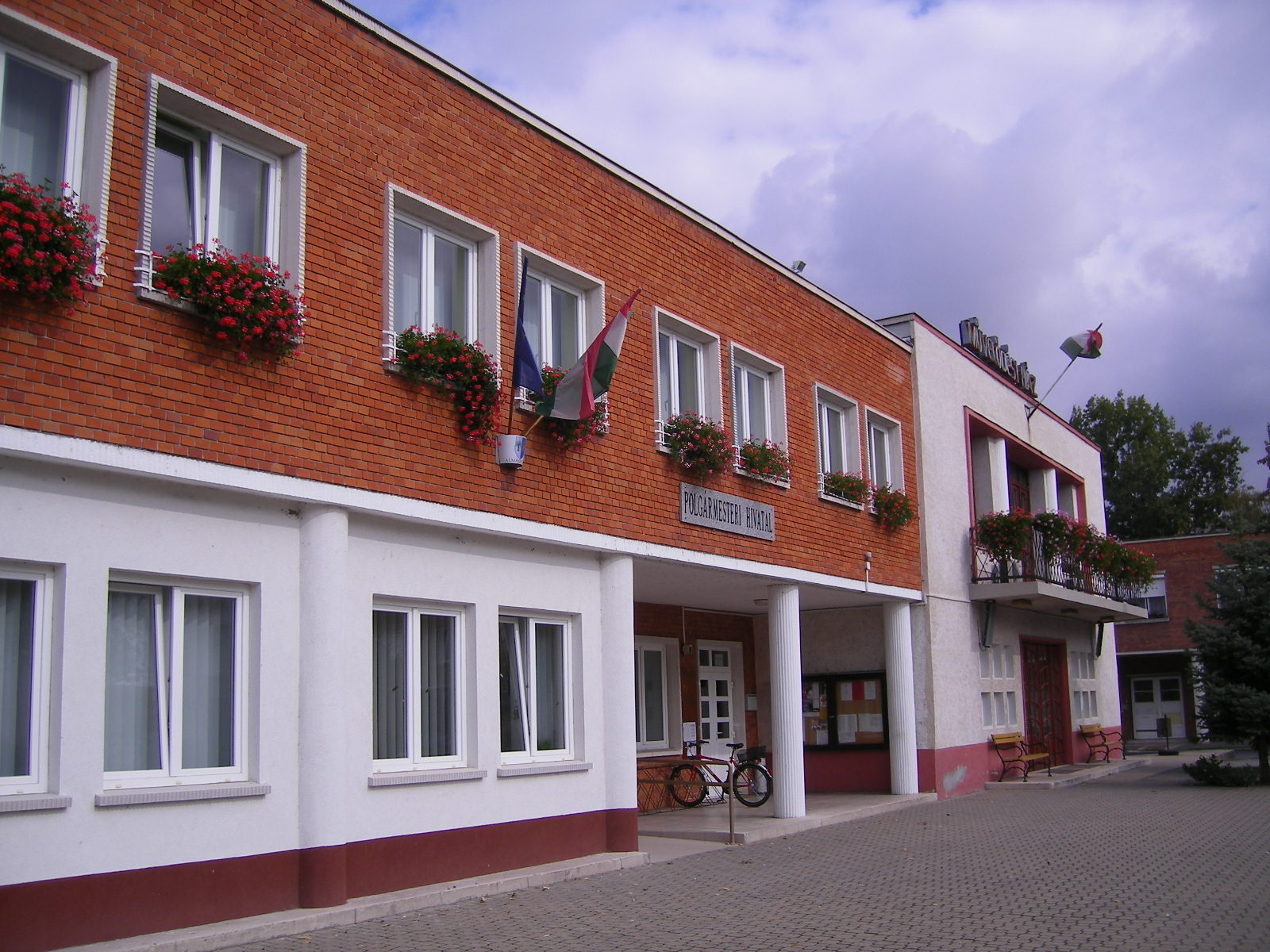
- Village hall

- Flag Coat of arms

- Location of Komárom-Esztergom county in Hungary

- Location of Almásfüzitő
- Coordinates: 47.72870°N 18.25539°E
- Country: Hungary
- County: Komárom-Esztergom

Area
  - Total: 8.19 km^{2} (3.16 sq mi)

Population (2015)
  - Total: 2,047
  - Density: 250/km^{2} (647/sq mi)
- Time zone: UTC+1 (CET)
  - Summer (DST): UTC+2 (CEST)
- Postal code: 2931
- Area code: 34
- Website: Almásfüzitő online

Almásfüzitő is a village in Komárom-Esztergom county, Hungary. During the Oil Campaign of World War II, the Almásfüzitő oil refinery was bombed by the United States Army Air Forces.

== Popular culture ==
In the 2014 video game Metal Gear Solid V: Ground Zeroes, an audio tape can be found. On this tape, the heavily scarred antagonist Skull Face describes a traumatizing incident from his childhood in which the weapons factory his parents worked at was bombed; his parents were killed and he was maimed by burning hot oil. The events told seem to align with the real-life events of the bombing. Adding further credence to his story is that Skull Face occasionally speaks Hungarian to his underlings.
