= Csolnok =

Village in Komárom-Esztergom, Hungary

Csolnok Tscholnok
- Location of Komárom-Esztergom county in Hungary

- Location of Csolnok
- Coordinates: 47.69347°N 18.71304°E
- Country: Hungary
- County: Komárom-Esztergom

Area
  - Total: 18.7 km^{2} (7.2 sq mi)

Population (2004)
  - Total: 3,402
  - Density: 181.92/km^{2} (471.2/sq mi)
- Time zone: UTC+1 (CET)
  - Summer (DST): UTC+2 (CEST)
- Postal code: 2521
- Area code: 33

Csolnok (German: Tscholnok or Tschaunok) is a village in Komárom-Esztergom County, Hungary.
