= Mogyorósbánya =

- Coat of arms

- Location of Komárom-Esztergom county in Hungary
- Country: Hungary
- County: Komárom-Esztergom

Area
  - Total: 7.33 km^{2} (2.83 sq mi)

Population (2004)
  - Total: 886
  - Density: 120.87/km^{2} (313.1/sq mi)
- Time zone: UTC+1 (CET)
  - Summer (DST): UTC+2 (CEST)
- Postal code: 2535
- Area code: 33

Mogyorósbánya (German: Moderesch) is a village in Komárom-Esztergom county, Hungary.
