= Vértessomló =

Vértessomló Schemling
- Location of Komárom-Esztergom county in Hungary

- Location of Vértessomló
- Coordinates: 47.50974°N 18.36705°E
- Country: Hungary
- County: Komárom-Esztergom

Area
  - Total: 22.3 km^{2} (8.6 sq mi)

Population (2004)
  - Total: 1,356
  - Density: 60.8/km^{2} (157/sq mi)
- Time zone: UTC+1 (CET)
  - Summer (DST): UTC+2 (CEST)
- Postal code: 2823
- Area code: 34

Vértessomló (German: Schemling) is a village in Komárom-Esztergom County, Hungary.

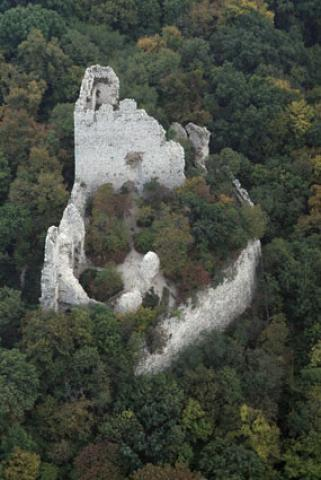
Vértessomló - Vitány castle from a bird's eye view

On January 29, 2011, a moderate earthquake struck below Vértessomló. 26 damage cases have been reported in the greater epicenter area. It was essentially light damage like cracks in walls and fallen chimneys. The earthquake had a magnitude of 4.3 at a shallow focal depth of 5 km. People in Vértessomló and in Oroszlány ran into the streets and stayed there for a couple of hours because of the fear for aftershocks. The earthquake was well felt in Budapest.
