= Kerékteleki =

- Flag Coat of arms

- Location of Komárom-Esztergom county in Hungary

- Location of Kerékteleki
- Coordinates: 47.51635°N 17.93892°E
- Country: Hungary
- County: Komárom-Esztergom

Area
  - Total: 29.46 km^{2} (11.37 sq mi)

Population (2004)
  - Total: 708
  - Density: 24.03/km^{2} (62.2/sq mi)
- Time zone: UTC+1 (CET)
  - Summer (DST): UTC+2 (CEST)
- Postal code: 2882
- Area code: 34

Kerékteleki is a village in Komárom-Esztergom county, Hungary.
