= Lábatlan =

- Town
- Flag Coat of arms

- Location of Komárom-Esztergom county in Hungary

- Location of Lábatlan
- Coordinates: 47.74801°N 18.48746°E
- Country: Hungary
- County: Komárom-Esztergom
- District: Esztergom

Area
  - Total: 26.35 km^{2} (10.17 sq mi)

Population (2004)
  - Total: 5,316
  - Density: 201.74/km^{2} (522.5/sq mi)
- Time zone: UTC+1 (CET)
  - Summer (DST): UTC+2 (CEST)
- Postal code: 2541
- Area code: (+36) 33
- Website: labatlan.hu

Lábatlan (German: Labeland) is a town in Komárom-Esztergom county, Hungary.

== Archaeological sites ==
After comparing satellite imagery with photographs from 1994 in the Aerial Archaeological Archive of Pécs, archaeologists from the National Archaeological Institute of the Hungarian National Museum and the Pázmány Péter Catholic University initiated field work near Lábatlan, and unearthen three Avar-era graves in May 2025. The site included iron buckles, knives and rings, spindle whorls, earrings, coins, and pottery fragments.
