= Tolna =

Tolna may refer to:

- Tolna, Hungary, a town in Hungary (population 12,184)
- Tolna (county), a county in Hungary (population 238,400)
- Tolna (moth), a genus of moths in the family Erebidae
- The former Yiddish name of Talne, a town in Ukraine (population 16,388)
- Tolna, North Dakota, a village in the United States (population 202)
