= Tardos, Tata =

Tardos
- Location of Tardos in Hungary
- Coordinates: 47°39′42″N 18°26′36″E
- Country: Hungary
- County: Komárom-Esztergom

Area
  - Total: 23.32 km^{2} (9.00 sq mi)

Population (2015)
  - Total: 1,617
  - Density: 6,933/km^{2} (17,960/sq mi)
- Time zone: UTC+1 (CET)
  - Summer (DST): UTC+2 (CEST)
- Postal code: 2834
- Area code: 34

Tardos is a village in Tata District in the county of Komárom-Esztergom, northern Hungary.
