= Csatka =

- Flag Coat of arms

- Location of Komárom-Esztergom county in Hungary

- Location of Csatka
- Coordinates: 47.38032°N 17.97629°E
- Country: Hungary
- County: Komárom-Esztergom

Area
  - Total: 17.77 km^{2} (6.86 sq mi)

Population (2004)
  - Total: 302
  - Density: 16.99/km^{2} (44.0/sq mi)
- Time zone: UTC+1 (CET)
  - Summer (DST): UTC+2 (CEST)
- Postal code: 2888
- Area code: 34

Csatka (German: Tschatkau) is a village in Komárom-Esztergom county, in north-western Hungary. It is a small rural settlement situated near the Bakony Mountains and forms part of the county's traditional countryside communities.
