= Süttő =

Süttő _{Schitte}
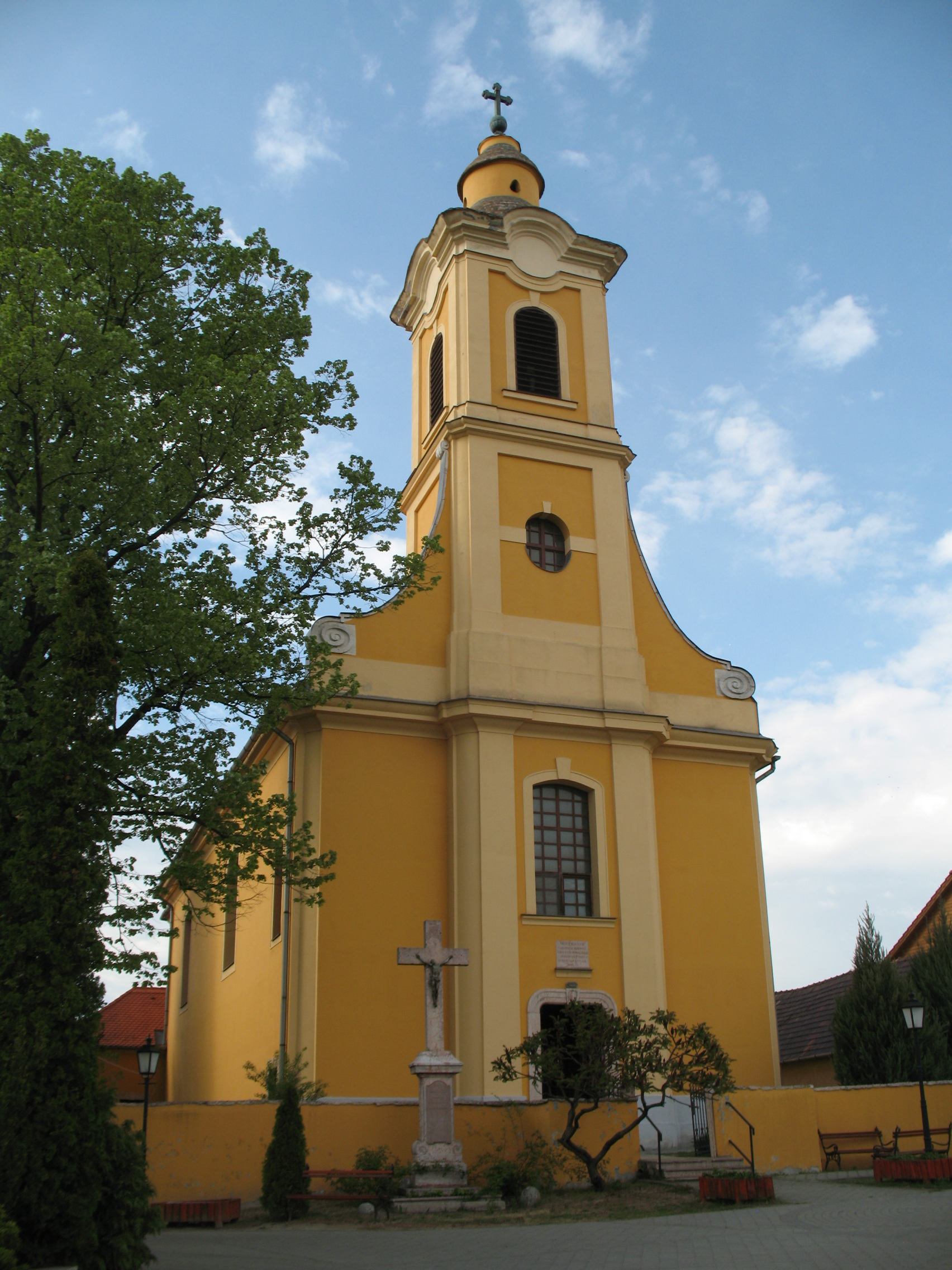
- A church in Süttő

- Coat of arms

- Location of Komárom-Esztergom county in Hungary
- Country: Hungary
- County: Komárom-Esztergom

Area
  - Total: 34.51 km^{2} (13.32 sq mi)

Population (2004)
  - Total: 2,041
  - Density: 59.14/km^{2} (153.2/sq mi)
- Time zone: UTC+1 (CET)
  - Summer (DST): UTC+2 (CEST)
- Postal code: 2543
- Area code: 33

Süttő (German: Schitte) is a village in Komárom-Esztergom county, Hungary.
