= Aka, Hungary =

Aka
- Flag Coat of arms

- Location of Aka, Hungary
- Coordinates: 47.40207°N 18.07163°E
- Country: Hungary
- County: Komárom-Esztergom

Area
  - Total: 18.1 km^{2} (7.0 sq mi)

Population (2015)
  - Total: 243
  - Density: 13.4/km^{2} (34.8/sq mi)
- Time zone: UTC+1 (CET)
  - Summer (DST): UTC+2 (CEST)
- Postal code: 2862
- Area code: 34

Aka (German: Acker) is a village in Komárom-Esztergom county, Hungary.

== History ==
The land of the village was first mentioned in a charter in 1358. After the Ottoman rule, the depopulated village was populated by Roman Catholic Slovaks and Germans. After the Second World War with the compulsory resettlement of the Germans, the population of the village decreased significantly. Today, it has the smallest number of inhabitants. The church of the village was built in 1790.
