= Nagysáp =

- Location of Komárom-Esztergom county in Hungary

- Location of Nagysáp
- Coordinates: 47.68481°N 18.60163°E
- Country: Hungary
- County: Komárom-Esztergom

Area
  - Total: 24.77 km^{2} (9.56 sq mi)

Population (2004)
  - Total: 1,541
  - Density: 62.21/km^{2} (161.1/sq mi)
- Time zone: UTC+1 (CET)
  - Summer (DST): UTC+2 (CEST)
- Postal code: 2524
- Area code: 33

Nagysáp is a village in Komárom-Esztergom county, Hungary.
