= Tokodaltáró =

- Location of Komárom-Esztergom county in Hungary
- Country: Hungary
- County: Komárom-Esztergom

Area
  - Total: 5.54 km^{2} (2.14 sq mi)

Population (2004)
  - Total: 3,180
  - Density: 574/km^{2} (1,490/sq mi)
- Time zone: UTC+1 (CET)
  - Summer (DST): UTC+2 (CEST)
- Postal code: 2532
- Area code: 33

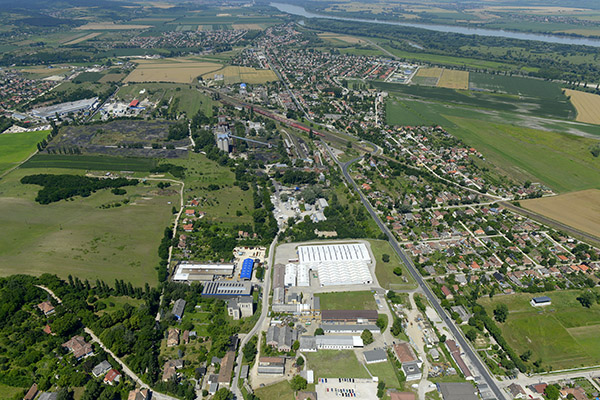
Tokodaltáró látképe légifelvételen

Tokodaltáró is a village in Komárom-Esztergom county, Hungary.
