= Kesztölc =

Kesztölc Kestúc
- Flag Coat of arms

- Location of Komárom-Esztergom county in Hungary

- Location of Kesztölc
- Coordinates: 47.71358°N 18.79520°E
- Country: Hungary
- County: Komárom-Esztergom

Area
  - Total: 21.98 km^{2} (8.49 sq mi)

Population (2004)
  - Total: 2,633
  - Density: 119.79/km^{2} (310.3/sq mi)
- Time zone: UTC+1 (CET)
  - Summer (DST): UTC+2 (CEST)
- Postal code: 2517
- Area code: 33

Kesztölc (Slovak: Kestúc) is a village in Komárom-Esztergom County, Hungary.

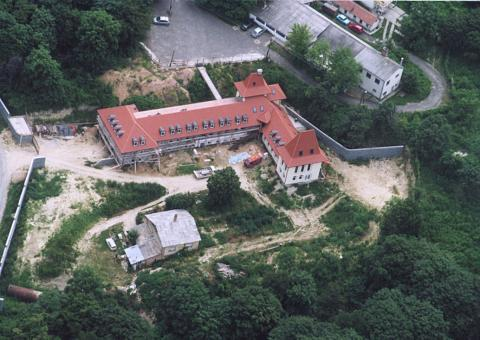
Aerial photography of Kesztölc-klastrompuszta

== Etymology ==
The origin of the village's name is thought to be Slavic or German. The Slav word kostolec or kostolac means small castle, fortified church or nunnery, while the German version (Kestenholz - chestnut tree) dates back to the 12-15th centuries. In the documents many versions appear, of which the Hungarian name was spelt Kesztölcz until 1907.

== The history of Kesztölc ==
The village Kesztölc is located by the foot of Mount Pilis, which emerges 720 m above sea level. The number of inhabitants is 2,400. The nearby Klastrompuszta also belongs to the settlement.

Beginning with the Copper Age, the traces of nearly every culture have been found on the site of the village. Before the Magyar conquest of Hungary, it was inhabited by Celts and Avars. As proved by several bricks with Roman inscriptions unearthed near the village, the Romans also founded a colony here, beyond the main road leading to Aquincum. The first documented mention of Kesztölc goes back to the deed of foundation of the Abbey of Garamszentbenedek, founded by King Géza I in 1075. A document issued by King András III in 1294 refers to Kesztölc as the possession of the Chapter of Esztergom. In 1439 King Albert endorsed the Chapter as the owner of Kesztölc, the area of which also included a puszta (field with scattered farmsteads) called Nyír. In the Middle Ages the village belonged to the comitat of Pilis, and from 1593 onward to that of Esztergom. During the Turkish occupation it remained a populated settlement as part of the Sanjak (Turkish administrative district) of Esztergom.

The first Slovak settlers arrived in 1716, and since then Kesztölc has been a bilingual settlement. Most dwellers made their living out of agriculture, animal husbandry and forestry. Before the turn of the 19th and 20th centuries the majority of the men worked in the coal mines of Dorog. The history of the local school can be traced down from written records since 1732. The voluntary firemen's association formed in 1895. The mayor's office was built in 1905, whereas the building of the workers' home was sponsored by the coal mines of Dorog. The public library opened in 1937. The stone cross erected in front of the parish church was made in 1790, and the rural Baroque statue of St Urban was carved in the early 1800s. The building of the village museum, opened in 1964, is a listed monument.

The village presumably had a church as early as the 11-12th centuries, but the present Baroque-style church was built in 1800. Since the Middle Ages, Kesztölc has had extensive vineyards and orchards. Between 1250 and 1304 the centre of the Pauline Order, the first religious order founded by the Hungarians, operated at Klastrompuszta. The complex of the Monastery of the Holy Cross itself, founded by the Blessed Özséb, was destroyed in 1526, when the invading Turks burnt down all the monasteries in the Pilis region.
