= Ászár =

- Location of Komárom-Esztergom county in Hungary

- Location of Ászár
- Coordinates: 47.50950°N 18.00314°E
- Country: Hungary
- County: Komárom-Esztergom

Area
  - Total: 18.69 km^{2} (7.22 sq mi)

Population (2004)
  - Total: 1,702
  - Density: 91.06/km^{2} (235.8/sq mi)
- Time zone: UTC+1 (CET)
  - Summer (DST): UTC+2 (CEST)
- Postal code: 2881
- Area code: 34

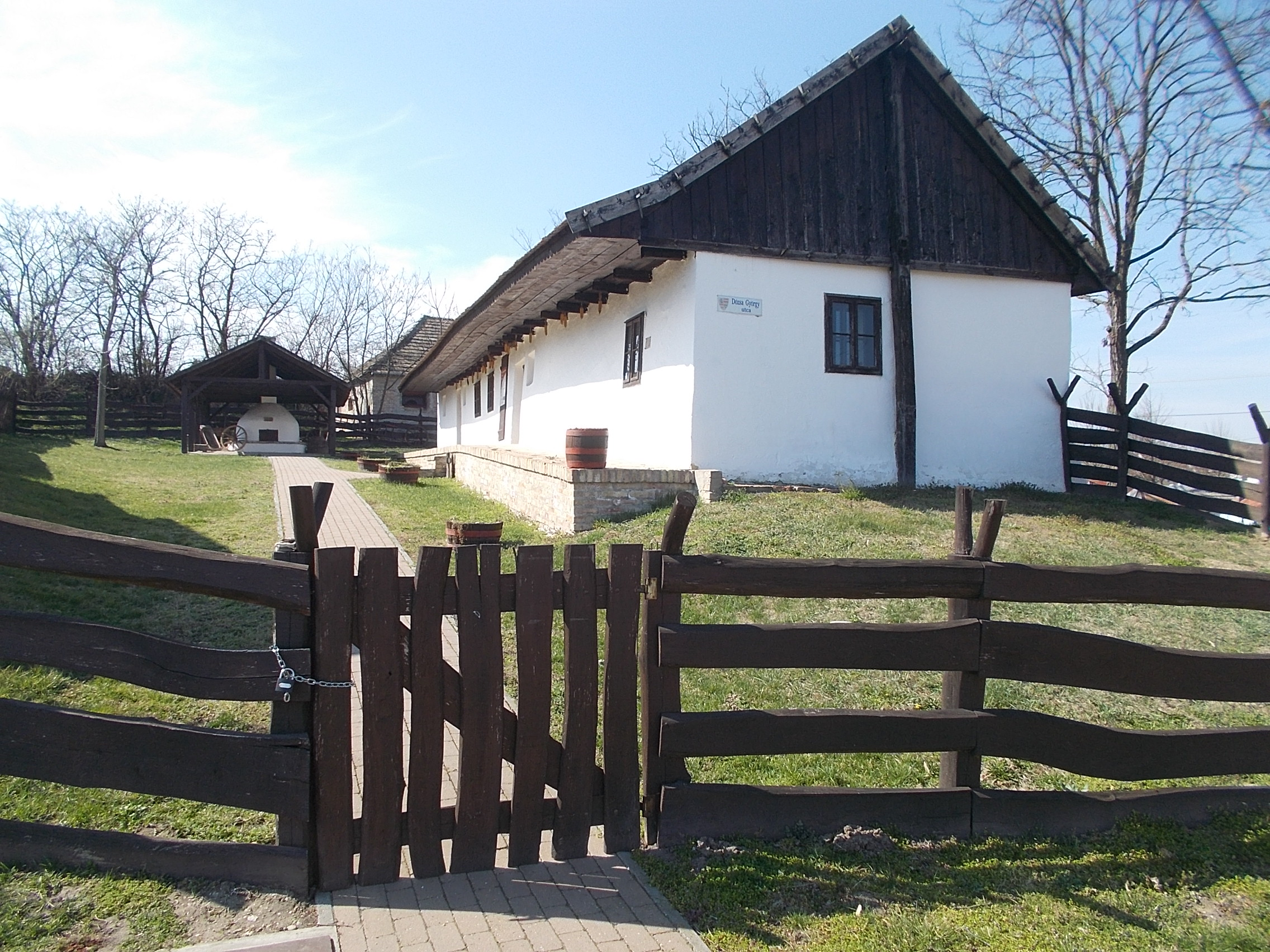
House on Dózsa György Street, Ászár

Ászár is a village in Komárom-Esztergom county, Hungary. Ászár has approximately 1,645 inhabitants and has had its own independent local council since January 2003.

There are a wide range of visitor attractions such as the Saliházi forest, the natural lake along the Saliházi ditch, the Roman Catholic Church, the tombstone of Petrus Kulinger, and the Lutheran Church. Ászár is also a part of the Ászár-Bársonyos historical wine region.
