= Gyermely =

- Location of Komárom-Esztergom County in Hungary

- Location of Gyermely
- Coordinates: 47.59187°N 18.64178°E
- Country: Hungary
- County: Komárom-Esztergom

Area
  - Total: 45.45 km^{2} (17.55 sq mi)

Population (2025)
  - Total: 1,545
  - Density: 31.85/km^{2} (82.5/sq mi)
- Time zone: UTC+1 (CET)
  - Summer (DST): UTC+2 (CEST)
- Postal code: 2821
- Area code: 34

Gyermely is a village in Komárom-Esztergom County, Hungary. It has a population of around 1,545 people and is located 24 kms east from Tatabánya. The village is known for its pasta factory and in 2017, construction of a second plant site began that would increase production.

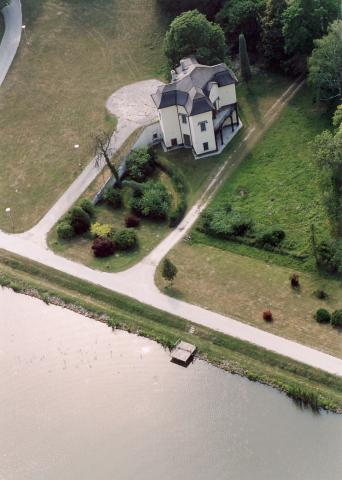
Aerial photography of Gyermely

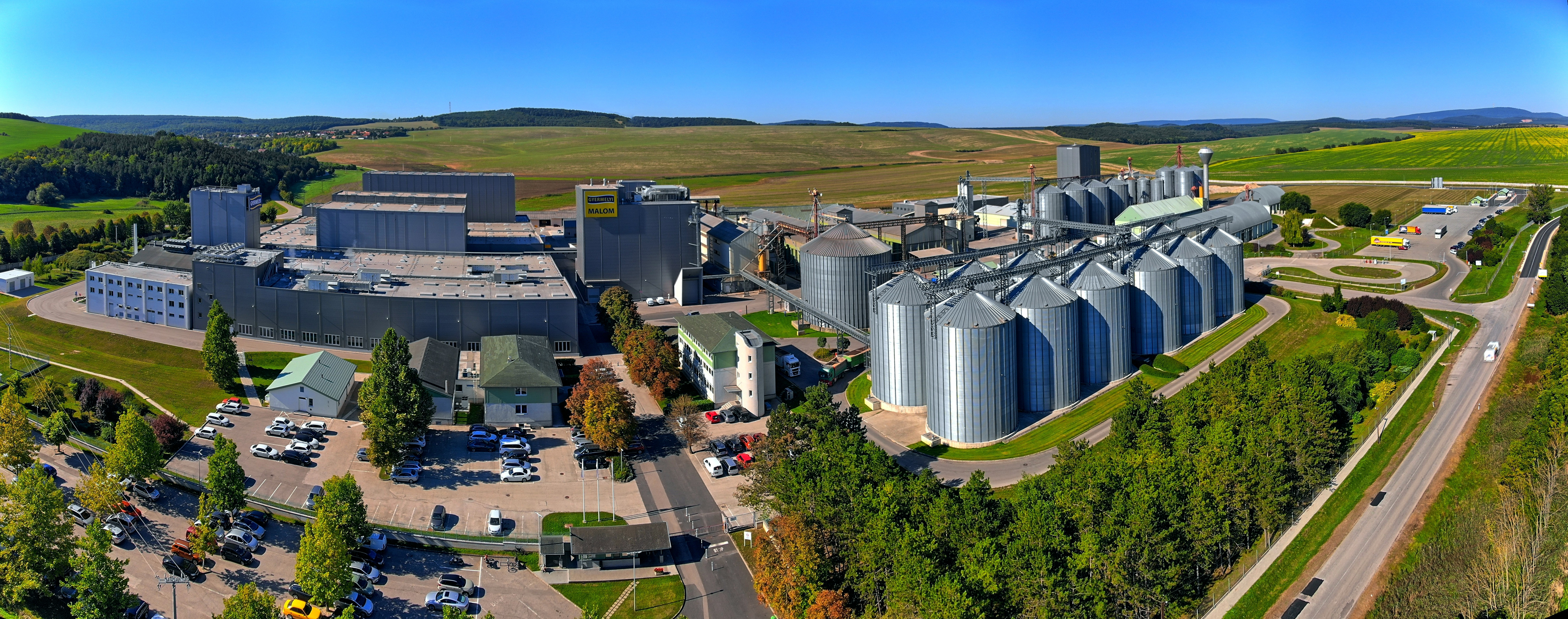
The Gyermelyi pasta factory
