= Tárkány =

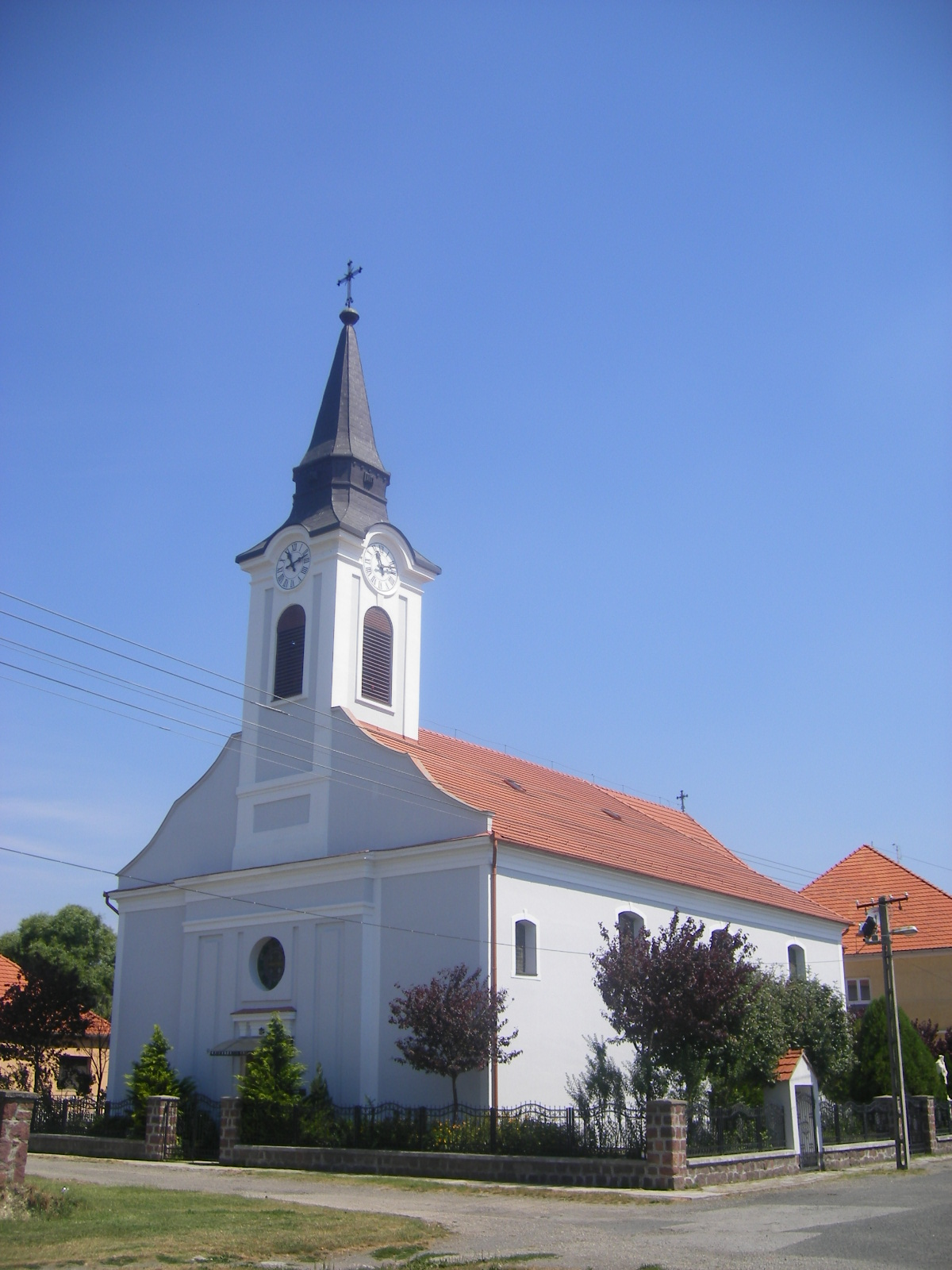

- Flag Coat of arms

- Location of Tárkány
- Coordinates: 47.59135°N 18.00366°E
- Country: Hungary
- County: Komárom-Esztergom

Area
  - Total: 64.99 km^{2} (25.09 sq mi)

Population (2004)
  - Total: 1,625
  - Density: 25/km^{2} (65/sq mi)
- Time zone: UTC+1 (CET)
  - Summer (DST): UTC+2 (CEST)
- Postal code: 2945
- Area code: 34

Tárkány is a village in Komárom-Esztergom county, Hungary.

Tárkány has 1444 inhabitants (2015). The place had several settlement such as Major, Mihályháza, Ölbő, Parragh and Vasdinnye-puszta.

The Roman Catholic Church was built in 1734 and the Reformed Church in 1800.
