= Bársonyos =

- Location of Komárom-Esztergom County in Hungary

- Location of Bársonyos
- Coordinates: 47.51140°N 17.91897°E
- Country: Hungary
- County: Komárom-Esztergom

Area
  - Total: 16.87 km^{2} (6.51 sq mi)

Population (2004)
  - Total: 855
  - Density: 50.68/km^{2} (131.3/sq mi)
- Time zone: UTC+1 (CET)
  - Summer (DST): UTC+2 (CEST)
- Postal code: 2883
- Area code: 34

Bársonyos is a village in Komárom-Esztergom County, Hungary.
