= Bakonyszombathely =

- Location of Komárom-Esztergom county in Hungary

- Location of Bakonyszombathely
- Coordinates: 47.47208°N 17.96018°E
- Country: Hungary
- County: Komárom-Esztergom

Area
  - Total: 36.53 km^{2} (14.10 sq mi)

Population (2004)
  - Total: 1,528
  - Density: 41.82/km^{2} (108.3/sq mi)
- Time zone: UTC+1 (CET)
  - Summer (DST): UTC+2 (CEST)
- Postal code: 2884
- Area code: 34

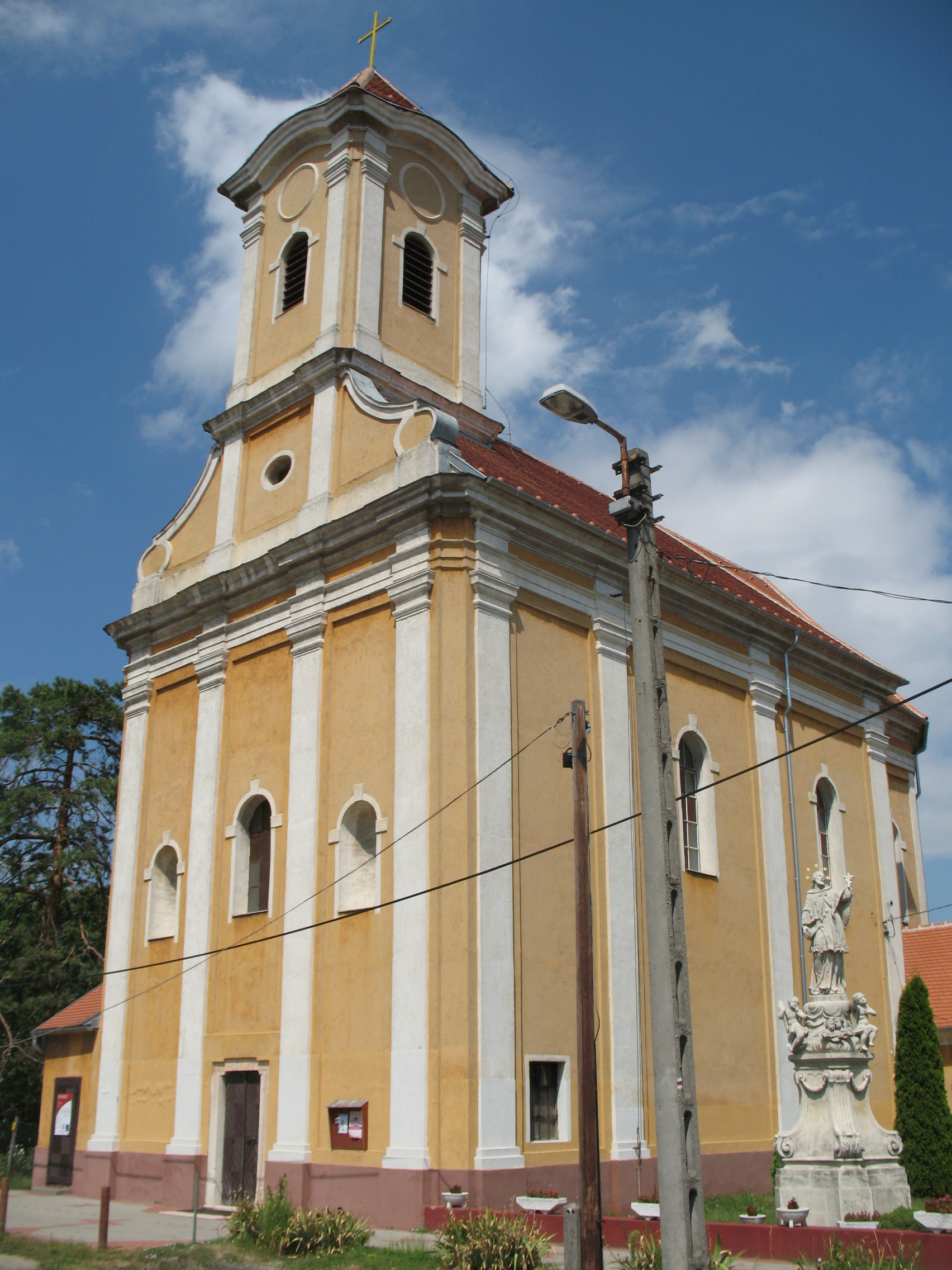

Bakonyszombathely (German: Deutschmarkt) is a village in Komárom-Esztergom county, Hungary.
