= Leányvár =

Leányvár Leinwar
- Location of Komárom-Esztergom county in Hungary

- Location of Leányvár
- Coordinates: 47.68268°N 18.77020°E
- Country: Hungary
- County: Komárom-Esztergom

Area
  - Total: 7.25 km^{2} (2.80 sq mi)

Population (2004)
  - Total: 1,714
  - Density: 236.41/km^{2} (612.3/sq mi)
- Time zone: UTC+1 (CET)
  - Summer (DST): UTC+2 (CEST)
- Postal code: 2518
- Area code: 33

Leányvár (German: Leinwar) is a village in Komárom-Esztergom county, Hungary.
