= Szomor =

- Flag Coat of arms

- Location of Komárom-Esztergom county in Hungary

- Location of Szomor
- Coordinates: 47.59305°N 18.66329°E
- Country: Hungary
- County: Komárom-Esztergom

Area
  - Total: 13.19 km^{2} (5.09 sq mi)

Population (2004)
  - Total: 1,097
  - Density: 83.16/km^{2} (215.4/sq mi)
- Time zone: UTC+1 (CET)
  - Summer (DST): UTC+2 (CEST)
- Postal code: 2822
- Area code: 34

Szomor (German: Somor) is a village in Komárom-Esztergom county, Hungary.
