= Naszály =

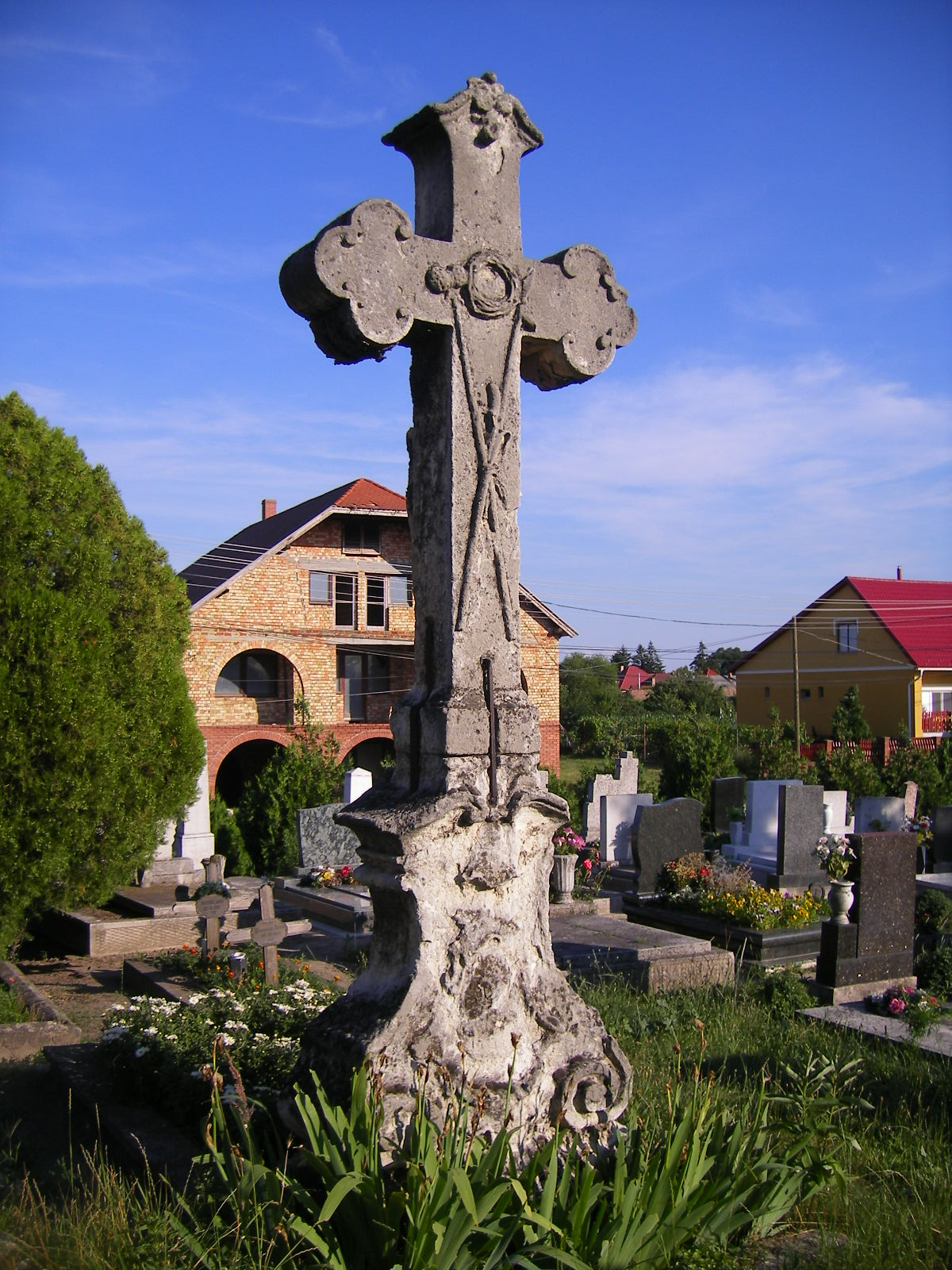

- Coat of arms

- Location of Komárom-Esztergom county in Hungary

- Location of Naszály
- Coordinates: 47.69873°N 18.26075°E
- Country: Hungary
- County: Komárom-Esztergom

Area
  - Total: 30.23 km^{2} (11.67 sq mi)

Population (2004)
  - Total: 2,294
  - Density: 75.88/km^{2} (196.5/sq mi)
- Time zone: UTC+1 (CET)
  - Summer (DST): UTC+2 (CEST)
- Postal code: 2899
- Area code: 34

Naszály is a village in Komárom-Esztergom county, Hungary.
