= Héreg =

- Location of Komárom-Esztergom county in Hungary

- Location of Héreg
- Coordinates: 47.64703°N 18.51064°E
- Country: Hungary
- County: Komárom-Esztergom

Area
  - Total: 27.13 km^{2} (10.47 sq mi)

Population (2004)
  - Total: 1,031
  - Density: 38/km^{2} (98/sq mi)
- Time zone: UTC+1 (CET)
  - Summer (DST): UTC+2 (CEST)
- Postal code: 2832
- Area code: 34

Héreg is a village in Komárom-Esztergom county, Hungary.
