= Komárom-Esztergom County =

County of Hungary

Coordinates: 47°35′N 18°20′E

Komárom-Esztergom County Komárom-Esztergom megye
- Counties of Hungary
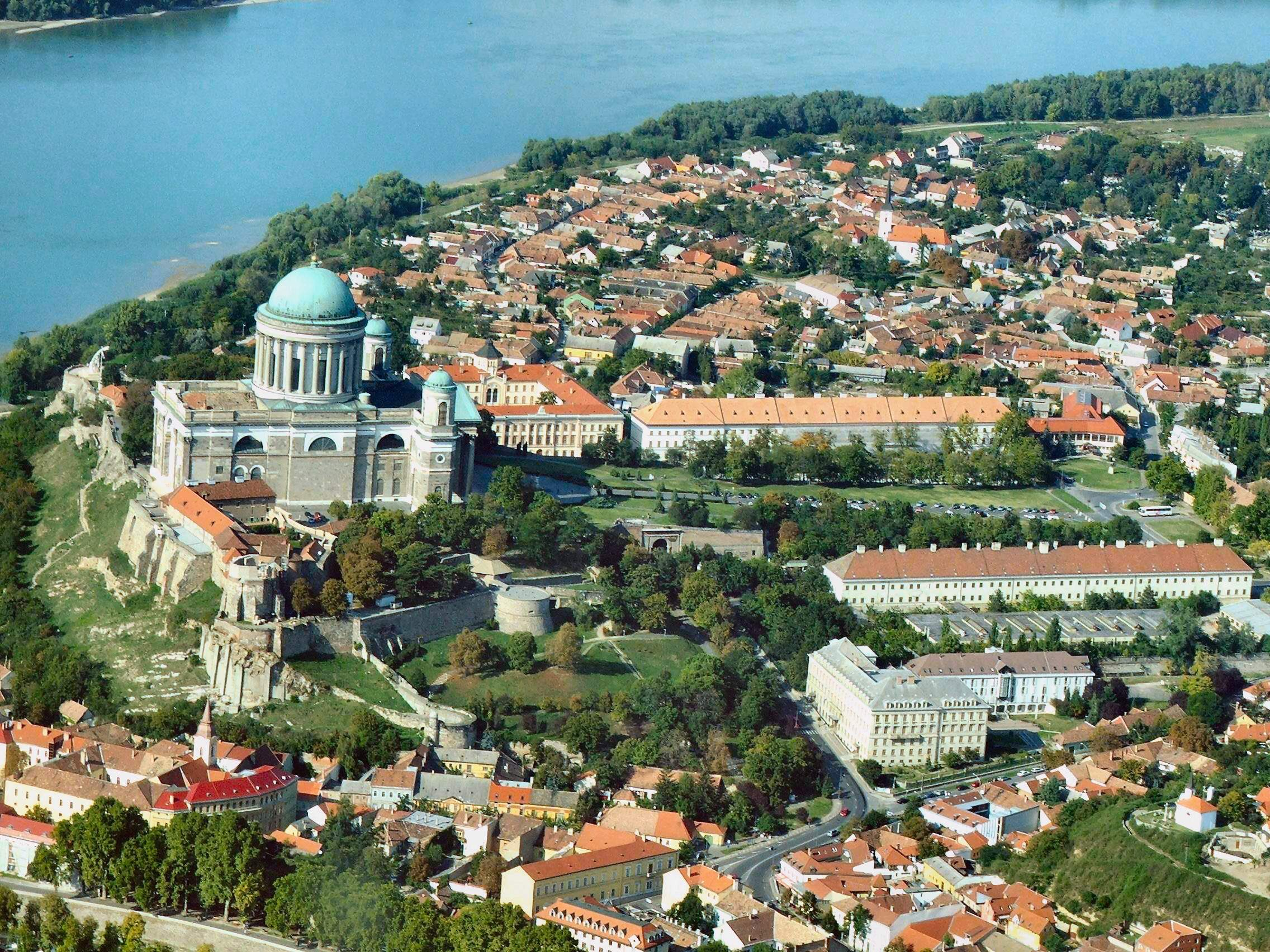
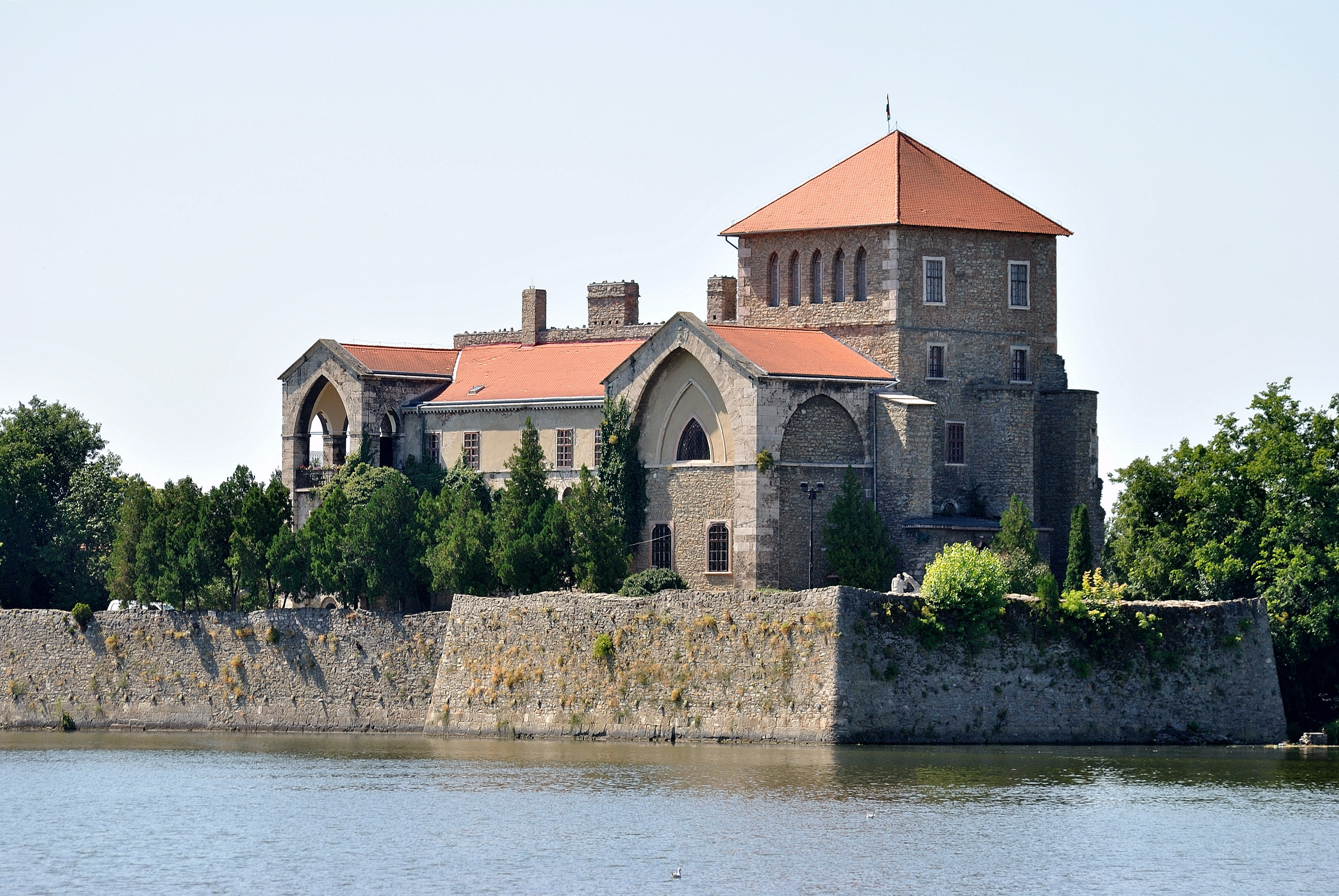
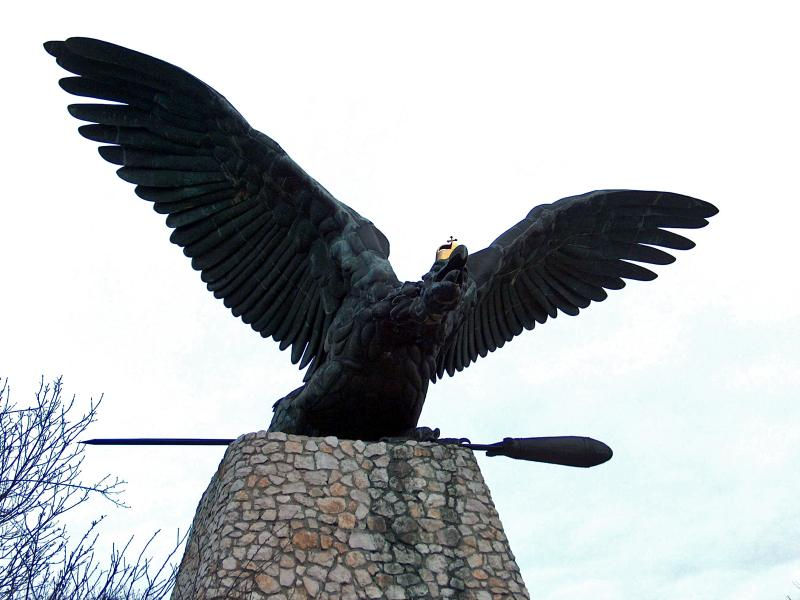
- Descending, from top: Esztergom Castle Hill with the Basilica, Tata Castle, and the Turul Monument in Tatabánya

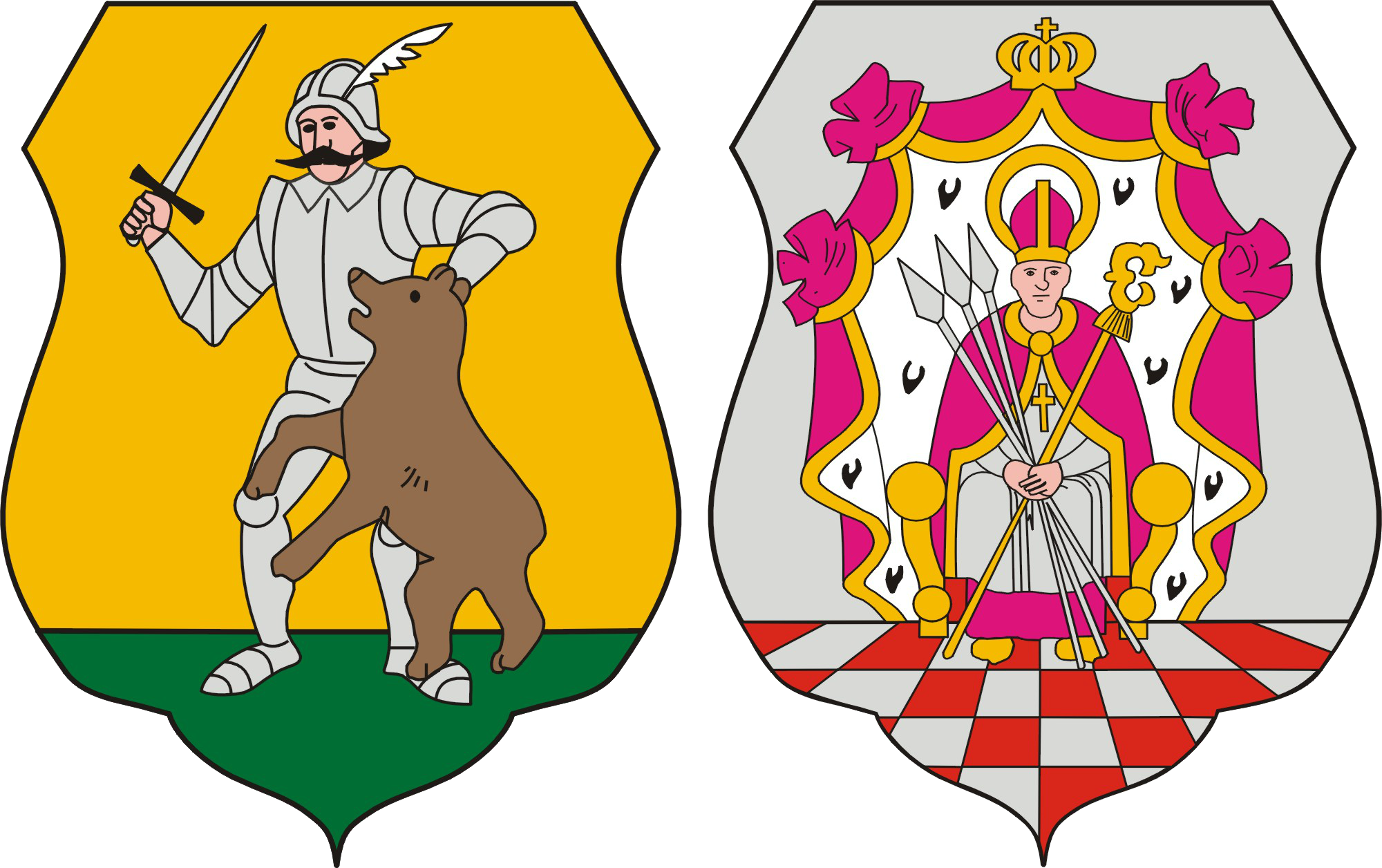
- Flag Coat of arms

- Komárom-Esztergom County within Hungary
- Country: Hungary
- Region: Central Transdanubia
- County seat: Tatabánya
- Districts: 6 districts: Esztergom District; Kisbér District; Komárom District; Oroszlány District; Tatabánya District; Tata District

Government
  - President of the General Assembly: György Popovics (Fidesz-KDNP)

Area
  - Total: 2,264.52 km^{2} (874.34 sq mi)
  - Rank: 19th in Hungary

Population (2018)
  - Total: 297,454
  - Rank: 15th in Hungary
  - Density: 131.354/km^{2} (340.206/sq mi)

GDP
  - Total: HUF 1,117 billion €3.586 billion (2016)
- Postal code: 2027 – 2028, 2067, 25xx, 28xx – 29xx
- Area code(s): (+36) 33, 34
- ISO 3166 code: HU-KE
- Website: kemoh.hu

Komárom-Esztergom (Hungarian: Komárom-Esztergom megye, pronounced [ˈkomaːrom ˈɛstɛrɡom]; German: Burgkomitat Komorn-Gran; Slovak: Komárňansko-ostrihomská župa) is an administrative Hungarian county in Central Transdanubia Region; its shares its northern border the Danube with Slovakia. It shares borders with the Hungarian counties of Győr–Moson–Sopron, Veszprém, Fejér and Pest and the Slovak Nitra Region (Nové Zámky District, Komárno District). Its county seat is Tatabánya.

== History ==
=== Middle Ages ===
The predecessor of Komárom Esztergom County, Komárom county and Esztergom county were founded by Stephen I of Hungary. Both counties had parts that now belong to Slovakia. Throughout their history the borders of the two counties were frequently modified, and they were merged several times as well. When the castle of Esztergom was captured by the Ottomans in 1543, the leadership of the county fled from there. The castles of Érsekújvár, Komárom, and Tata were the three border castles stopping the Ottoman conquest for long decades. During the Ottoman occupation of Hungary, Esztergom became the center of a sanjak spanning across several counties. Komárom county on the other hand was continuously functioning, its castle was never captured by the conquering armies. The general assembly of nobles in Esztergom county was reintroduced after the liberation of the city from the Ottomans, by armies led by John III Sobieski in 1696. The assembly was dissolved in both counties during Rákóczi's War of Independence, and then it was reformed after the war, in Esztergom county in 1710 and in Komárom county in 1712.

Esztergom county was one of the two counties in which the leadership consisted of common nobles and not religious and political leaders (the other one being Pest-Pilis-Solt-Kiskun county). They were not granted the rank of lord-lieutenant unlike the leaders of other counties; they could only acquire vice-ispán and other lower ranks. The two counties were first merged in 1786 by Joseph II, with the new center being Tata. The merged county was separated after his death in 1790, and both Esztergom and Komárom were granted the rank of county center. The noble leadership was replaced by county commissions in both counties in May 1848. The county commission of Komárom county functioned until the end of the war of independence of 1848-1849, but the commission of Esztergom county was disrupted by the occupation of imperial troops on 15 January 1849. After the war the leadership of the counties was headed by Imperial–royal commissioners. In 1851 the parts of the counties that lay on the southern bank of the Danube were reorganized as Esztergom county with Esztergom as its center, and the parts on the northern bank were reorganized as Komárom county with Komárom as its center. These reformed counties only existed until 1860. After that the county commissions elected in 1848 restored them to their previous state. Towards the end of the 19th century, two towns in Komárom county — Lábatlan and Piszke — were added to Esztergom county, during the reorganization of counties in 1876.

=== 20th century ===
In January 1919 the Czechoslovak Legion occupied the towns of Párkány and Komárom on the northern bank of the Danube. The workers' council and directory of Esztergom county were formed in its county center, while the directory of Komárom county was formed in New Komárom on the southern bank of the Danube.

After the Treaty of Trianon the northern parts of the two counties became parts of Czechoslovakia. After the treaty 44 villages from the former Komárom county and 22 towns from the former Esztergom county stayed in Hungary. In 1923 the two counties were merged under the name "Administratively pre-merged county of Komárom and Esztergom". After the First Vienna Award in 1938, the two counties were restored to their former size. The size of Komárom county also increased significantly because the area of Csallóköz, which previously belonged to Pozsony county, was also added to it, so it consisted of six districts now, as opposed to the previous four.

As a consequence of the temporary armistice following World War II the 1937 borders of the country were restored. Due to this a temporary administrative reorganization was conducted, where the previous Komárom and Esztergom counties were now merged for a last time under the name Komárom-Esztergom county.

== Demographics ==
Religion in Komárom-Esztergom County (2022 census – of those who declared their religion (57.0%))
1. Roman Catholic (44.6%)
2. Calvinistic (15.0%)
3. Lutheran (2.00%)
4. Greek Catholic (0.90%)
5. Other Christian denomination (3.30%)
6. Other religions (0.50%)
7. Not religious (33.7%)

In 2015, it had a population of 299,110 and the population density was 132/km^{2}.

Year	County population	Change
1949	220,914	n/a
1960	▲270,810	22.59%
1970	▲304,461	12.43%
1980	▲322,893 (record)	6.05%
1990	▼316,984	-1.83%
2001	▼316,590	-0.12%
2011	▼304,568	-3.80%
2015	▼299,110	-1.82%
2018	▼297,454	-0.55%

=== Ethnicity ===
Hungarians constitute the majority of the population. The chief minorities are ethnic Germans (approx. 9,000), Roma (4,000) and Slovaks (3,000).

Total population (2011 census): 304,568
Ethnic groups (2011 census): Identified themselves: 270 933 persons:

- Hungarians: 252 432 (93.13%)
- Germans: 9 168 (3.38%)
- Gypsies: 4 261 (1.57%)
- Slovaks: 3 174 (1.17%)
- Others and indefinable: 1 898 (0.70%)

Approx. 48,000 persons in Komárom-Esztergom County did not declare an ethnic group at the 2011 census.

=== Religion ===
Religious adherence in the county according to 2011 census:

- Catholic – 111,919 (Roman Catholic – 110,656; Greek Catholic – 1,227);
- Reformed – 30,517;
- Evangelical – 4,505;
- other religions – 4,101;
- Non-religious – 61,384;
- Atheism – 4,262;
- Undeclared – 87,880.

== Regional structure ==
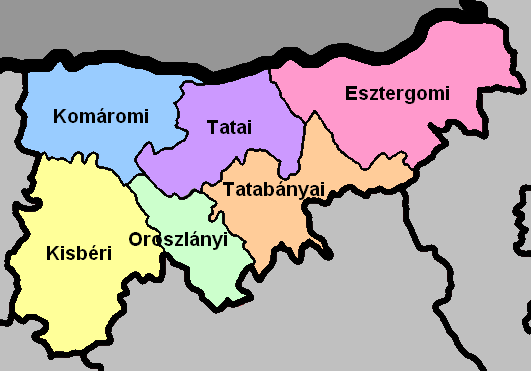
Districts of Komárom-Esztergom County

No.	English and Hungarian names	Area (km^{2})	Population (2011)	Density (pop./km^{2})	Seat	No. of municipalities
1	Esztergom District; Esztergomi járás	537.26	93,784	175	Esztergom	24
2	Kisbér District; Kisbéri járás	510.55	20,284	40	Kisbér	17
3	Komárom District; Komáromi járás	378.78	39,863	105	Komárom	9
4	Oroszlány District; Oroszlányi járás	199.39	26,163	131	Oroszlány	6
5	Tatabánya District; Tatabányai járás	331.65	85,691	258	Tatabánya	10
6	Tata District; Tatai járás	306.71	38,783	126	Tata	10
Komárom-Esztergom County		2,264.52	304,568	130	Tatabánya	76

== Politics ==
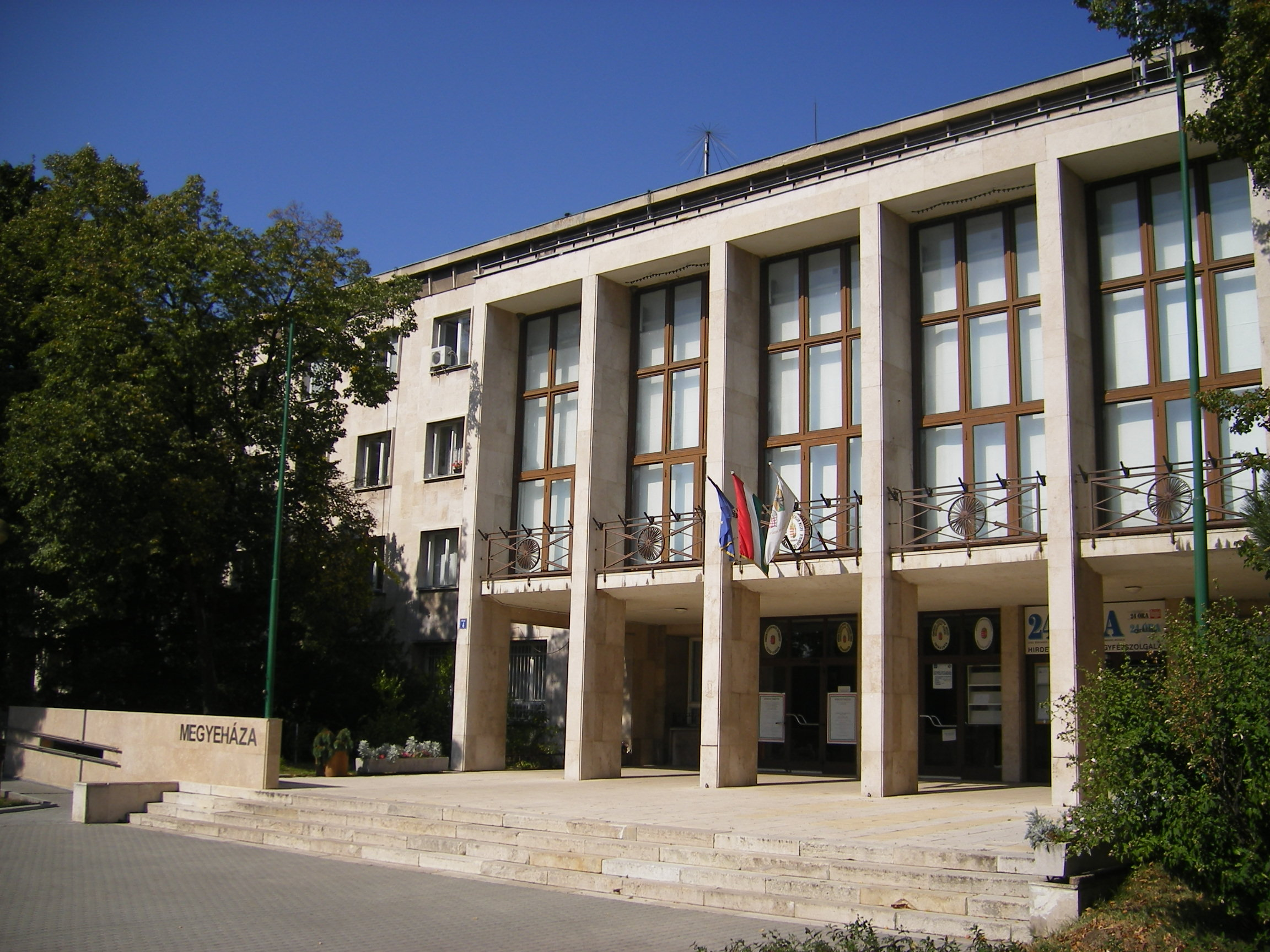
Countyhall of Komárom-Esztergom.

The Komárom-Esztergom County Council, elected at the 2024 local government elections, is made up of 15 counselors, with the following party composition:

Party	Seats	Current County Assembly
Fidesz-KDNP	8	
Our Homeland Movement	2	
Democratic Coalition	2	
Momentum Movement	2	
KEM	1	

=== Presidents of the General Assembly ===
List of presidents since 1990
György Popovics (Fidesz-KDNP)	2014–

== Municipalities ==
Komárom-Esztergom County has 2 urban counties, 10 towns, 3 large villages and 61 villages.

The county is ranked second in terms of population density among counties in Hungary: 66% of people live in towns.

Cities with county rights

(ordered by population, as of 2011 census)

- Tatabánya (67,753) – county seat
- Esztergom (28,926)

Towns

- Tata (23,575)
- Komárom (19,284)
- Oroszlány (18,446)
- Dorog (12,199)
- Nyergesújfalu (7,621)
- Ács (6,875)
- Kisbér (5,564)
- Tát (5,302)
- Lábatlan (5,033)
- Bábolna (3,808)

Villages

- Aka
- Almásfüzitő
- Annavölgy
- Ácsteszér
- Ászár
- Baj
- Bajna
- Bajót
- Bakonybánk
- Bakonysárkány
- Bakonyszombathely
- Bana
- Bársonyos
- Bokod
- Csatka
- Császár
- Csém
- Csép
- Csolnok
- Dad
- Dág
- Dömös
- Dunaalmás
- Dunaszentmiklós
- Epöl
- Ete
- Gyermely
- Héreg
- Kecskéd
- Kerékteleki
- Kesztölc
- Kisigmánd
- Kocs
- Kömlőd
- Környe
- Leányvár
- Máriahalom
- Mocsa
- Mogyorósbánya
- Nagyigmánd
- Nagysáp
- Naszály
- Neszmély
- Piliscsév
- Pilismarót
- Réde
- Sárisáp
- Süttő
- Súr
- Szákszend
- Szárliget
- Szomód
- Szomor
- Tardos
- Tarján
- Tárkány
- Tokod
- Tokodaltáró
- Úny
- Várgesztes
- Vérteskethely
- Vértessomló
- Vértesszőlős
- Vértestolna

municipalities are large villages.

== Gallery ==
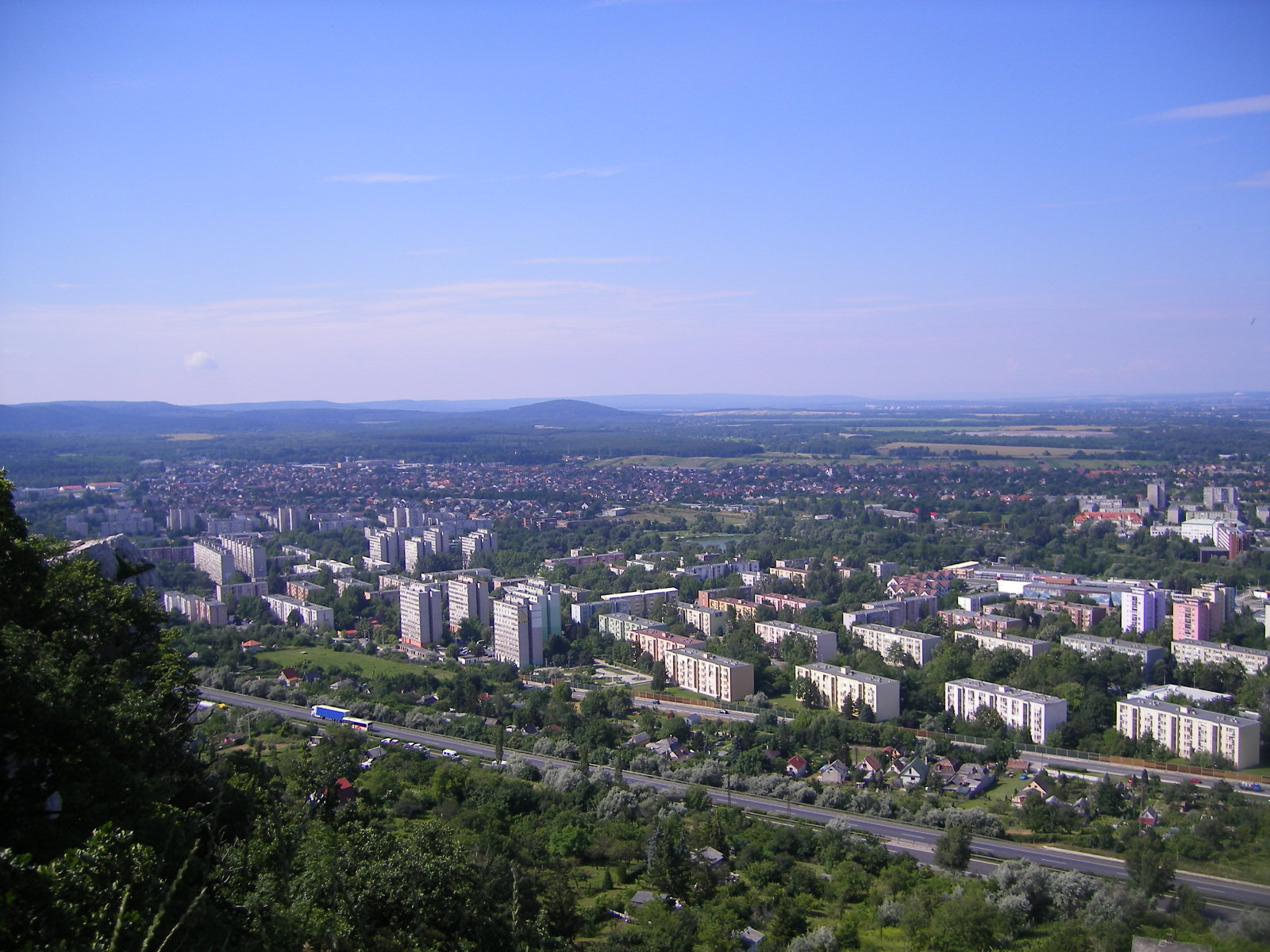
Tatabánya, the capital of the county

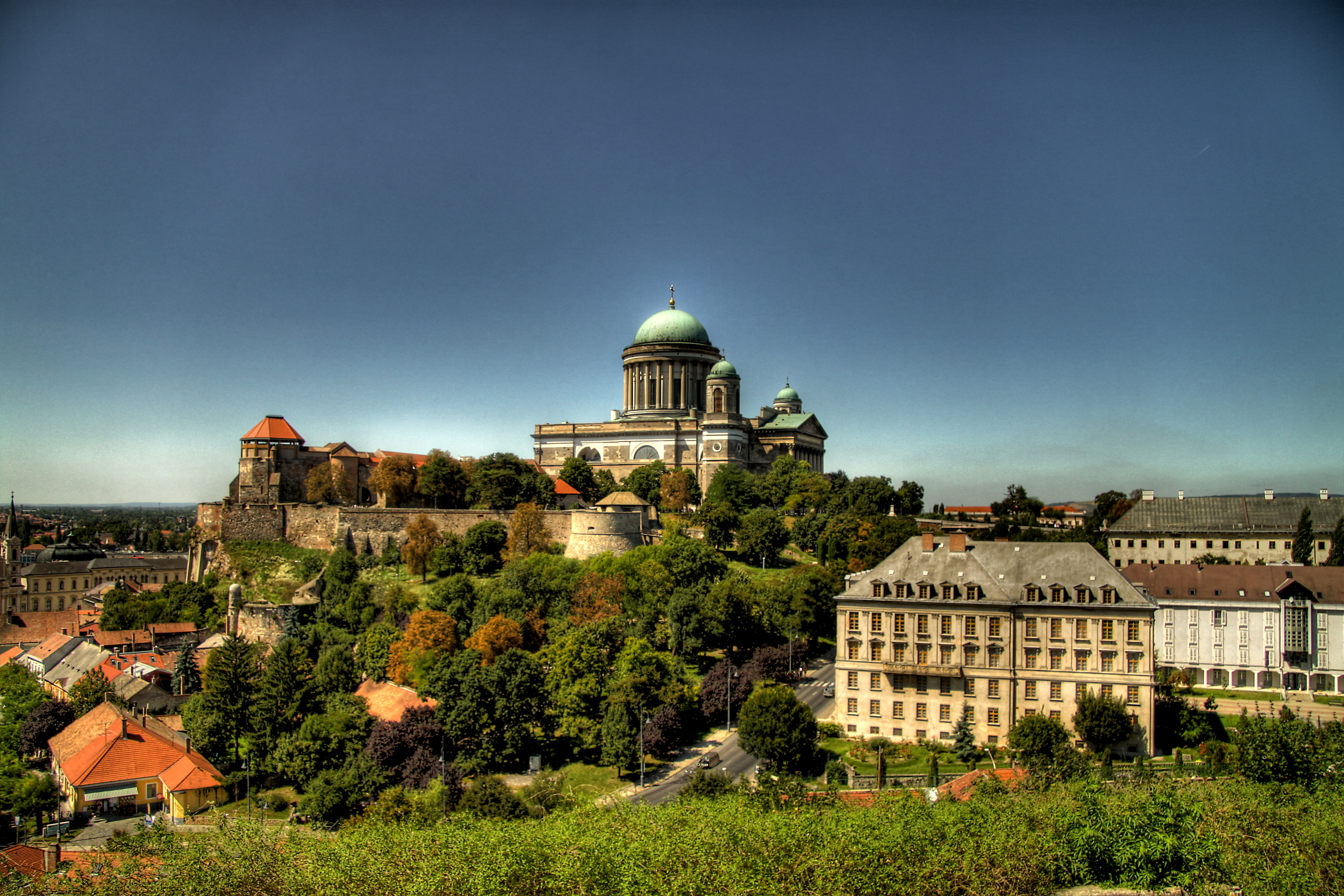
Esztergom, the Hungarian Rome

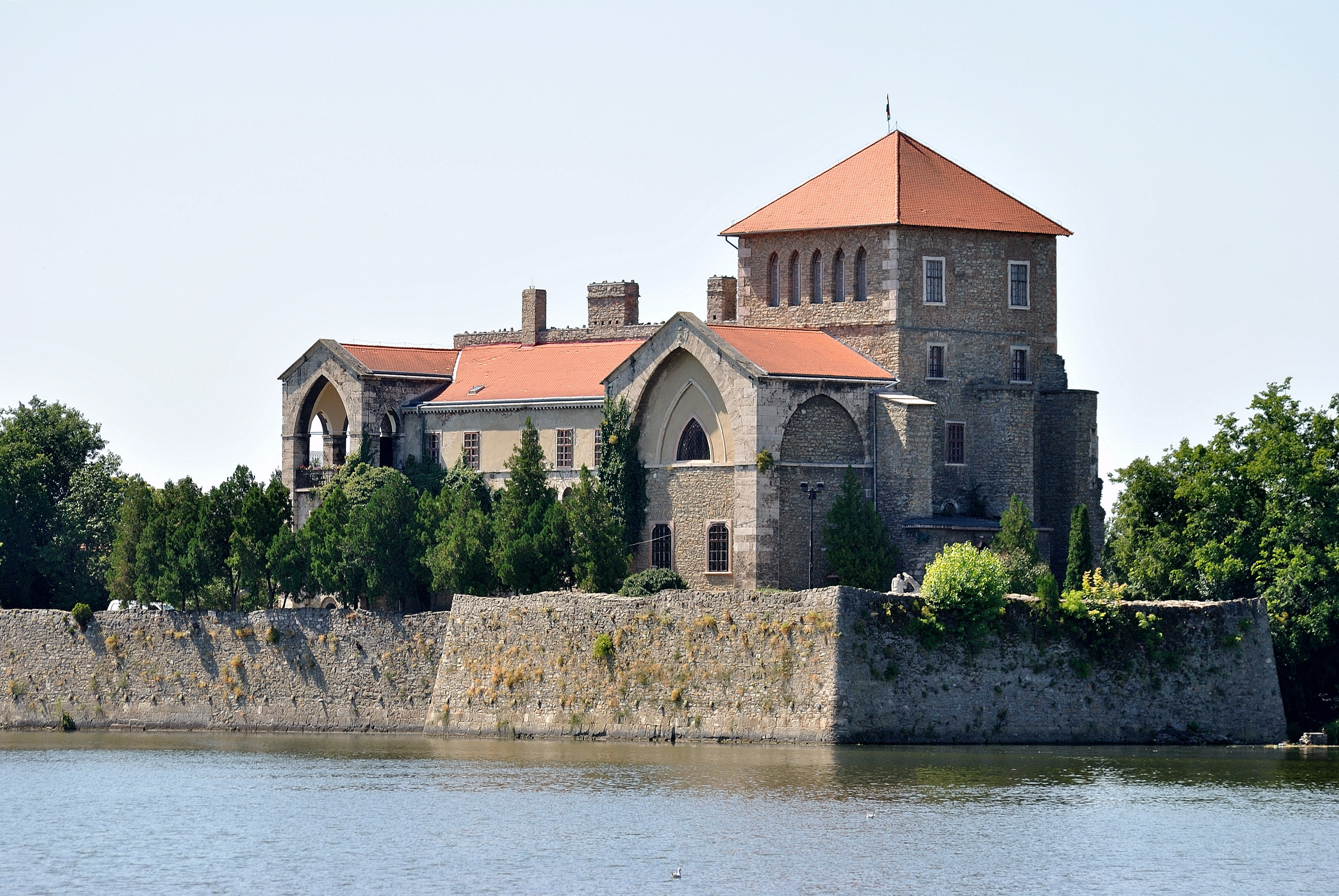
Tata Castle

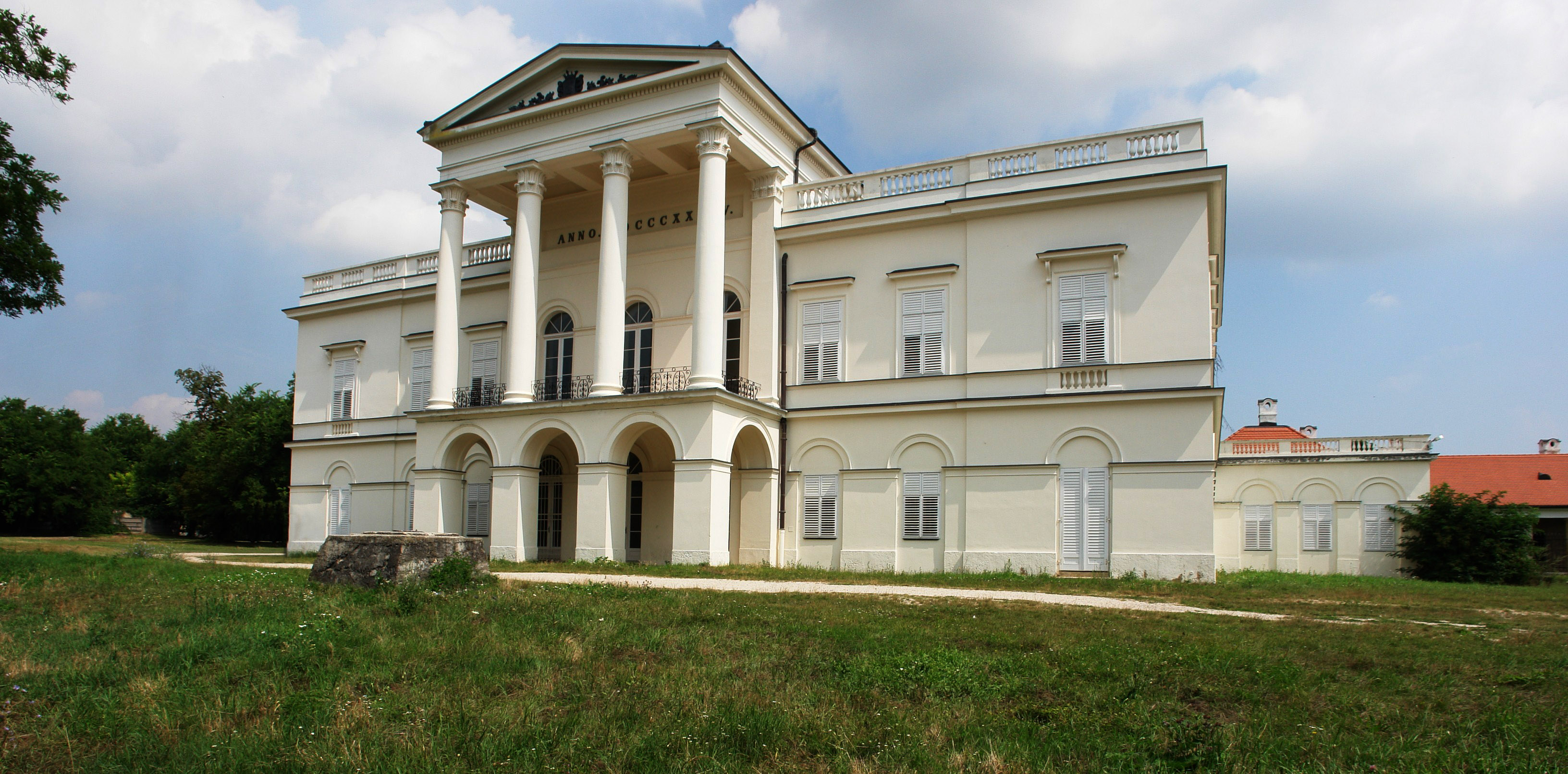
Sándor-Metternich Mansion in Bajna

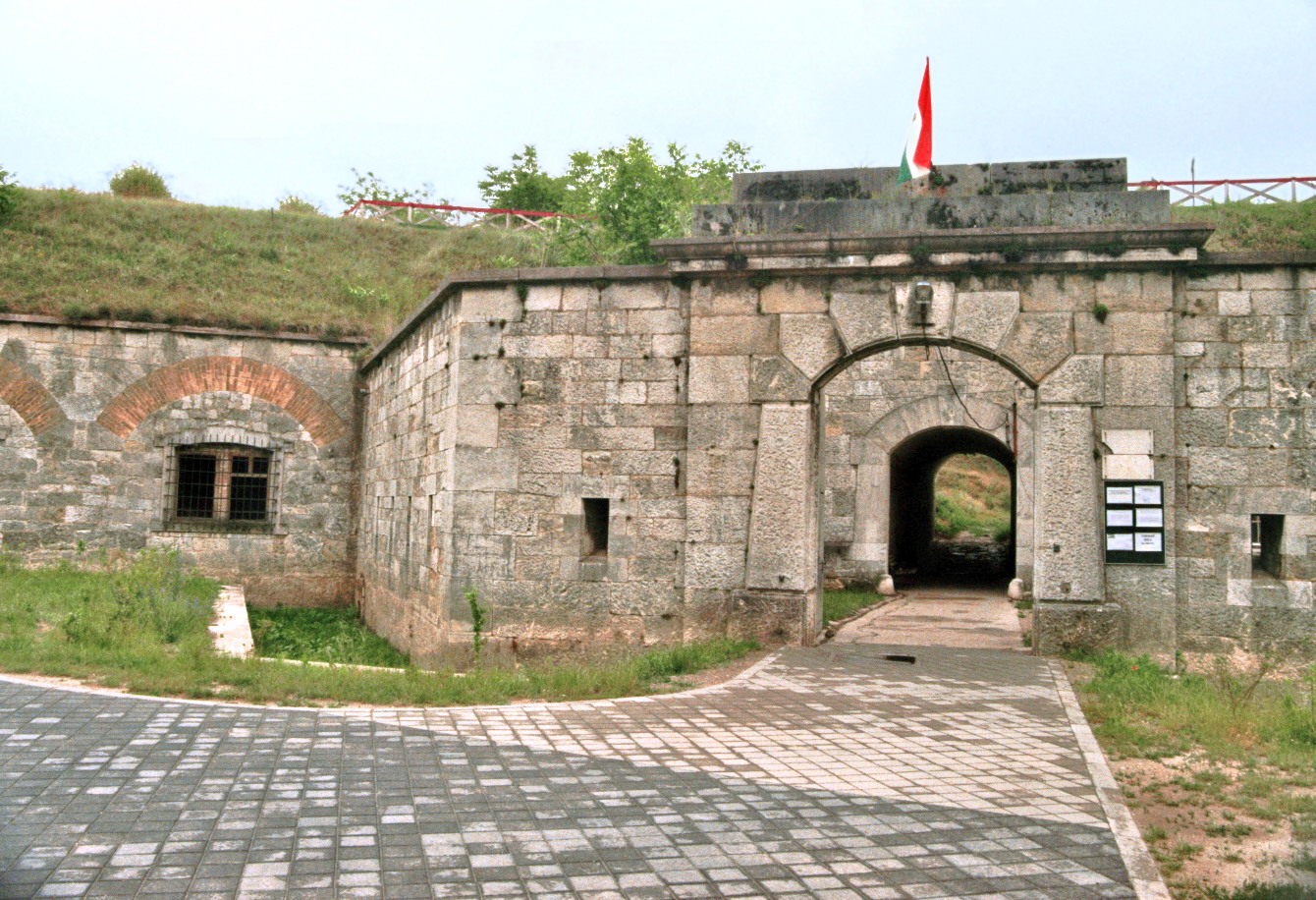
Fortresses in Komárom

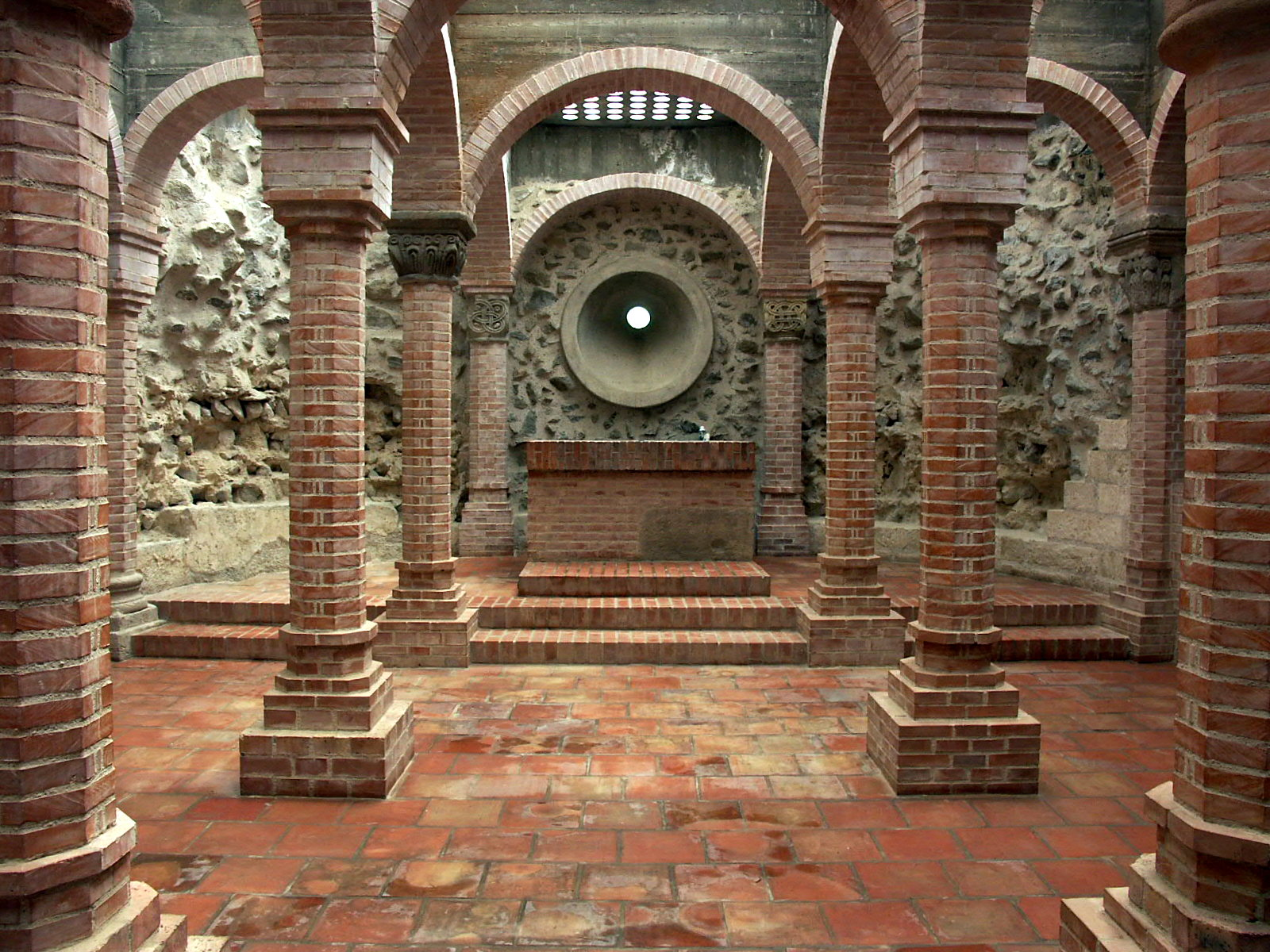
Ruin of monastery in Dömös

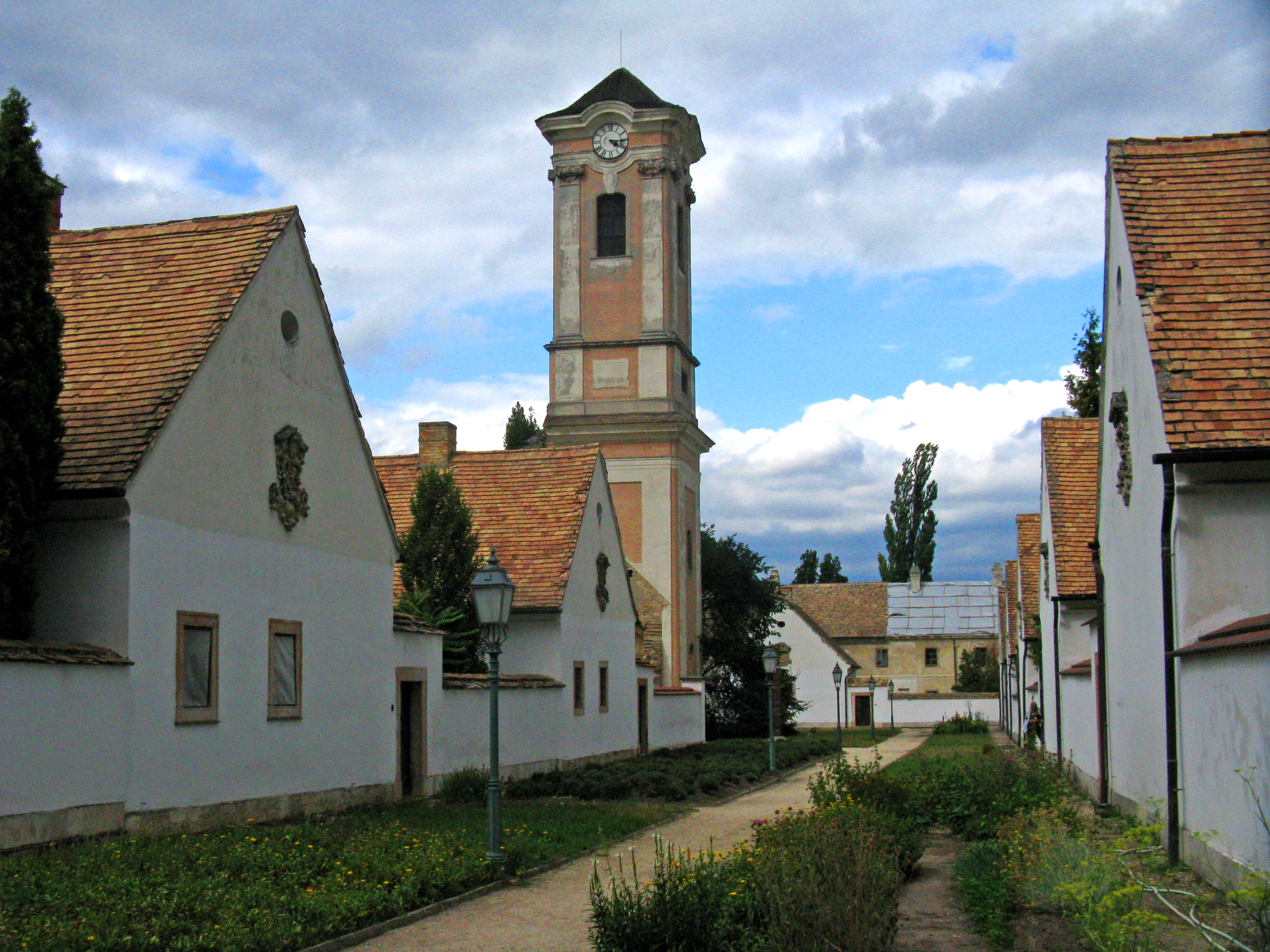
Oroszlány, former Camaldolese monastery

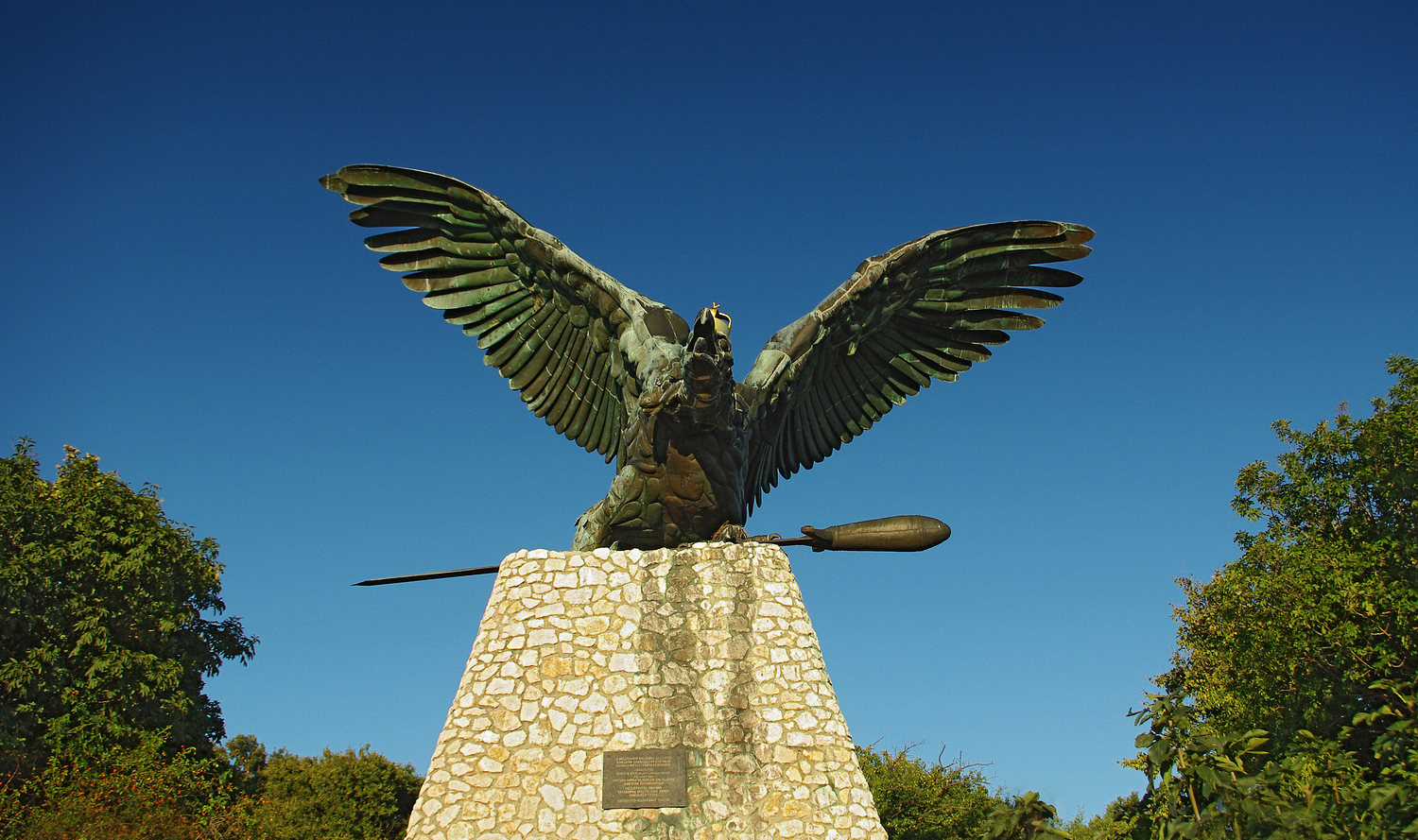
Turul Monument at Bánhida
