= Annavölgy =

- Location of Komárom-Esztergom county in Hungary
- Country: Hungary
- County: Komárom-Esztergom

Area
  - Total: 4.6 km^{2} (1.8 sq mi)

Population (2004)
  - Total: 969
  - Density: 210.65/km^{2} (545.6/sq mi)
- Time zone: UTC+1 (CET)
  - Summer (DST): UTC+2 (CEST)
- Postal code: 2529
- Area code: 33

Annavölgy is a village in Komárom-Esztergom county, Hungary.
