= Vértestolna =

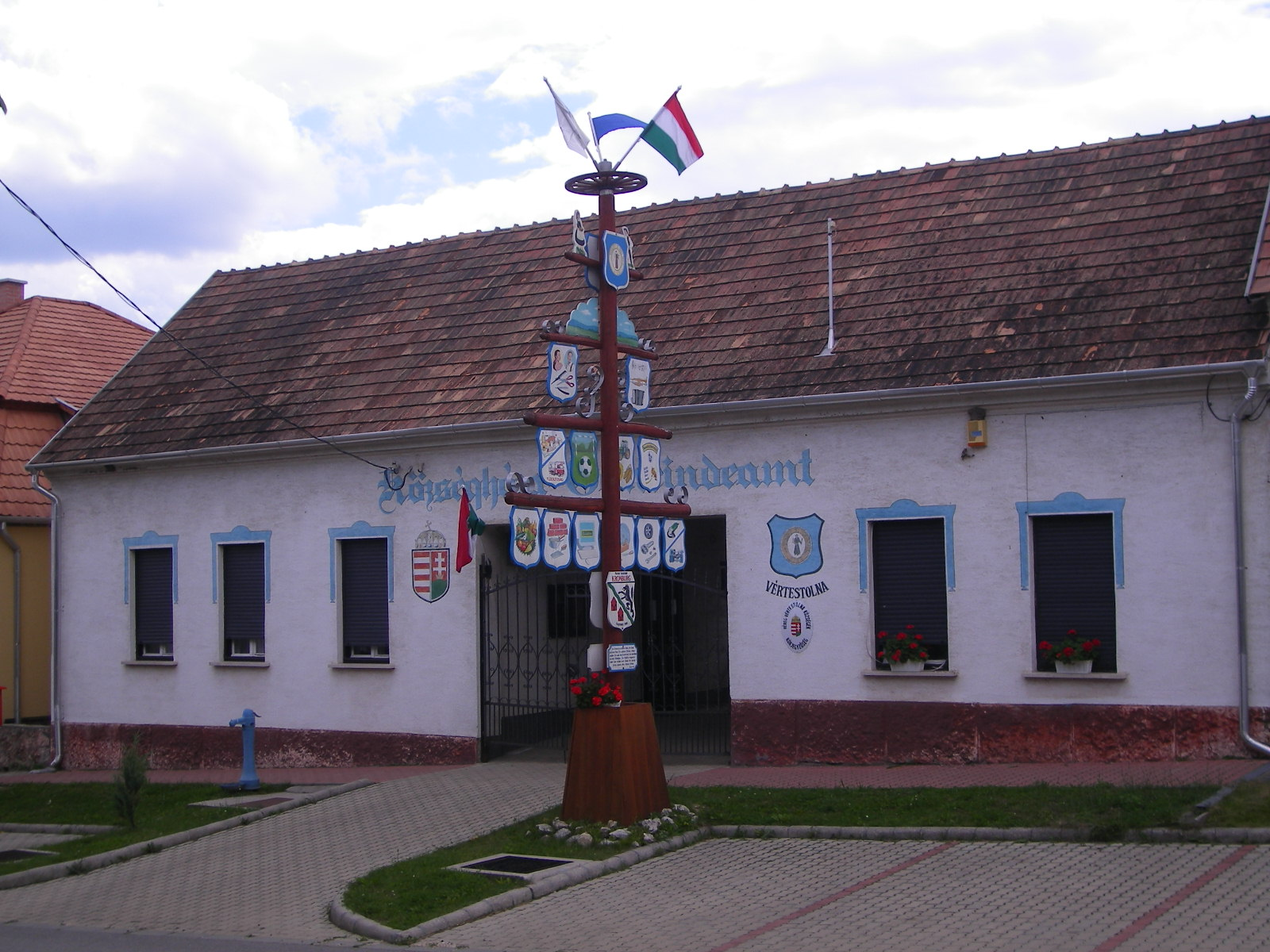
- Village hall

- Location of Vértestolna
- Coordinates: 47.62839°N 18.45644°E
- Country: Hungary
- County: Komárom-Esztergom

Area
  - Total: 16.95 km^{2} (6.54 sq mi)

Population (2004)
  - Total: 528
  - Density: 31.15/km^{2} (80.7/sq mi)
- Time zone: UTC+1 (CET)
  - Summer (DST): UTC+2 (CEST)
- Postal code: 2833
- Area code: 34

Vértestolna (German: Tolnau) is a village in Komárom-Esztergom county, Hungary.
