= Epöl =

- Flag Coat of arms

- Location of Komárom-Esztergom county in Hungary

- Location of Epöl
- Coordinates: 47.64708°N 18.63558°E
- Country: Hungary
- County: Komárom-Esztergom

Area
  - Total: 12.52 km^{2} (4.83 sq mi)

Population (2004)
  - Total: 657
  - Density: 52.47/km^{2} (135.9/sq mi)
- Time zone: UTC+1 (CET)
  - Summer (DST): UTC+2 (CEST)
- Postal code: 2526
- Area code: 33

Epöl is a village in Komárom-Esztergom county, Hungary.
