= Máriahalom =

Máriahalom Kirwa
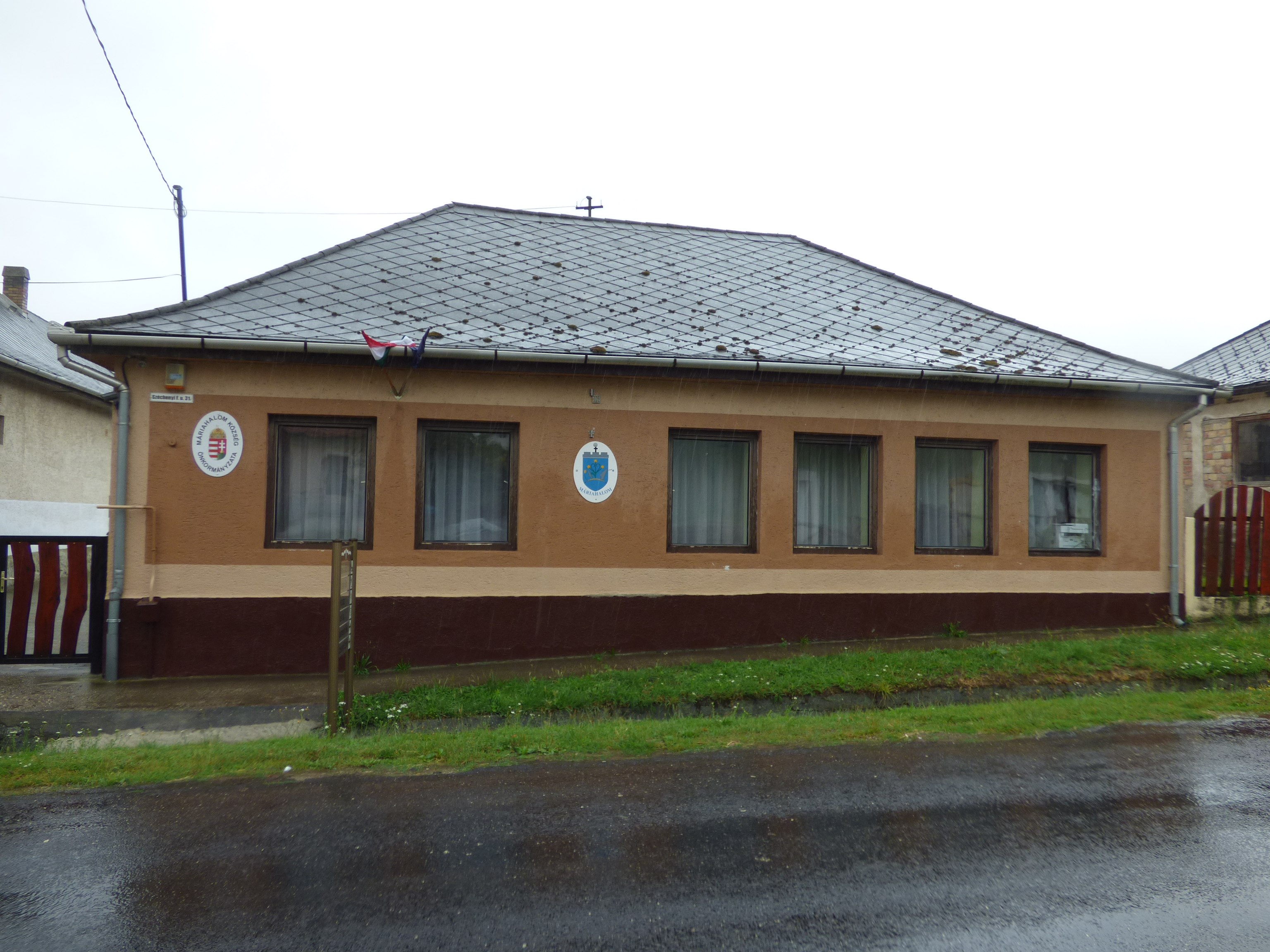
- Máriahalom Mayor's Office

- Location of Komárom-Esztergom county in Hungary

- Location of Máriahalom
- Coordinates: 47.62747°N 18.70760°E
- Country: Hungary
- County: Komárom-Esztergom

Area
  - Total: 10.85 km^{2} (4.19 sq mi)

Population (2004)
  - Total: 663
  - Density: 61.1/km^{2} (158/sq mi)
- Time zone: UTC+1 (CET)
  - Summer (DST): UTC+2 (CEST)
- Postal code: 2527
- Area code: 33

Máriahalom (German: Kirwa or Kirwall) is a village in Komárom-Esztergom county, Hungary. It is around 30 km (19 mi) north-west of Budapest.
