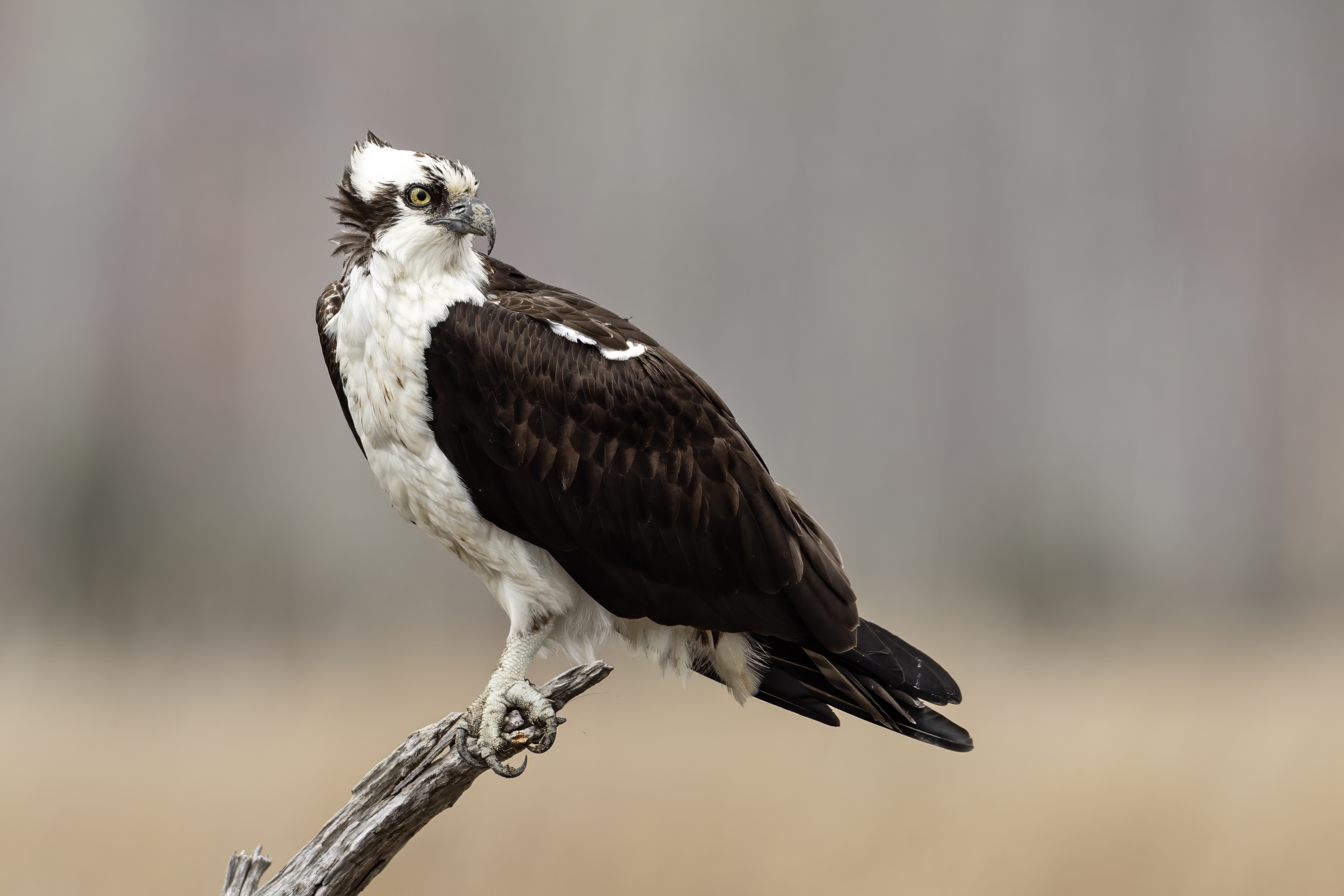
- American osprey (P. h. carolinensis) standing on a snag

Conservation status
- Least Concern (IUCN 3.1)

Scientific classification
- Kingdom: Animalia
- Phylum: Chordata
- Class: Aves
- Order: Accipitriformes
- Family: Pandionidae
- Genus: Pandion
- Species: P. haliaetus

Binomial name
- Pandion haliaetus (Linnaeus, 1758)
- global range

Synonyms
- Falco haliaetus Linnaeus, 1758

Audio
- Call

= Osprey =

Species of bird

The osprey (Pandion haliaetus; /ˈɒspri, -preɪ/), historically known as sea hawk, river hawk, and fish hawk, is a diurnal, fish-eating bird of prey with a cosmopolitan range. It is a large raptor, reaching more than 60 cm (24 in) in length and a wingspan of 180 cm (71 in). It is brown on the upperparts and predominantly greyish on the head and underparts.

The osprey is distributed on all continents except Antarctica, but in South America, it occurs only as a nonbreeding migrant. It lives in a wide variety of habitats and nests in locations near a body of water providing an adequate food supply. It has specialised physical characteristics and unique behaviour in hunting its prey, which consists almost exclusively of fish.

== Taxonomy ==
The osprey was described in 1758 by Carl Linnaeus under the name Falco haliaetus in his 10th edition of Systema Naturae. Linnaeus specified the type locality as Europe, but in 1761, he restricted the locality to Sweden.

The osprey is the only extant species placed in the genus Pandion that was introduced by French zoologist Marie Jules César Savigny in 1809. The genus is the sole member of the family Pandionidae. The species has always presented a riddle to taxonomists, but here it is treated as the sole living member of the family Pandionidae, and the family listed in its traditional place as part of the order Accipitriformes. Other schemes place it alongside the hawks and eagles in the family Accipitridae. The Sibley-Ahlquist taxonomy has placed it together with the other diurnal raptors in a greatly enlarged Ciconiiformes, but this results in an unnatural paraphyletic classification. Molecular phylogenetic analysis revealed that the family Pandionidae is a sister taxon of the family Accipitridae. The two families diverged an estimated 50.8 million years ago.

The osprey is unusual in that it is a sole living species that occurs nearly worldwide. Even the few subspecies are not unequivocally separable. Generally, four subspecies are recognised, although differences are small, and ITIS lists only the first three.

- P. h. carolinensis (Gmelin, 1788)– the American or North American osprey occurs from Alaska and Canada to much of Central and South America, except Chile and Patagonia. It is larger and has a darker body and paler breast than the European osprey.
- P. h. cristatus (Vieillot, 1816) – the Australasian osprey is the smallest and most distinctive subspecies that occurs along the entire marine coastline of Australia and some larger freshwater rivers as well as in Tasmania. It is not migratory. Some authorities have assigned it full species-status as Pandion cristatus, also known as the eastern osprey.
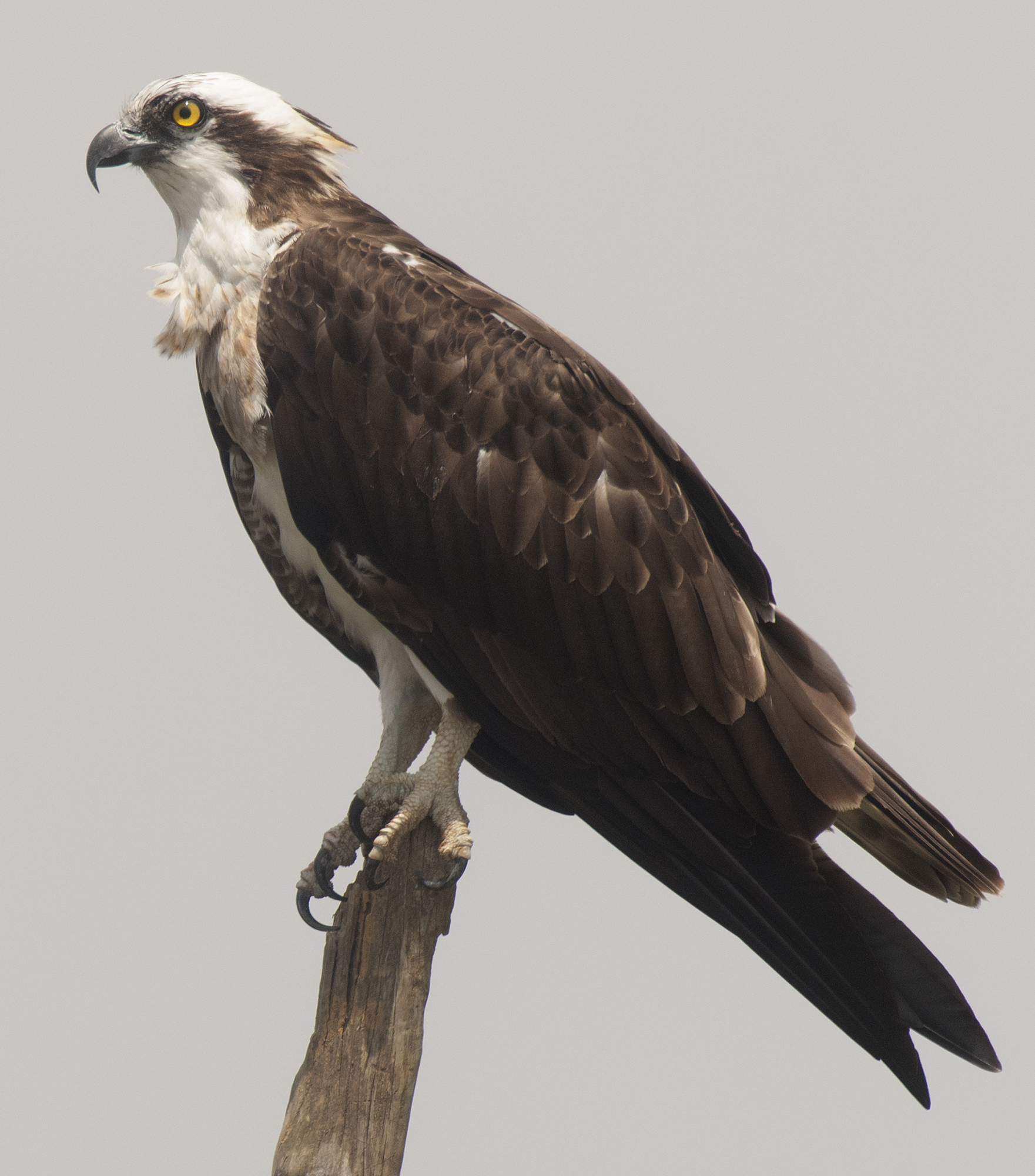
Eurasian osprey
(P. h. haliaetus),
in India

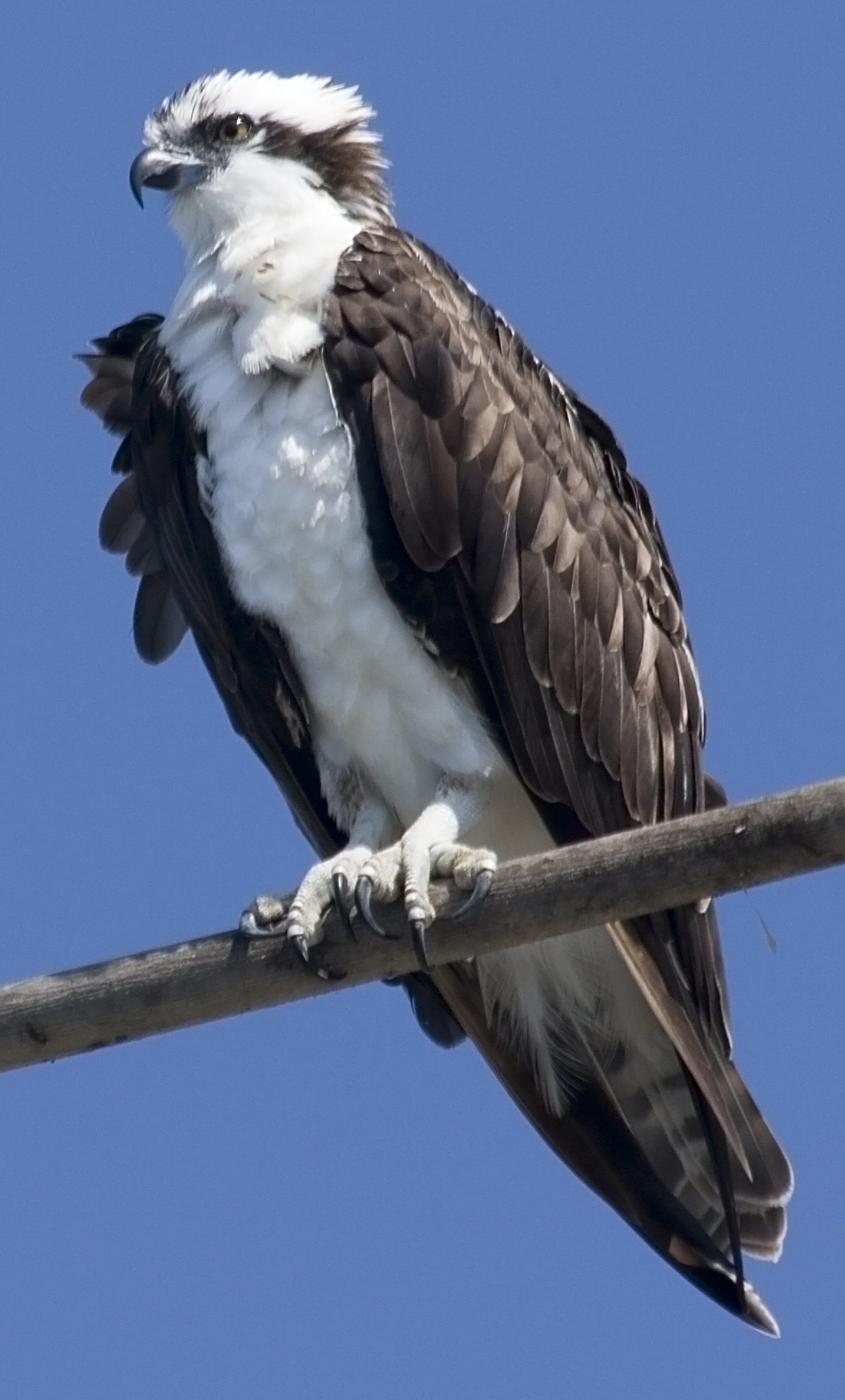
American osprey
(P. h. carolinensis),
in the USA

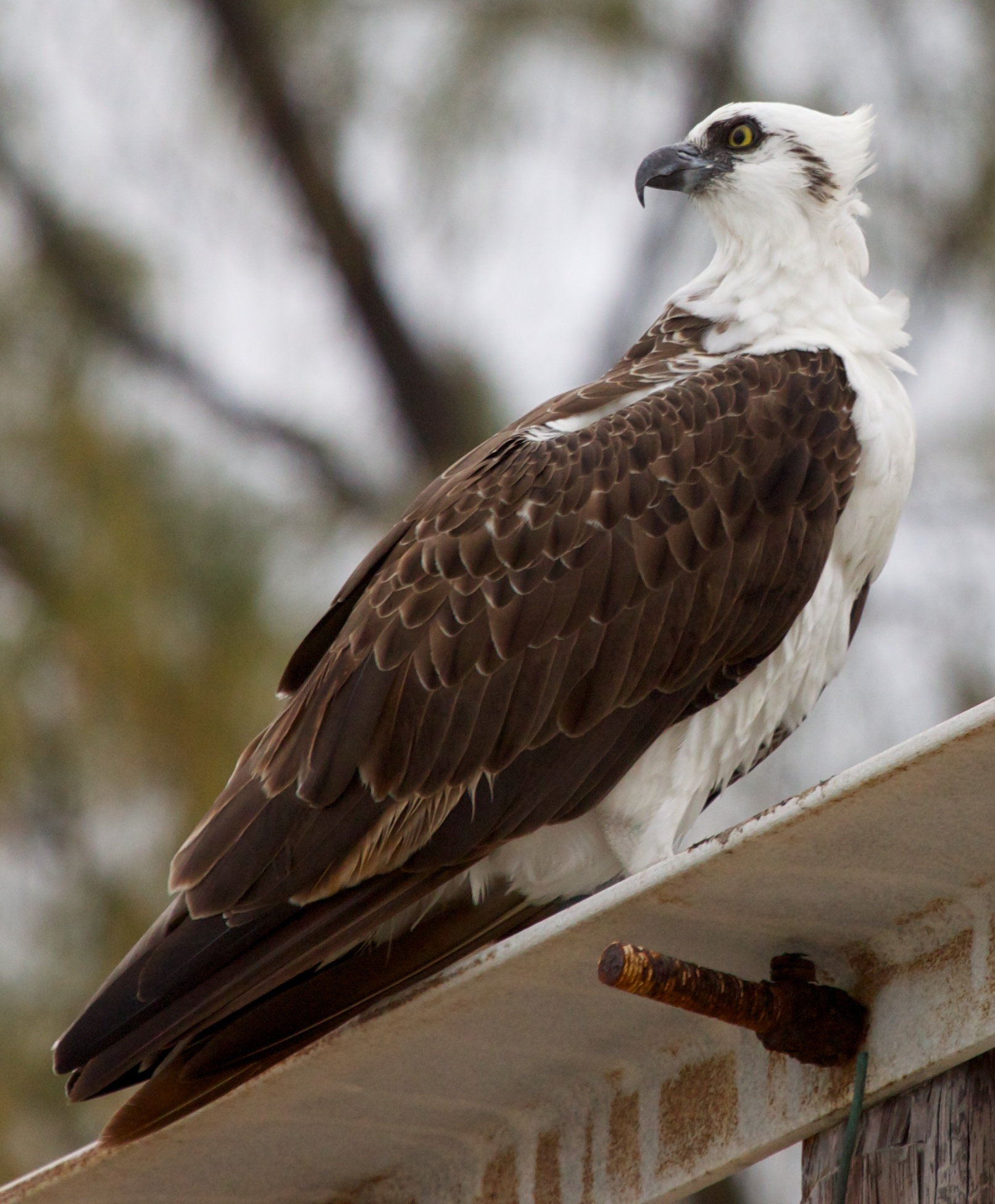
Caribbean osprey
(P. h. ridgwayi),
in the Bahamas

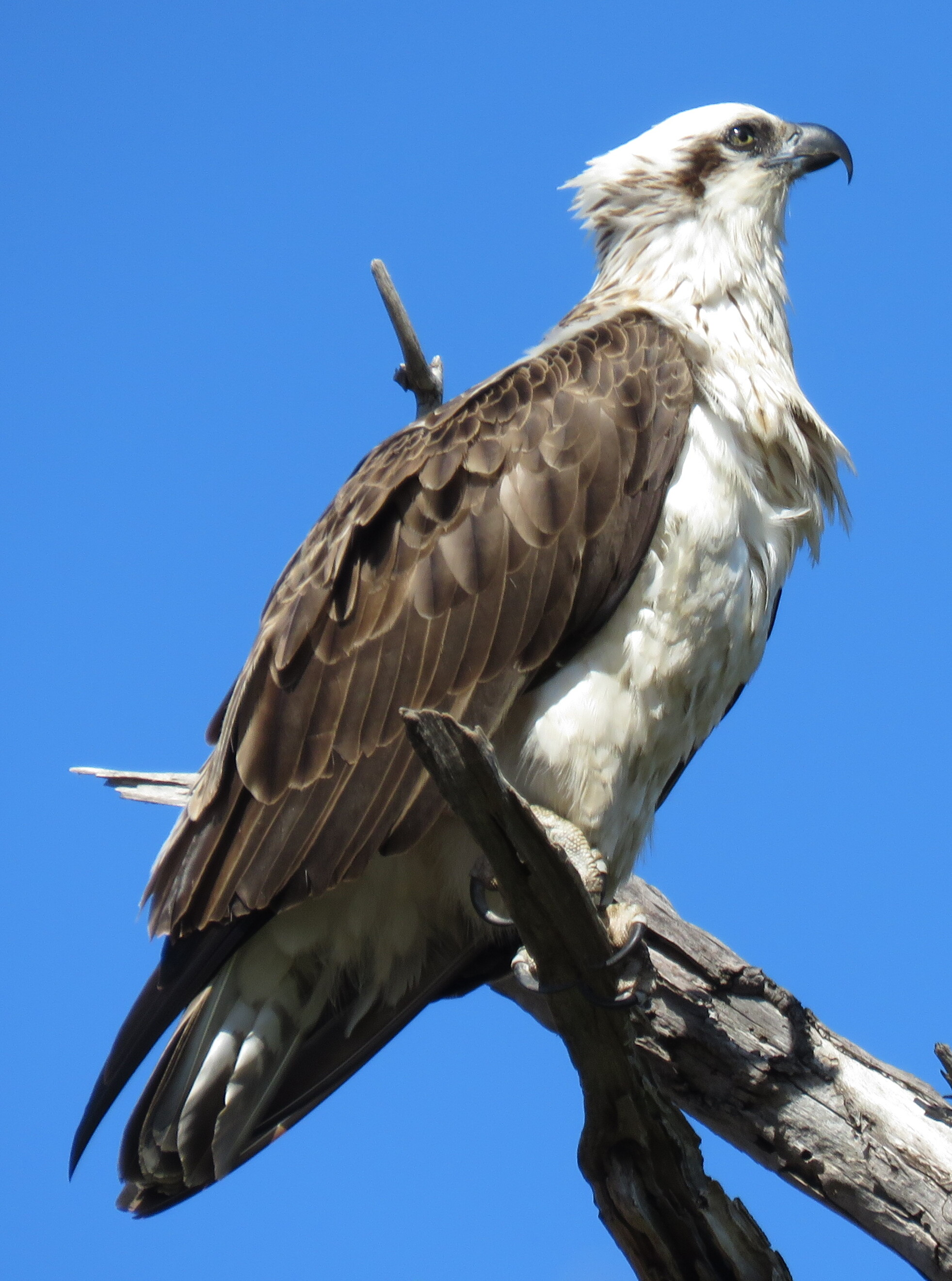
Australasian osprey
(P. h. cristatus),
in Australia

A 2018 genetic study using microsatellite data showed only low genetic divergence between cristatus and the other subspecies.

- P. h. haliaetus (Linnaeus, 1758) – the Eurasian osprey is the nominate subspecies that occurs across the Palearctic realm and several parts of sub-Saharan Africa from the Azores and the Iberian Peninsula east to Japan and Kamchatka Peninsula, throughout South and Southeast Asia, the Indian subcontinent, Madagascar, and much of the African coastline.
- P. h. ridgwayi Maynard, 1887 – Ridgway's osprey occurs in the Caribbean islands. It has a very pale head and breast and a weak eye mask. It is nonmigratory. Its scientific name commemorates Robert Ridgway.

=== Fossil record ===
Three extinct species have been named from the fossil record.

Pandion homalopteron described by Stuart L. Warter in 1976 was found in marine Middle Miocene deposits of the Barstovian age in the southern part of California. Pandion lovensis was described in 1985 and found in Florida; it dates to the Late Clarendonian and possibly represents a separate lineage from that of P. homalopteron and P. haliaetus. A number of claw fossils have been recovered from Pliocene and Pleistocene sediments in Florida.

The oldest recognised family Pandionidae fossils were recovered from the Oligocene epoch Jebel Qatrani Formation in Faiyum Governorate, Egypt, but they are not complete enough to assign to a specific genus. The remains of another Oligocene species were discovered in Hungary and described as P. pannonicus. Another Pandionidae claw fossil was recovered from Early Oligocene deposits in the Mainz basin, Germany, and was described in 2006 by Gerald Mayr.

== Etymology ==
The genus name Pandion derives from Pandíōn Πανδίων, the mythical Greek king of Athens and grandfather of Theseus, Pandion II. The species name haliaetus (Latin: haliaeetus) comes from Greek ἁλιάετος haliáetos "sea-eagle" (also ἁλιαίετος haliaietos) from the combining form ἁλι- hali- of ἅλς hals "sea" and ἀετός aetos, "eagle".

The origins of "osprey" are obscure; the word itself was first recorded around 1460, derived via the Anglo-French ospriet and the Medieval Latin avis prede "bird of prey," from the Latin avis praedae though the Oxford English Dictionary notes a connection with the Latin ossifraga or "bone breaker" of Pliny the Elder. However, this term referred to the bearded vulture.

== Description ==
Osprey at Cootes Paradise, Hamilton, Ontario

The osprey differs in several respects from other diurnal birds of prey. Its toes are of equal length, its tarsi are reticulated, and its talons are rounded, rather than grooved. The osprey and owls are the only raptors whose outer toes are reversible, allowing them to grasp their prey with two toes in front and two behind. This is particularly helpful when they grab slippery fish. The osprey is 0.9–2.1 kg (2.0–4.6 lb) in weight and 50–66 cm (20–26 in) in length with a 127–180 cm (50–71 in) wingspan. It is, thus, of similar size to the largest members of the Buteo or Falco genera. The subspecies are fairly close in size, with the nominate subspecies averaging 1.53 kg (3.4 lb), P. h. carolinensis averaging 1.7 kg (3.7 lb), and P. h. cristatus averaging 1.25 kg (2.8 lb). The wing chord measures 38 to 52 cm (15 to 20 in), the tail measures 16.5 to 24 cm (6.5 to 9.4 in), and the tarsus is 5.2–6.6 cm (2.0–2.6 in).

The upperparts are a deep, glossy brown, while the breast is white, sometimes streaked with brown, and the underparts are pure white. The head is white with a dark mask across the eyes, reaching to the sides of the neck. The irises of the eyes are golden to brown, and the transparent nictitating membrane is pale blue. The bill is black, with a blue cere, and the feet are white with black talons. On the underside of the wings, the wrists are black, which serves as a field mark. A short tail and long, narrow wings with four long, finger-like feathers, and a shorter fifth, give it a very distinctive appearance.

The sexes appear fairly similar, but the adult male can be distinguished from the female by his slimmer body and narrower wings. The breast band of the male is also weaker than that of the female or is nonexistent, and the underwing coverts of the male are more uniformly pale. Determining the sex in a breeding pair is straightforward, but harder with individual birds.

The juvenile osprey may be identified by buff fringes to the plumage of the upperparts, a buff tone to the underparts, and streaked feathers on the head. During spring, barring on the underwings and flight feathers is a better indicator of a young bird, due to wear on the upperparts.

In flight, the osprey has arched wings and drooping "hands", giving it a gull-like appearance. The call is a series of sharp whistles, described as cheep, cheep, or yewk, yewk. If disturbed by activity near the nest, the call is a frenzied cheereek!

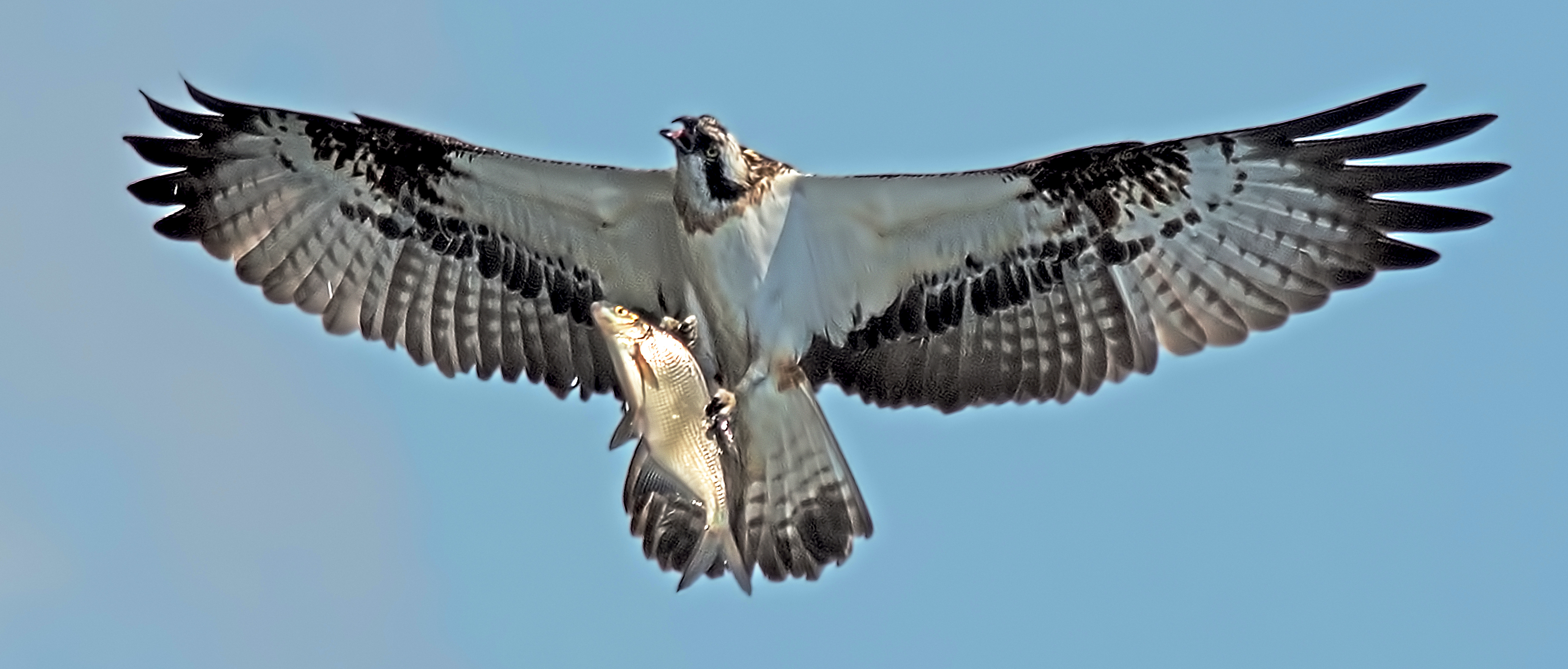
Eurasian osprey (P. h. haliaetus)

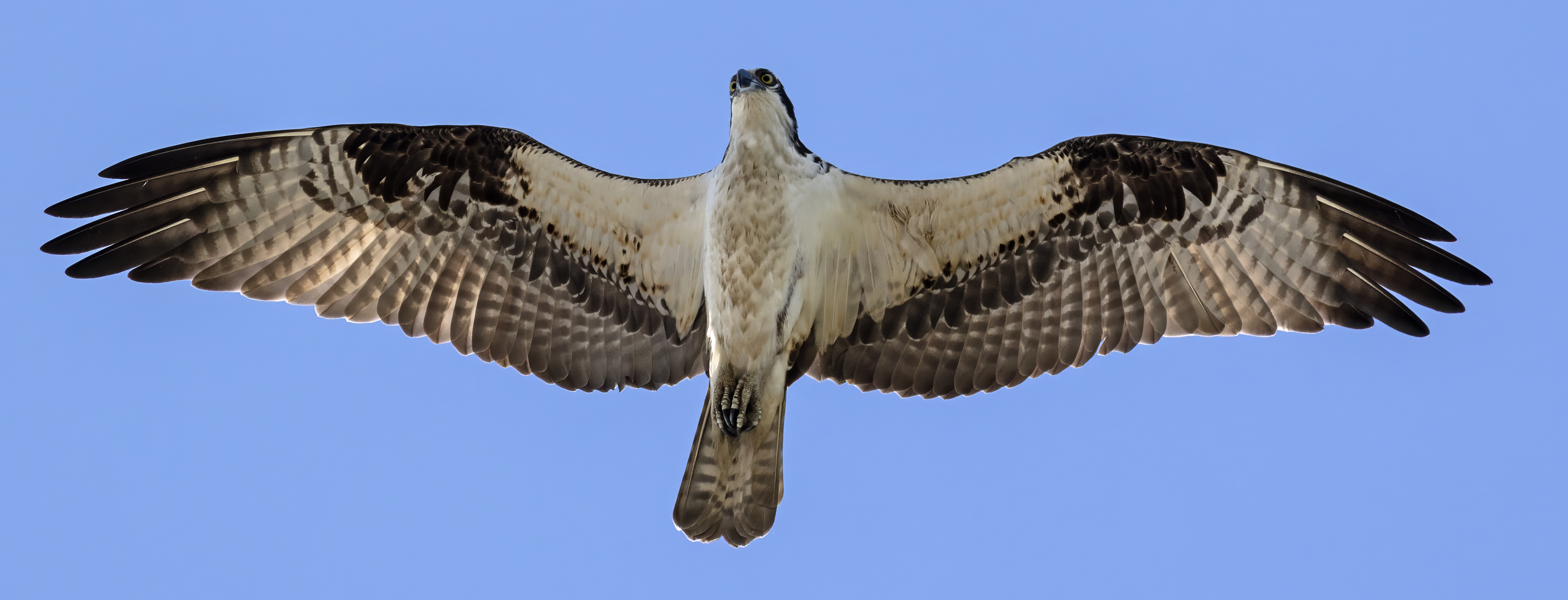
American osprey (P. h. carolinensis)

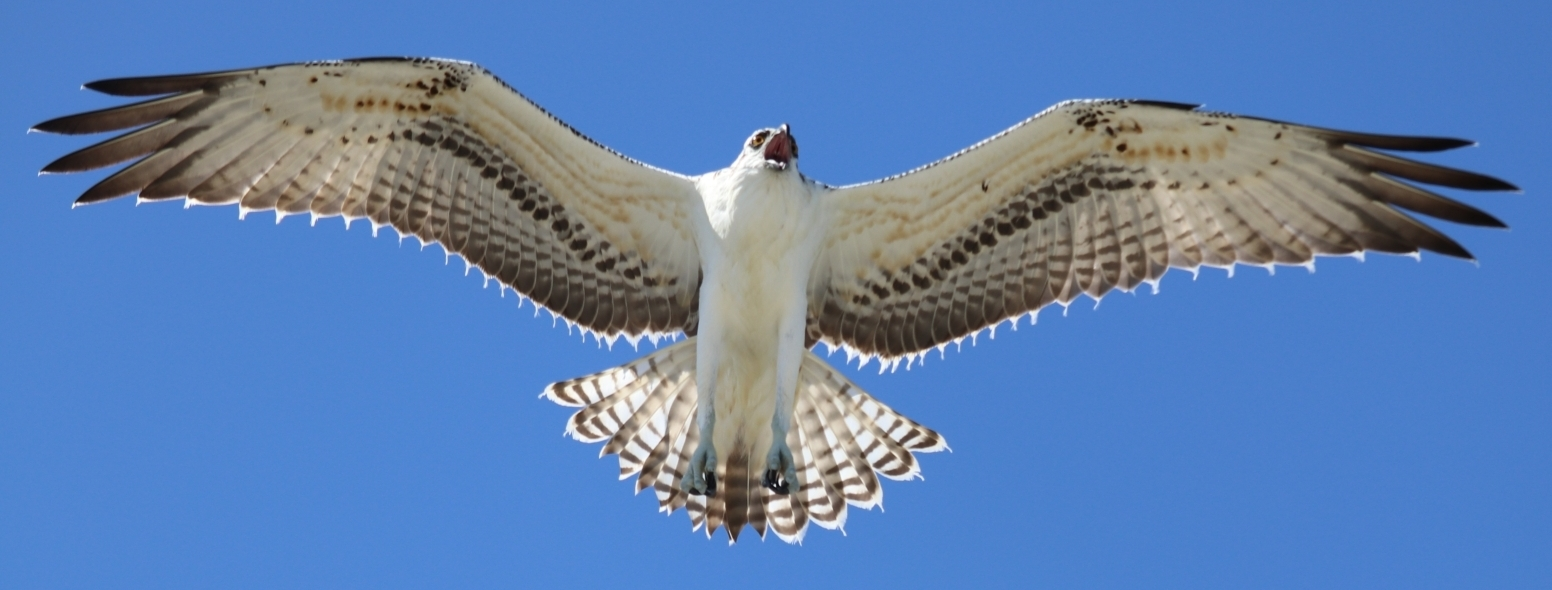
Caribbean osprey (P. h. ridgwayi)

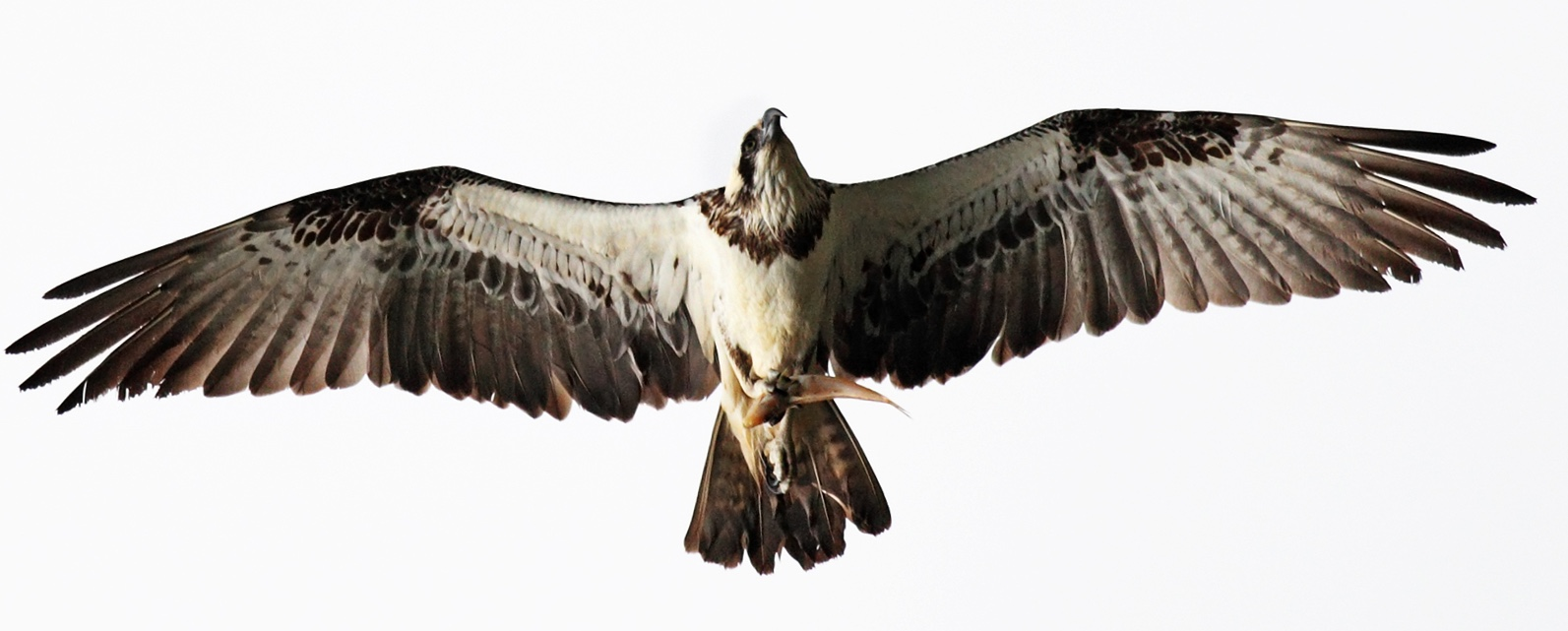
Australasian osprey (P. h. cristatus)

== Distribution and habitat ==
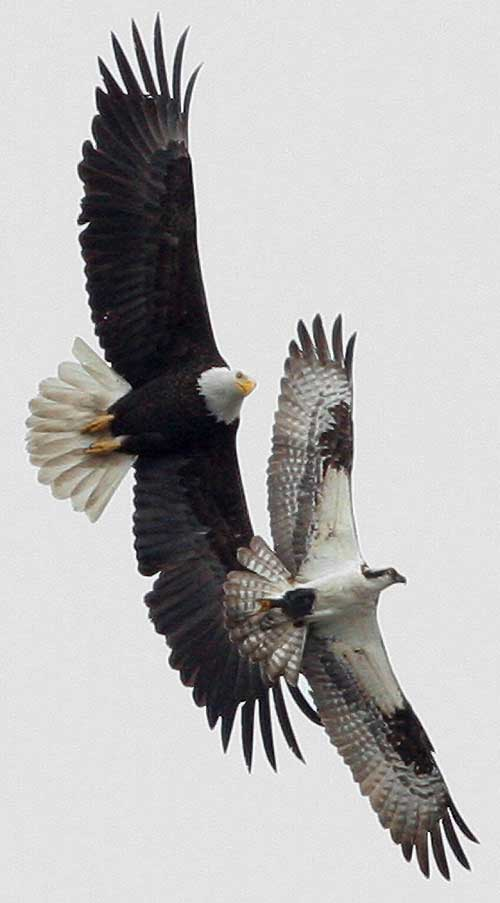
American osprey pursued by a bald eagle attempting to steal a fish it caught; in Colorado

The osprey is the second-most widely distributed raptor species, after the peregrine falcon, and is one of only six land birds with a worldwide distribution. It is found in temperate and tropical regions of all continents, except Antarctica. In North America it breeds from Alaska and Newfoundland south to the Gulf Coast and Florida, wintering further south from the southern United States through to Argentina. It is found in summer throughout Europe north into Ireland, Scandinavia, Finland, and Great Britain, though not Iceland, and winters in North Africa. In Australia, it is mainly sedentary and found patchily around the coastline, though it is a nonbreeding visitor to eastern Victoria and Tasmania.

A 1,000 km (620 mi) gap, corresponding with the coast of the Nullarbor Plain, occurs between its westernmost breeding site in South Australia and the nearest breeding sites to the west in Western Australia. In the islands of the Pacific, it is found in the Bismarck Islands, Solomon Islands, and New Caledonia, and fossil remains of adults and juveniles have been found in Tonga, where it probably was wiped out by arriving humans. It may once have ranged across Vanuatu and Fiji, as well. It is an uncommon to fairly common winter visitor to all parts of South Asia, and Southeast Asia from Myanmar to Indochina and southern China, Indonesia, Malaysia, and the Philippines.

== Behaviour and ecology ==
=== Diet ===
The osprey is piscivorous, with fish making up 99% of its diet. It typically takes live fish weighing 150–300 g (5.3–10.6 oz) and about 25–35 cm (9.8–13.8 in) in length, but virtually any type of fish from 50 g (1.8 oz) to 2 kg (4.4 lb) can be taken. Even larger 2.8 kg (6.2 lb) northern pike (Esox lucius) have been taken in Russia. The species rarely scavenges dead or dying fish.

Ospreys' vision is well adapted to detecting underwater objects from the air. Prey is first sighted when the bird is 10–40 m (33–131 ft) above the water, after which it hovers momentarily and then plunges feet first into the water. It catches fish by diving into a body of water, oftentimes completely submerging its entire body. As an osprey dives, it adjusts the angle of its flight to account for the distortion of the fish's image caused by refraction. Ospreys will typically eat on a nearby perch but have also been known to carry fish for longer distances.

Occasionally, the osprey may prey on rodents, rabbits, hares, other mammals, snakes, turtles, small alligators, frogs, birds, salamanders, conchs, and crustaceans. Reports of ospreys feeding on carrion are rare, but they have been observed eating dead white-tailed deer and Virginia opossums.

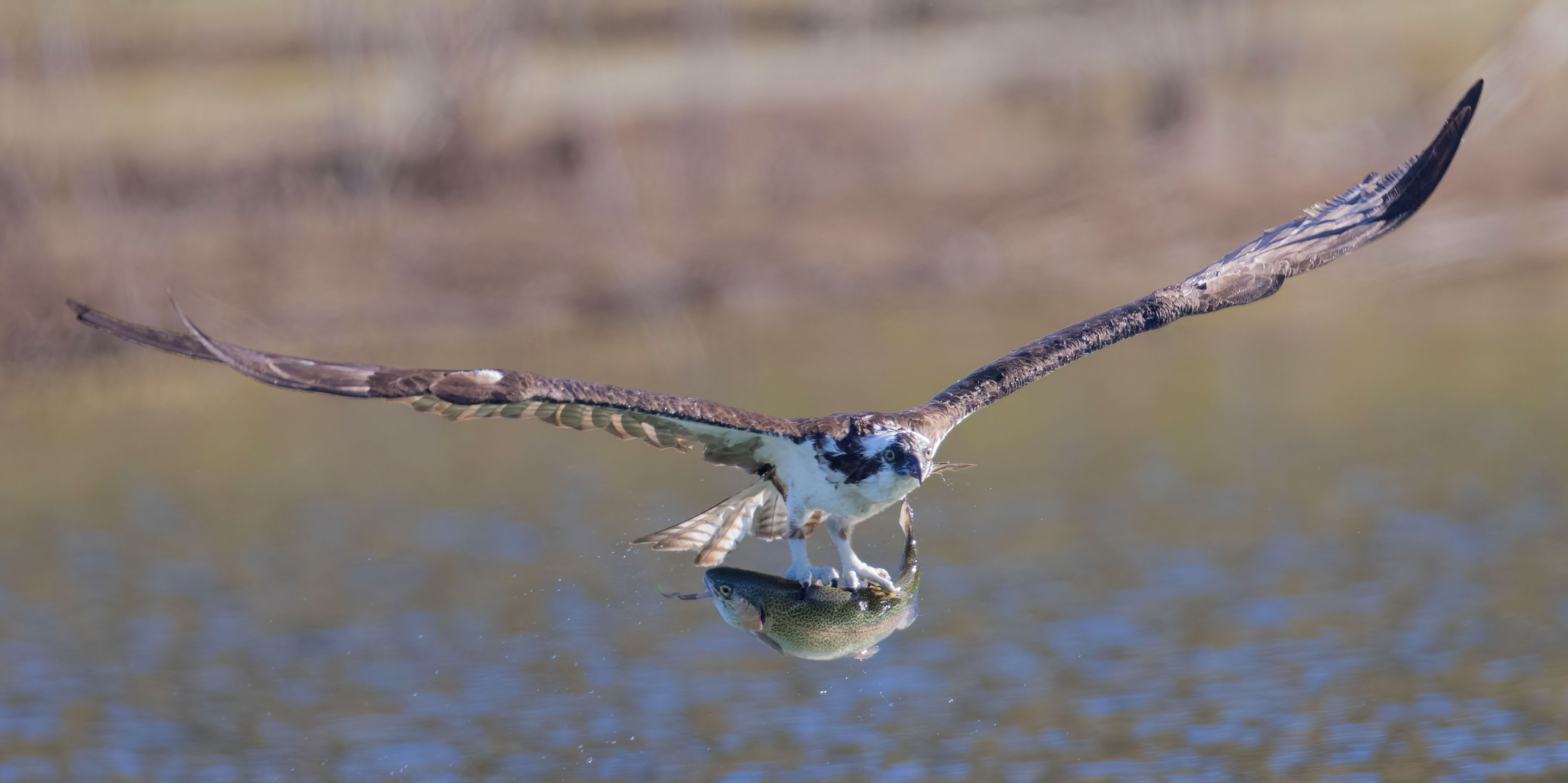
American osprey with rainbow trout

American osprey with American gizzard shad

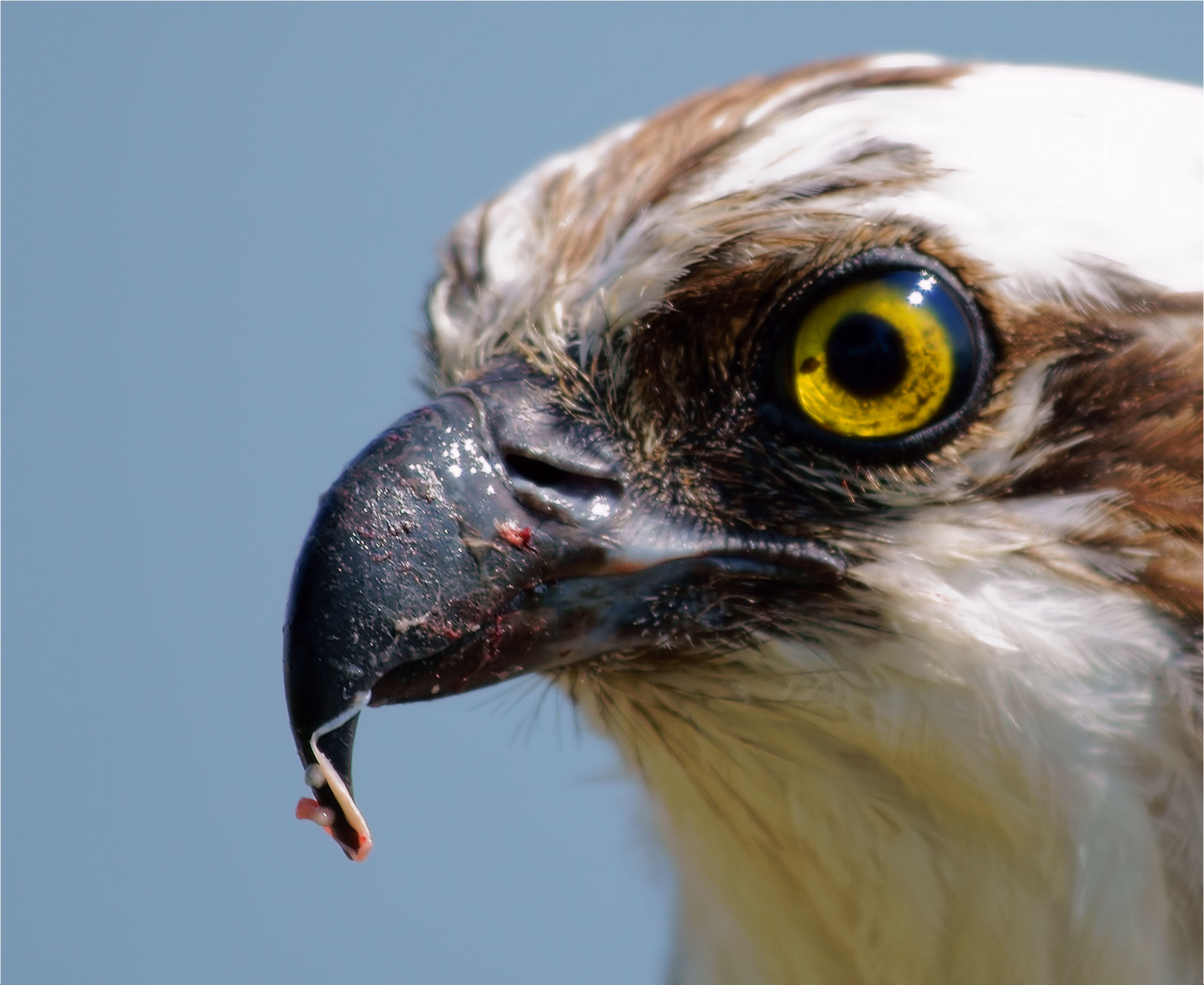
American osprey with scraps of fish on its beak

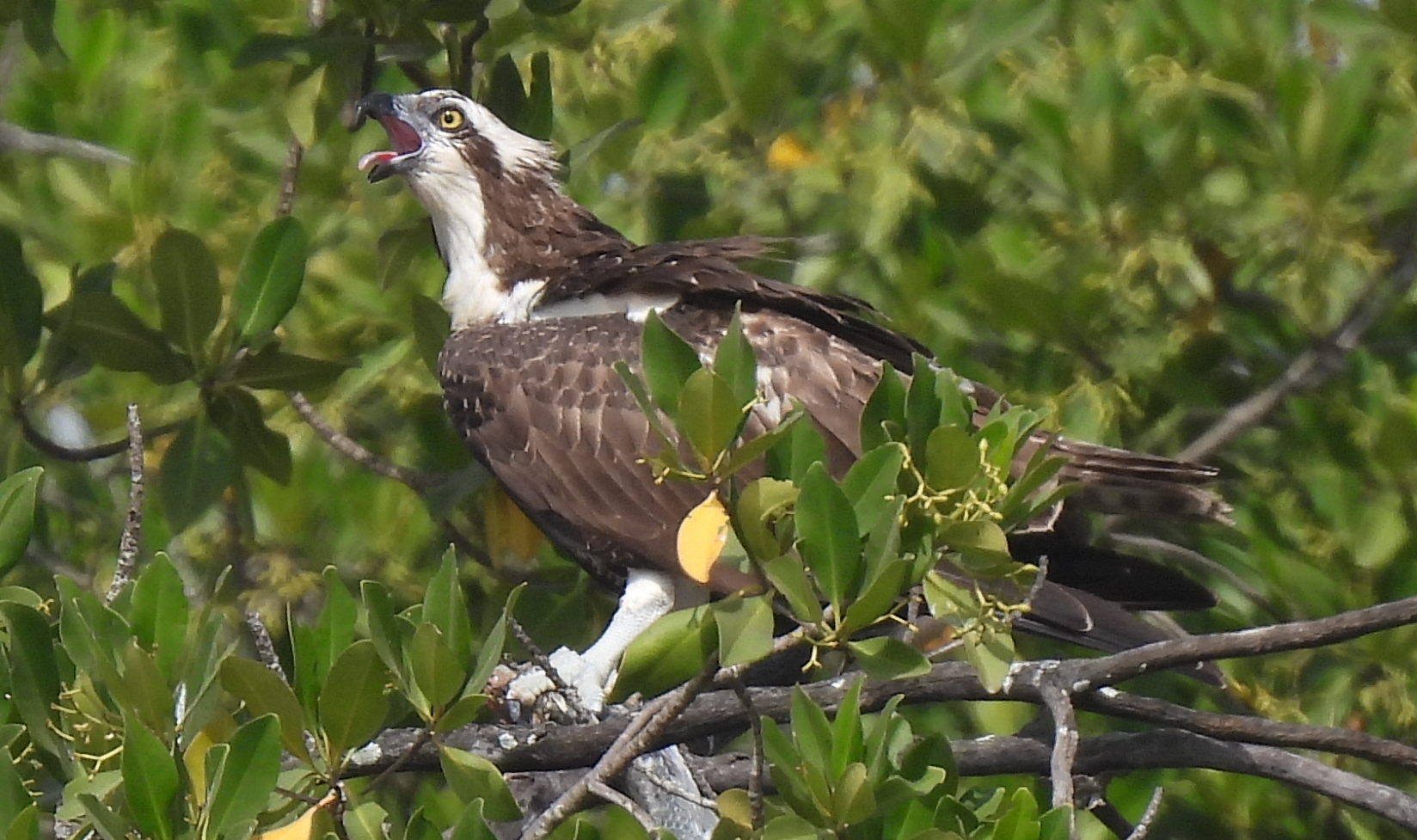
Eurasian osprey feeding on a fish in Kartung, the Gambia: Characteristically, its tongue often pokes out whilst swallowing food.

=== Adaptations ===
The osprey has several adaptations that suit its piscivorous lifestyle. These include reversible outer toes, sharp spicules on the underside of the toes, closable nostrils to keep out water during dives, backward-facing scales on the talons that act as barbs to help hold its catch, and dense, oily plumage to prevent its feathers from getting waterlogged.

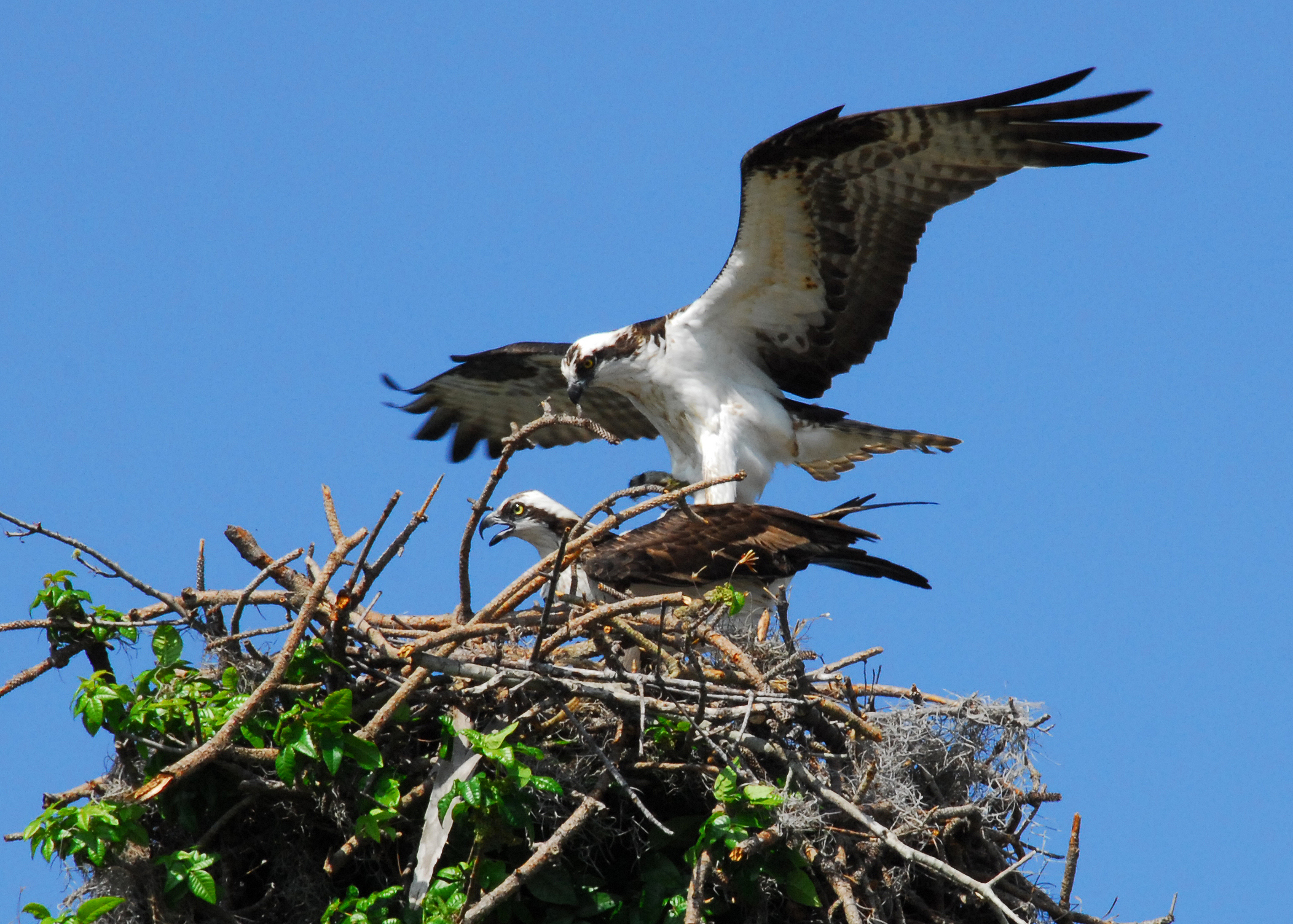
American ospreys preparing to mate on the nest

=== Reproduction ===
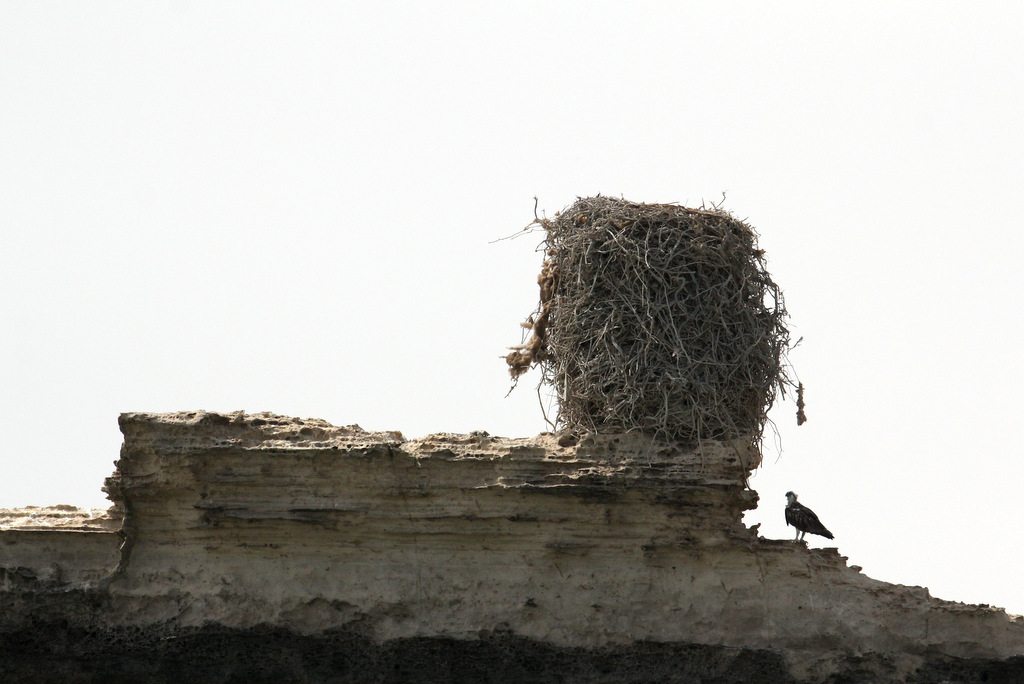
Eurasian osprey standing next to its nest showing their relative sizes

The osprey breeds near freshwater lakes and rivers, and sometimes on coastal brackish waters. Rocky outcrops just offshore are used in Rottnest Island off the coast of Western Australia, where 14 or so similar nesting sites are known, of which five to seven are used in any one year. Many are renovated each season, and some have been used for 70 years. The nest is a large heap of sticks, driftwood, turf, or seaweed built in forks of trees, rocky outcrops, utility poles, artificial platforms, or offshore islets. As wide as 2 m and weighing about 135 kg (298 lb), large nests on utility poles may be fire hazards and have caused power outages.

Generally, ospreys reach sexual maturity and begin breeding around the age of three to four, though in some regions with high osprey densities, such as Chesapeake Bay in the United States, they may not start breeding until five to seven years old, and a shortage of suitable tall structures may exist. If no nesting sites are available, young ospreys may be forced to delay breeding. To ease this problem, posts are sometimes erected to provide more sites suitable for nest building. The nesting platform design developed by Citizens United to Protect the Maurice River and its Tributaries, Inc. has become the official design of the State of New Jersey in the US. The nesting platform plans and materials list, available online, have been used by people from a number of different geographical regions. A global site maps osprey nest locations and logs observations on reproductive success.

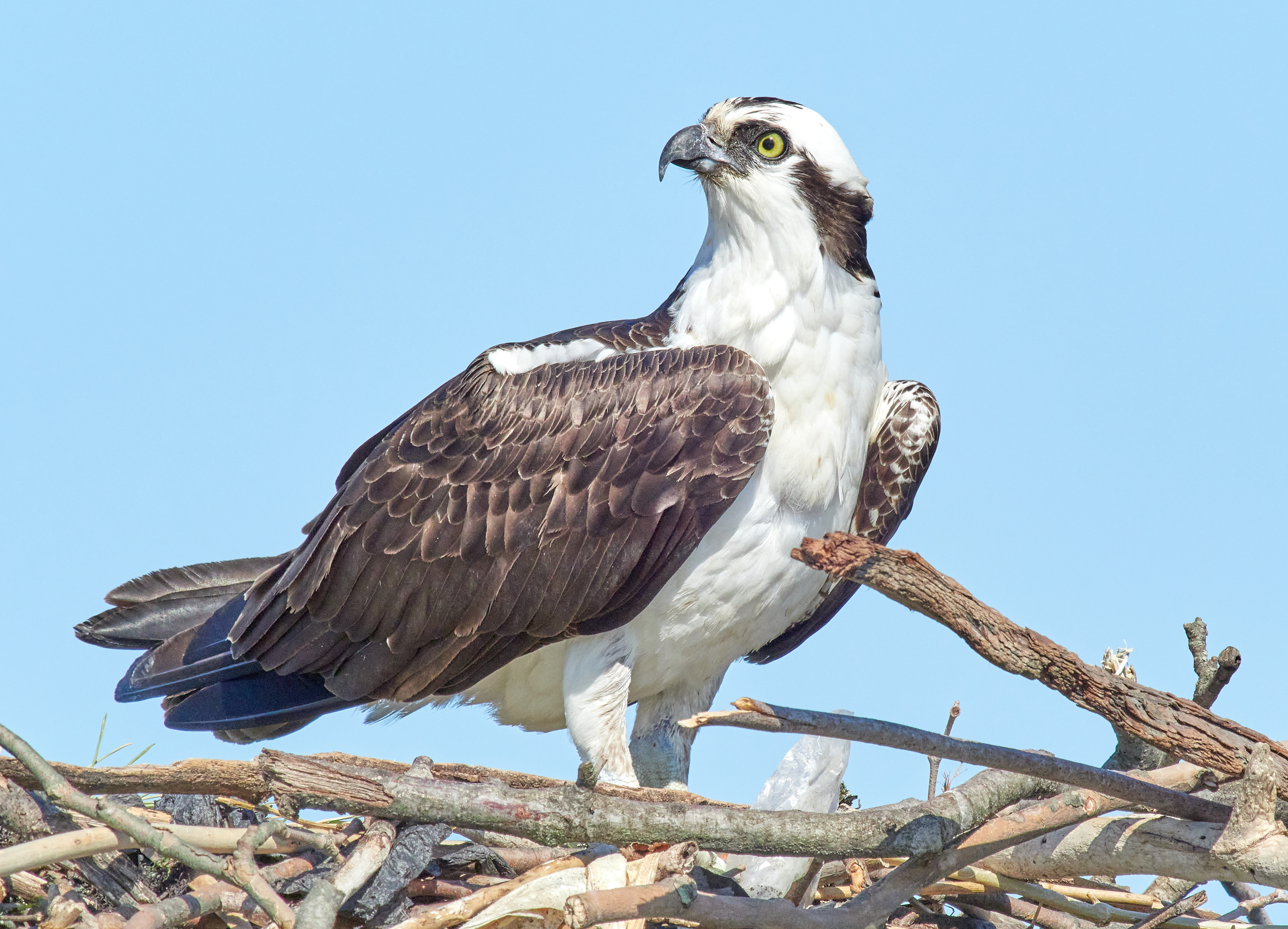
American osprey standing on its nest

Ospreys usually mate for life. Rarely, polyandry has been recorded. The breeding season varies according to latitude: spring (September–October) in southern Australia, April to July in northern Australia, and winter (June–August) in southern Queensland. In spring, the pair begins a five-month period of partnership to raise their young. The female lays two to four eggs within a month and relies on the size of the nest to conserve heat. The eggs are whitish with bold splotches of reddish-brown and are about 6.2 cm × 4.5 cm (2.4 in × 1.8 in) and weigh about 65 g (2.3 oz). The eggs are incubated for about 35–43 days to hatching.

The newly hatched chicks weigh only 50–60 g (1.8–2.1 oz), but fledge in 8–10 weeks. A study on Kangaroo Island, South Australia, had an average time between hatching and fledging of 69 days. The same study found an average of 0.66 young fledged per year per occupied territory, and 0.92 young fledged per year per active nest. Some 22% of surviving young either remained on the island or returned at maturity to join the breeding population. When food is scarce, the first chicks to hatch are most likely to survive. The typical lifespan is 7–10 years, though individuals rarely can live 20–25 years. The oldest European wild osprey on record lived to be 26 years and 11 months of age.

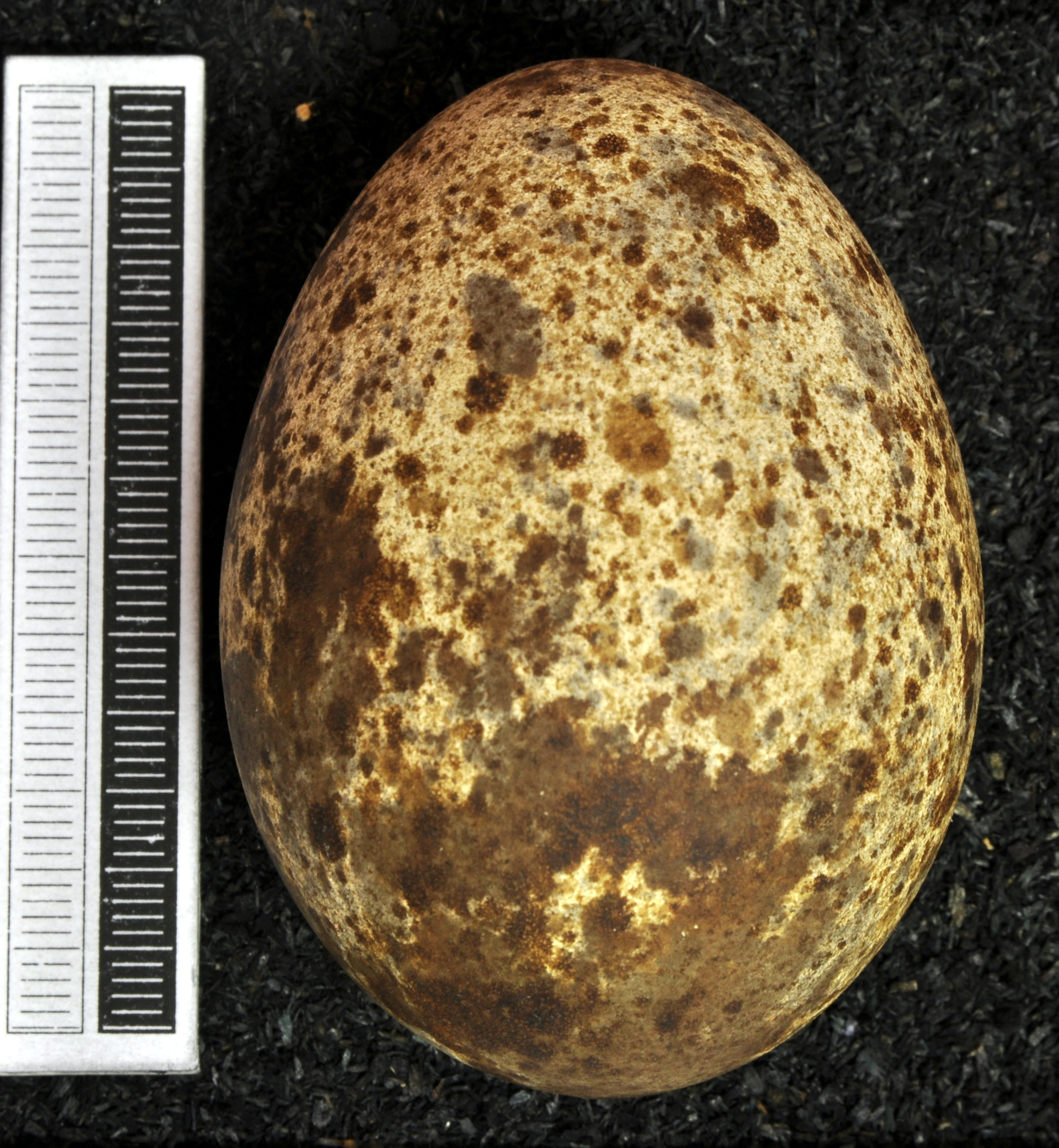
Egg, collection of the Museum Wiesbaden

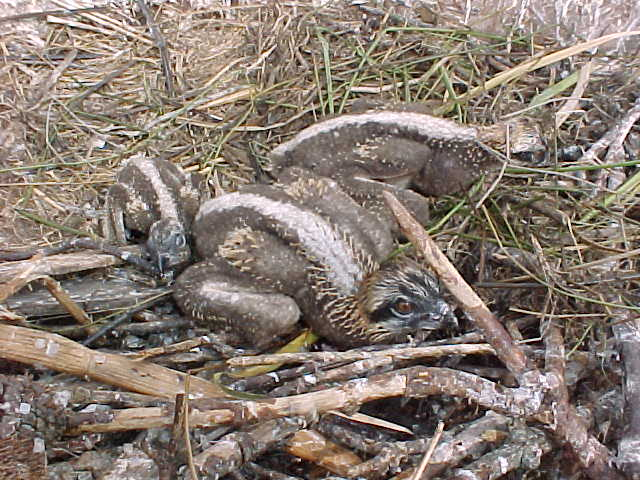
Hatchling chicks

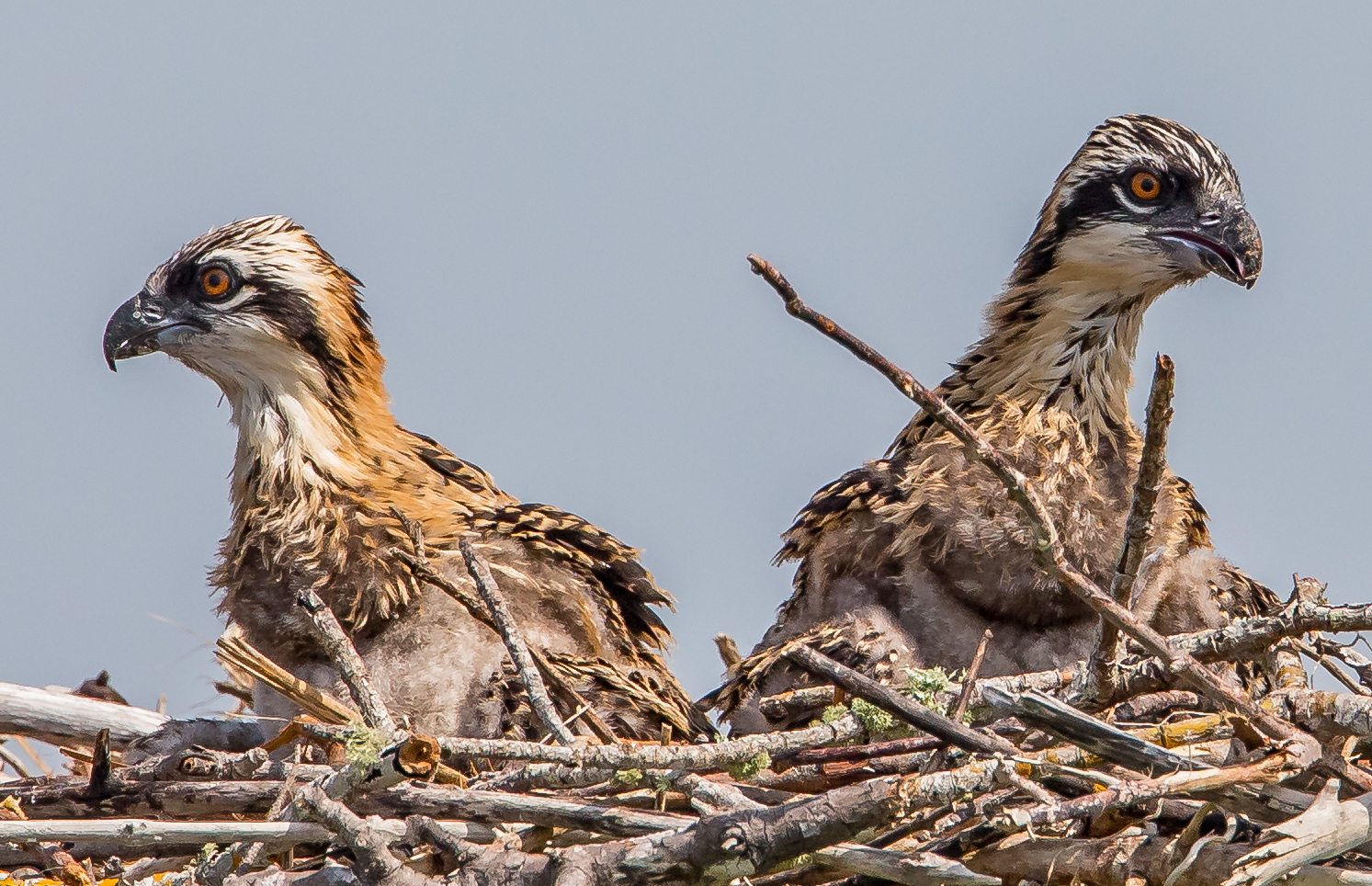
5 week old chicks

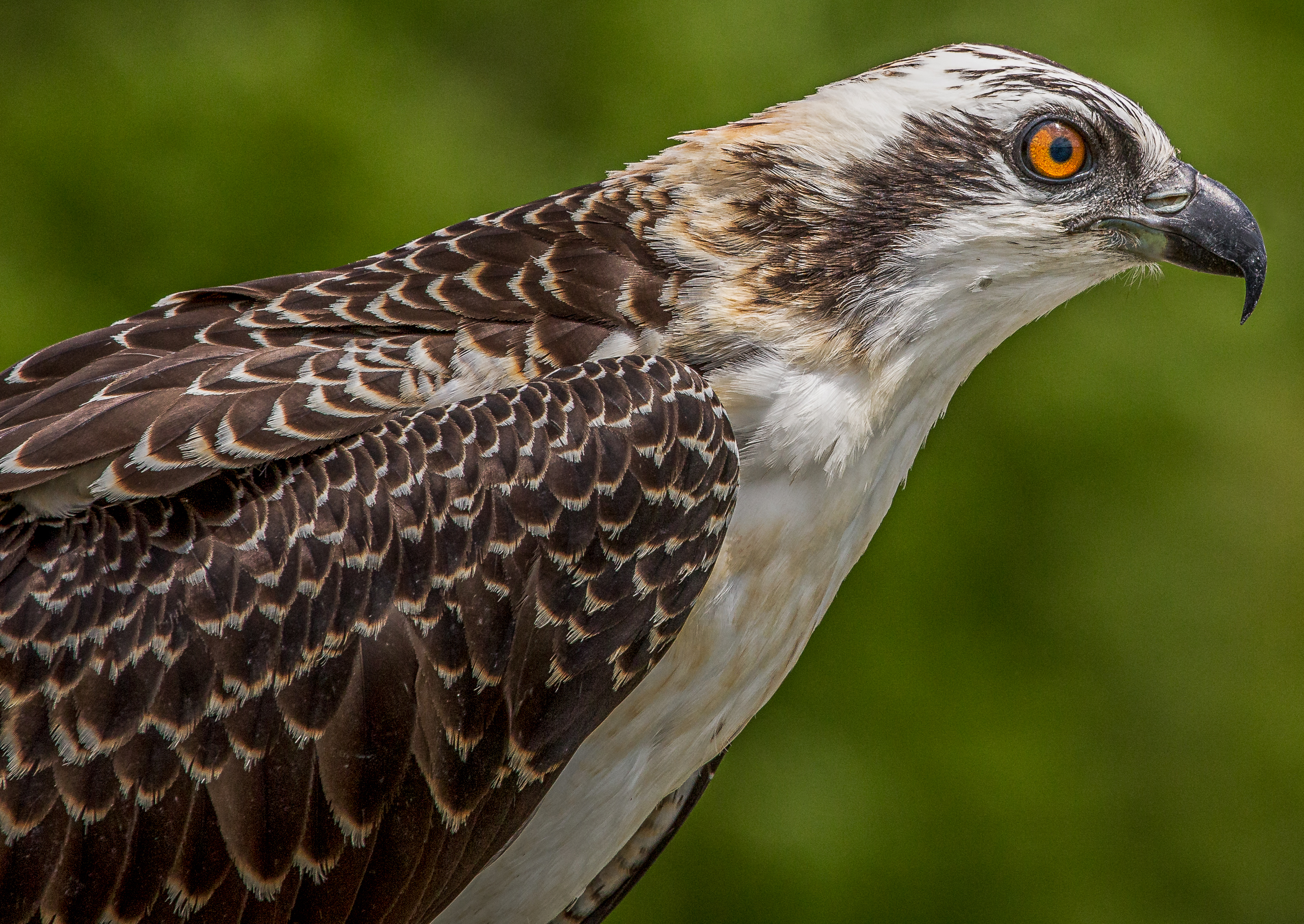
Fledgling juvenile

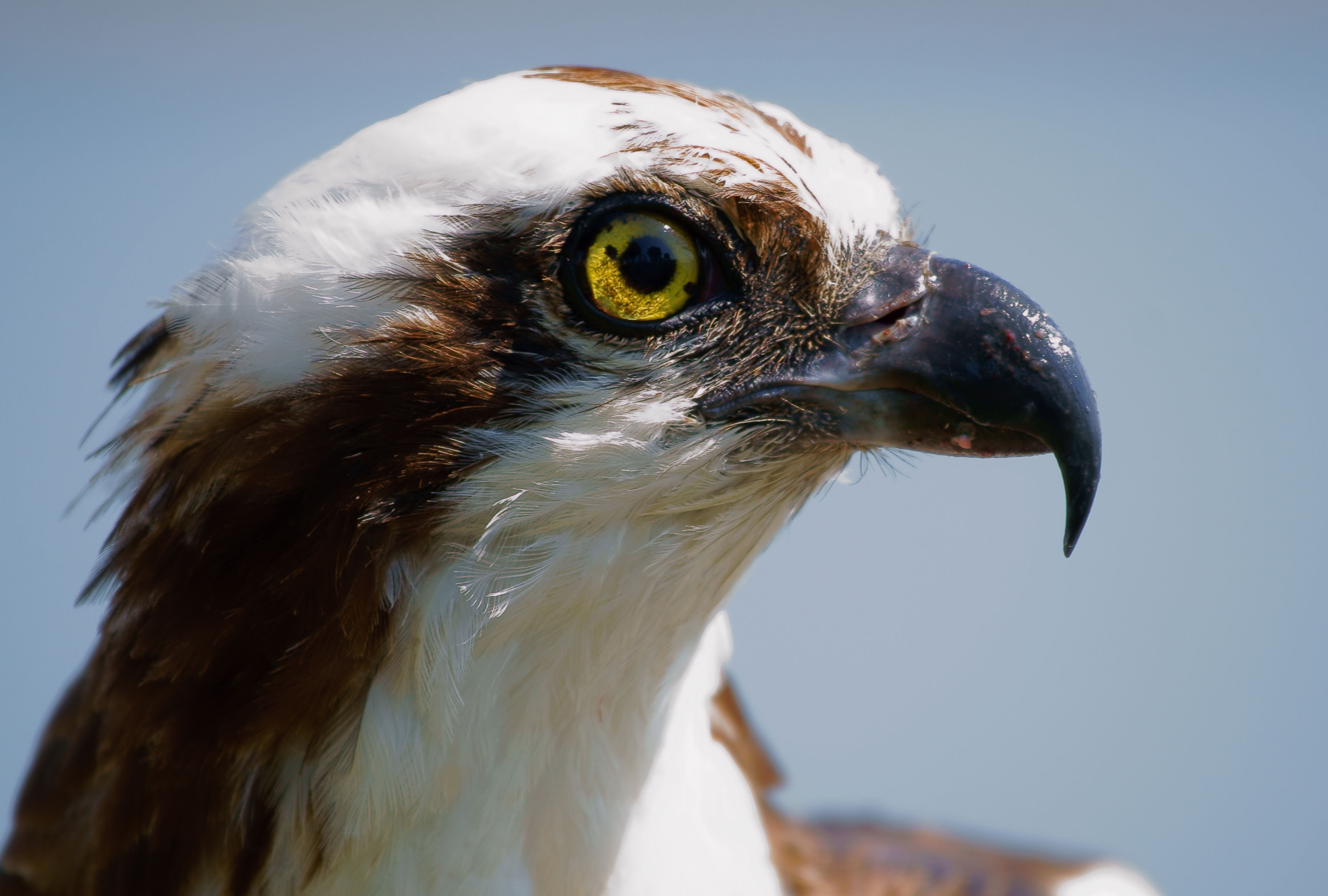
Adult

=== Migration ===
European breeders winter in Africa. American and Canadian breeders winter in South America, although some stay in the southernmost US states such as Florida and California. Some ospreys from Florida migrate to South America. Australasian ospreys tend not to migrate.

Studies of Swedish ospreys showed that females tend to migrate to Africa earlier than males. More stopovers are made during their autumn migration. The variation of timing and duration in autumn was more variable than in spring. Although migrating predominantly during the day, they sometimes fly in the dark hours, particularly in crossings over water and cover on average 260–280 km (160–170 mi) per day with a maximum of 431 km (268 mi) per day. European birds may also winter in South Asia, as indicated by an osprey tagged in Norway being monitored in western India. In the Mediterranean, ospreys show partial migratory behaviour with some individuals remaining resident, whilst others undertake relatively short migration trips.

=== Mortality ===
Swedish ospreys have a significantly higher mortality rate during migration seasons than during stationary periods, with more than half of the total annual mortality occurring during migration. These deaths can also be categorised into spatial patterns: Spring mortality occurs mainly in Africa, which can be traced to crossing the Sahara. Mortality can also occur through mishaps with human utilities, such as nesting near overhead electric cables or collisions with aircraft.

== Predation ==
In Florida, ospreys may be eaten by some growth stage of invasive snakes such as Burmese pythons, reticulated pythons, Southern African rock pythons, Central African rock pythons, boa constrictors, yellow anacondas, Bolivian anacondas, dark-spotted anacondas, and green anacondas.

== Conservation ==
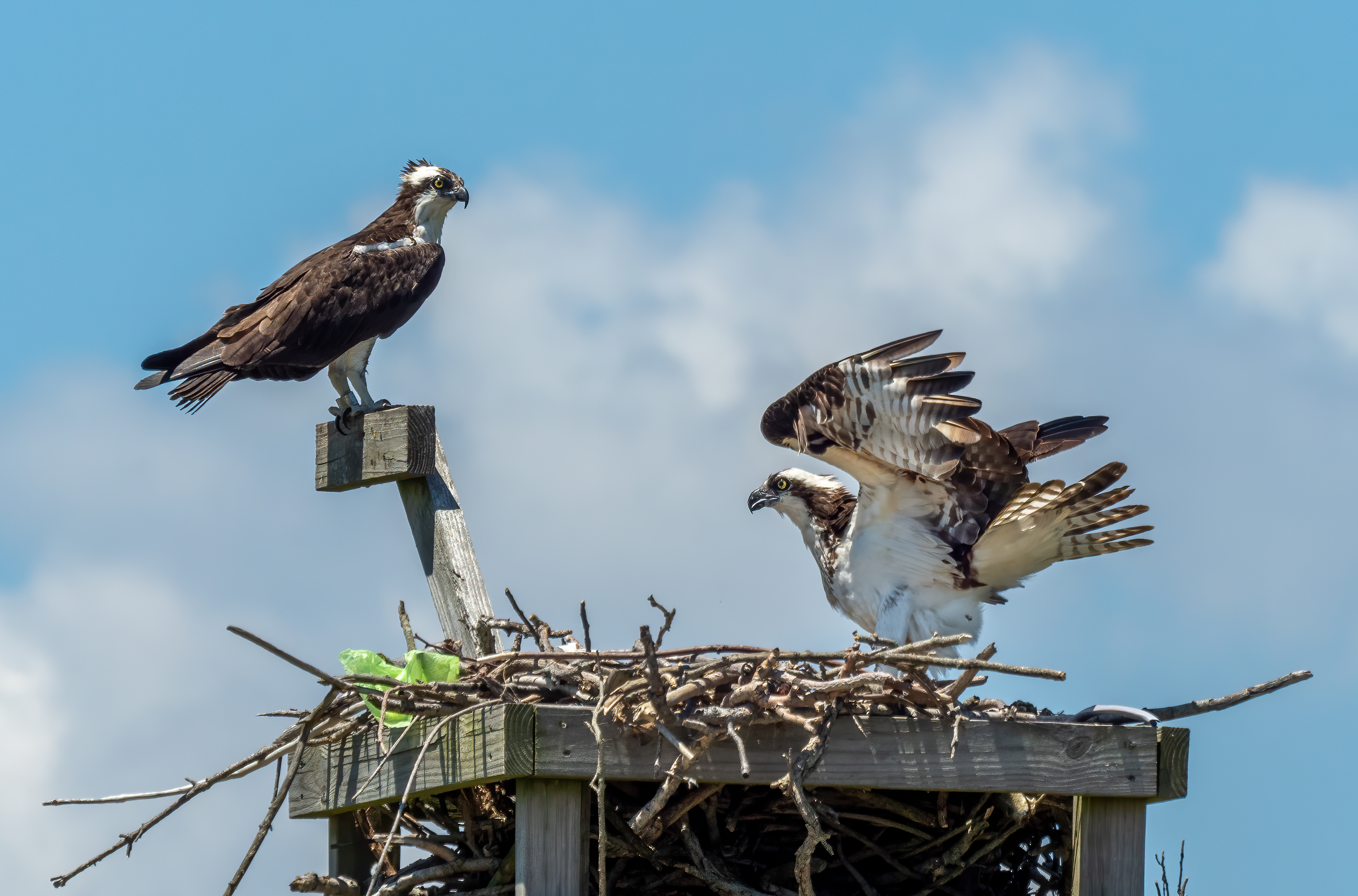
Adult American ospreys on a man-made nest in New Jersey, US

The osprey has a large range, covering 9,670,000 km^{2} (3,730,000 sq mi) in just Africa and the Americas, and has a large global population estimated at 460,000 individuals. Although global population trends have not been quantified, the species is not believed to approach the thresholds for the population decline criterion of the IUCN Red List (i.e., declining more than 30% in ten years or three generations), and for these reasons, the species is evaluated as least concern. Evidence indicates regional decline in South Australia, where former territories at locations in the Spencer Gulf and along the lower Murray River have been vacant for decades.

In the late 19th and early 20th centuries, the main threats to osprey populations were egg collectors and hunting of the adults, along with other birds of prey, but osprey populations declined drastically in many areas in the 1950s and 1960s; this appeared to be in part due to the toxic effects of insecticides such as DDT on reproduction. The pesticide interfered with the bird's calcium metabolism, which resulted in thin-shelled, easily broken or infertile eggs. Possibly because of the banning of DDT in many countries in the early 1970s, together with reduced persecution, the osprey, as well as other affected bird of prey species, have made significant recoveries. Artificial nesting sites have also played a role in conservation. Farmers discovered that building artificial nesting sites was mutually beneficial; this reduced the impact of habitat loss, and the ospreys would drive away red-tailed hawks that preyed on farmers' chickens.

States such as Illinois have them listed as endangered due to low nesting rates, but their population has continued to grow across their historical range. Florida has ospreys unlisted on its threatened species list as of 2018, but they remain on its Imperiled Species Management Plan.

In South Australia, nesting sites on the Eyre Peninsula and Kangaroo Island are vulnerable to unmanaged coastal recreation and encroaching urban development.

== Cultural depictions ==
=== Literature ===
- Roman writer Pliny the Elder reported that parent ospreys made their young fly up to the sun as a test and dispatched any that failed.
- Another odd legend regarding this fish-eating bird of prey, derived from the writings of Gerald of Wales and later Albertus Magnus and recorded in Holinshed's Chronicles, was that it had one webbed foot and one taloned foot.
- The osprey is mentioned in the famous Chinese folk poem "guan guan ju jiu" (關關雎鳩); ju jiu 雎鳩 refers to the osprey, and guan guan (關關) to its voice. In the poem, the osprey is considered to be an icon of fidelity and harmony between wife and husband, due to its highly monogamous habits. Some commentators have claimed that ju jiu in the poem is not the osprey, but the mallard duck, since the osprey cannot make the sound "guan guan".
- Irish poet William Butler Yeats used a grey wandering osprey as a representation of sorrow in The Wanderings of Oisin and Other Poems (1889).
- A medieval belief held that fish were so mesmerised by the osprey that they turned belly-up in surrender, and this is referenced by Shakespeare in Act 4 Scene 5 of Coriolanus:

I think he'll be to Rome
As is the osprey to the fish, who takes it
By sovereignty of nature.

=== Iconography ===
- In heraldry, the osprey is typically depicted as a white eagle, often maintaining a fish in its talons or beak, and termed a "sea-eagle". It is historically regarded as a symbol of vision and abundance; more recently, it has become a symbol of positive responses to nature, and has been featured on more than 50 international postage stamps.
- In 1994, the osprey was declared the provincial bird of Nova Scotia, Canada.
The osprey pictured in the coat of arms of Sääksmäki

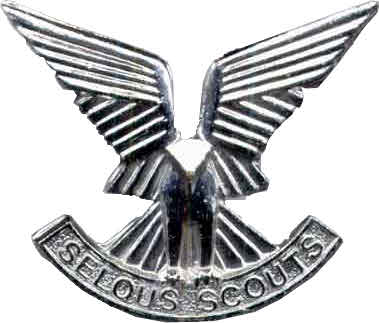
Cap badge of the Selous Scouts was a stylized osprey

=== Sports ===
Some sports clubs are named after the osprey, such as the University of North Florida's North Florida Ospreys, the Missoula Osprey baseball team, and the Ospreys, the Swansea-based rugby union team.

"Seahawks", another term for osprey, is also common among sports teams. The Seattle Seahawks, a professional American football team in the National Football League, received their identity from a naming contest, defeating 1,740 others. According to team general manager John Thompson, the name "shows aggressiveness, reflects our soaring Northwest heritage, and belongs to no other major league team."

=== Other ===
So-called "osprey" plumes were an important item in the plume trade of the late 19th century and used in hats including those used as part of the army uniform. Despite their name, these plumes were actually obtained from egrets.

During the 2017 regular session of the Oregon Legislature, a short-lived controversy arose over the western meadowlark's status as the state bird versus the osprey. The sometimes-spirited debate included State Representative Rich Vial playing the meadowlark's song on his smart phone over the House microphone. A compromise was reached in SCR 18, which was passed on the last day of the session, designating the western meadowlark as the state songbird and the osprey as the state raptor.
