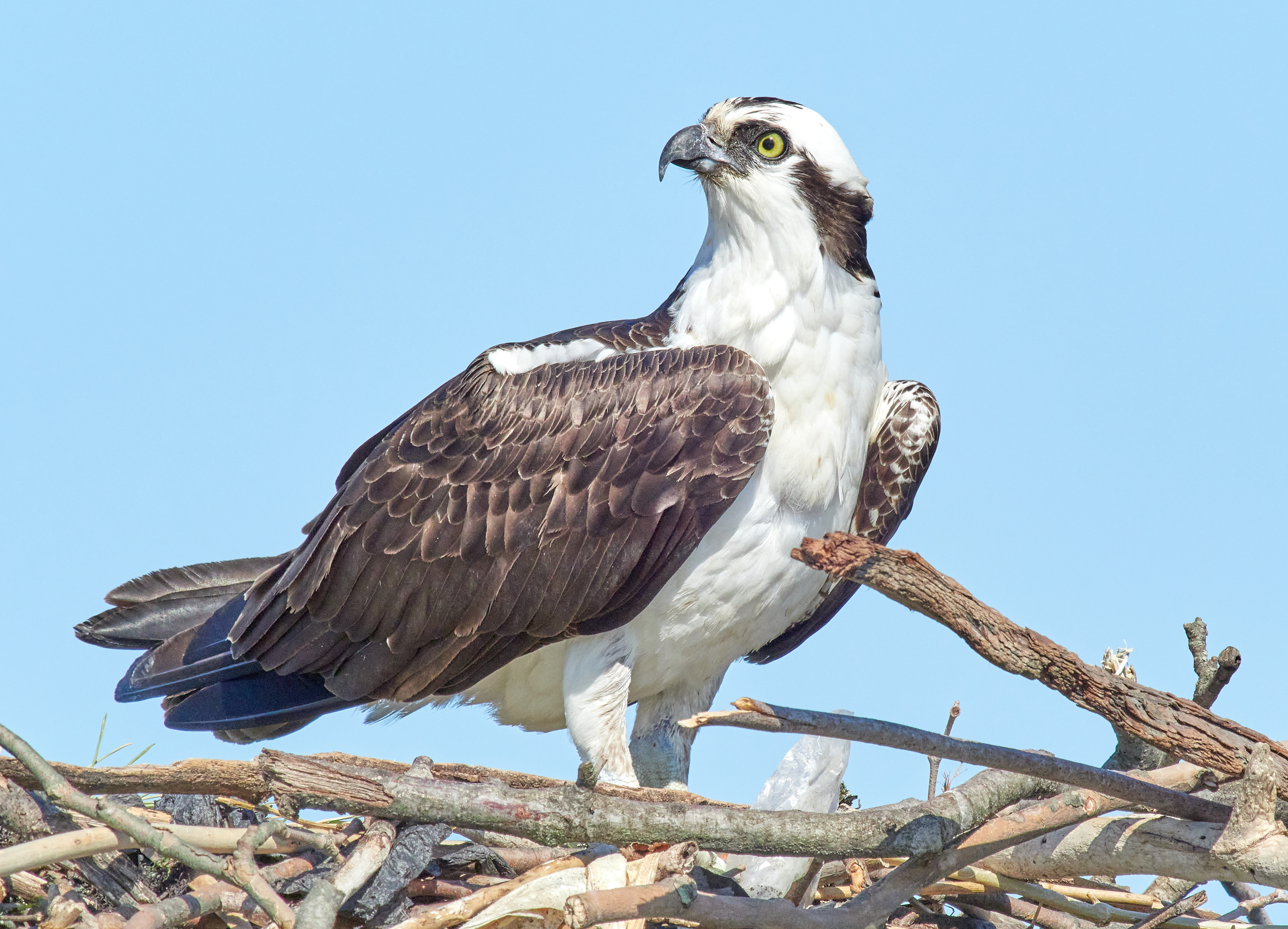

Scientific classification
- Kingdom: Animalia
- Phylum: Chordata
- Class: Aves
- Order: Accipitriformes
- Family: Pandionidae; Sclater & Salvin, 1873
- Genus: Pandion; Savigny, 1809
- Global range of Pandion

= Pandion (bird) =

Genus of birds

Pandion is a genus of fish-eating bird of prey, known as ospreys, the only genus of the family Pandionidae. The genus Pandion is named for the mythical Greek figure of the same name. Some taxonomic arrangements place it alongside the hawks and eagles in the family Accipitridae — which itself can be regarded as making up the bulk of the order Accipitriformes — or else allied with the Falconidae into Falconiformes. The Sibley-Ahlquist taxonomy has placed it together with the other diurnal raptors in a greatly enlarged Ciconiiformes, but this results in an unnatural paraphyletic classification.

Most taxonomic treatments have regarded this genus as containing a single living species, separated into subspecies and found worldwide near water, while some treatments recognize two living species, splitting off the eastern osprey (Pandion (haliaetus) cristatus) from Australia and southeast Asia.

== Species ==
Image	Scientific name	Common name	Subspecies
	Pandion haliaetus	Osprey	P. haliaetus haliaetus; P. haliaetus carolinensis; P. haliaetus ridgwayi; P. haliaetus cristatus

Extinct (fossil) species:

- †Pandion homalopteron Warter 1976
- †Pandion lovensis Becker 1985
- †Pandion pannonicus Kessler 2018
