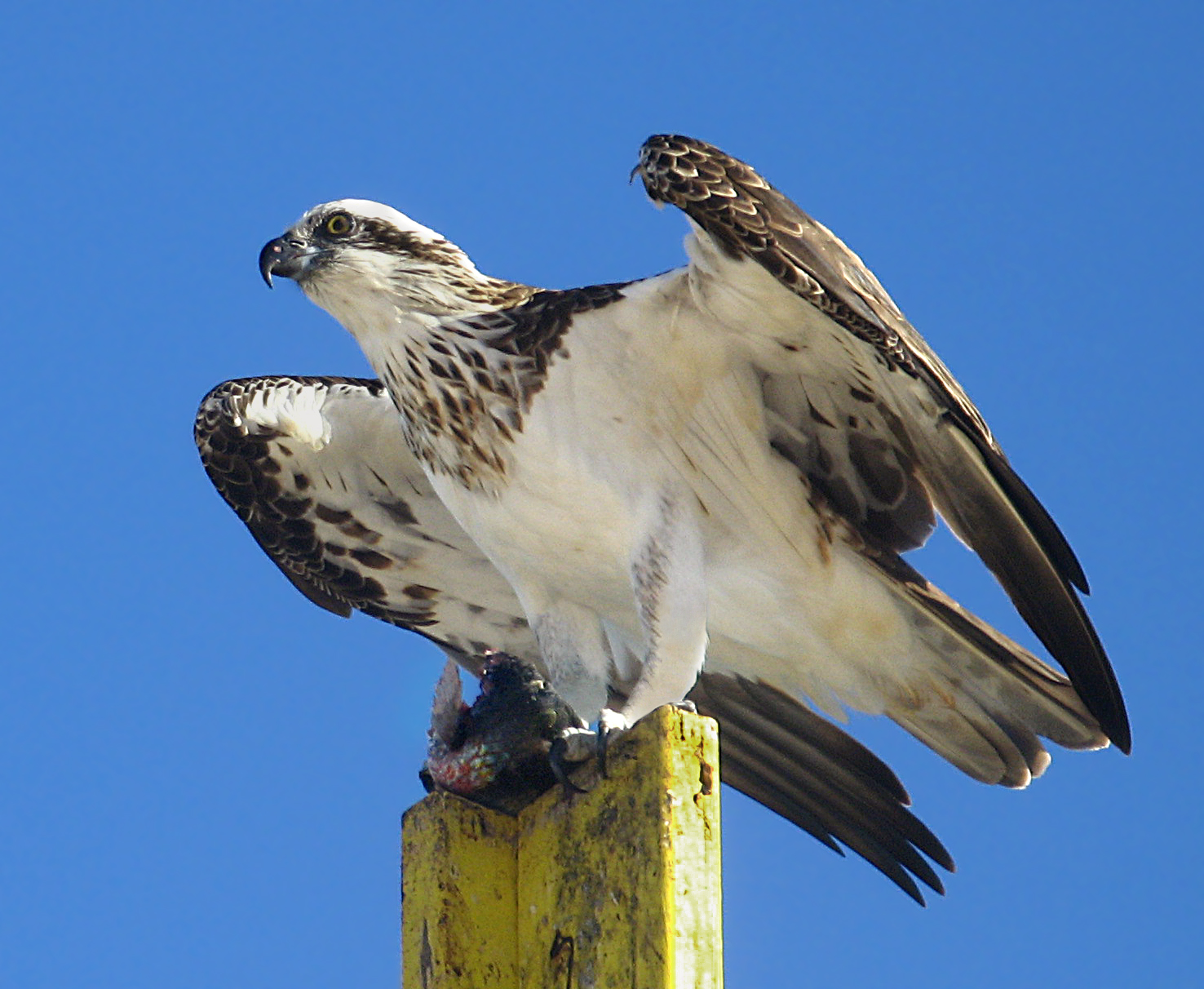

Scientific classification
- Kingdom: Animalia
- Phylum: Chordata
- Class: Aves
- Order: Accipitriformes
- Family: Pandionidae
- Genus: Pandion
- Species: P. haliaetus
- Subspecies: P. h. cristatus

Trinomial name
- Pandion haliaetus cristatus (Vieillot, 1816)

Synonyms
- Pandion cristatus

= Eastern osprey =

Subspecies of bird

The eastern osprey (Pandion haliaetus cristatus) is a diurnal, fish-eating bird of prey. It lives in Oceania at coastal regions of the Australian continent, the Indonesian islands, New Guinea, and the Philippines. It is usually sedentary and pairs breed at the same nest site, building up a substantial structure on dead trees or limbs. The subspecies resides in a habitat close to coasts and estuaries that provide opportunities for fishing.

The eastern osprey's diet consists mostly of vertebrate fish species. It possesses specialised physical characteristics and exhibits unique behaviour to assist in hunting and catching prey.

== Taxonomy ==
A description as species Buteo cristatus was published in 1816 by the French ornithologist Louis Vieillot, which came to be cited as a subspecies or race of a widely distributed species. The epithet cristatus is derived from the Latin for 'crested' in reference to the stiff tuft of feathers that extend from the nape. The subspecific treatment Pandion haliaetus cristatus distinguishes the crest from other subspecies of P. haliaetus, the name taken from ancient Greek haliaietos for 'sea eagle'.

Later authors described the regional population as separate species—Pandion leucocephalus Gould, J. 1838 and Pandion gouldi Kaup, J.J. 1847—or as subspecies—Pandion haliaetus australis Burmeister, K.H.K. 1850 and Pandion haliaetus melvillensis Mathews, G.M. 1912.

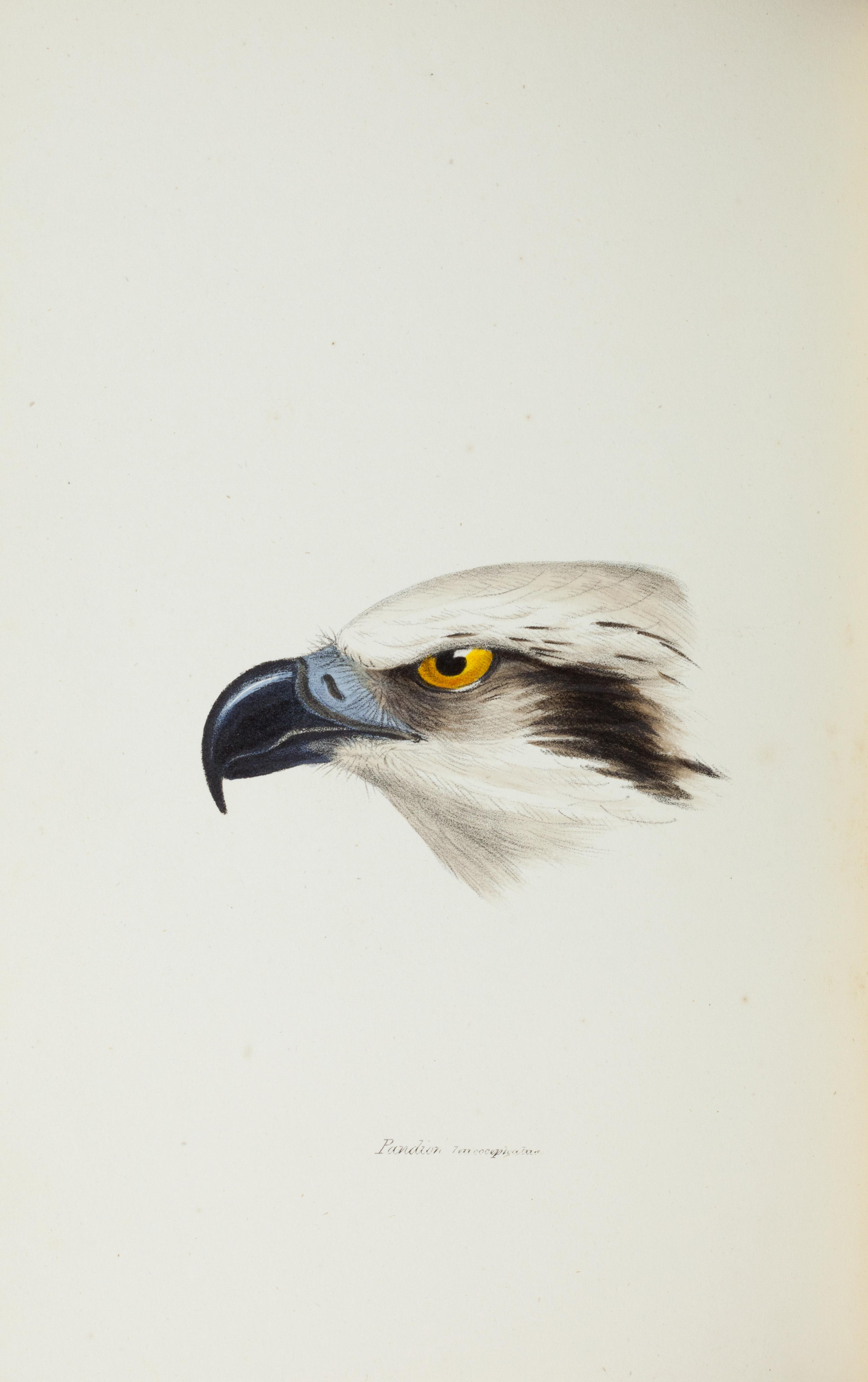
Illustration of head by Eilzabeth Gould, published 1838

Gould's description identified several characteristics that distinguished his new species from widespread Pandion haliaetus, based on specimens collected in Tasmania, Rottnest Island in the west, and Port Essington; the accompanying lithograph illustrating the species—published in the Synopsis (1838) to Birds of Australia—was executed by Elizabeth Gould.

Some authorities maintain a treatment of the "eastern osprey" population as one of four subspecies of Pandion haliaetus, the only extant species of the genus and family. When specimens and observations of new populations were published in the nineteenth century, many authors described these as new species, revisions around the beginning of the twenty first century began to suggest that status as a full species was warranted.

The Australian Faunal Directory recognises a full species treatment, citing a 2008 revision that noted genetic distance comparable to closely related species of Hieraeetus and Aquila (Wink, et al., 2004) and minor but consistent distinctions in morphology and plumage colour. Behavioural differences between the three contentious populations include this species residence at marine habitat, whereas the North American population is found breeding and colonising sites near freshwater.

In 2022, it was considered a defunct species by the IOC, due to its low genetic divergences and absence in morphological differences.

This species is known by the common name osprey, or distinguished when necessary as the eastern osprey, other names include fish hawk and white-headed osprey. Gould noted the informal vernacular used after settlement of Australia, the 'Little Fish-Hawk' in New South Wales and 'Fish-Hawk' recorded at the Swan River Colony by John Gilbert; the extant names for the species were Joor-jout at Port Essington and another in southwest Australia, transliterated from the Nyungar language; this latter name has proposed for common use in southwest Australia as yoondoordo [pronounced yoon’door’daw].

== Description ==
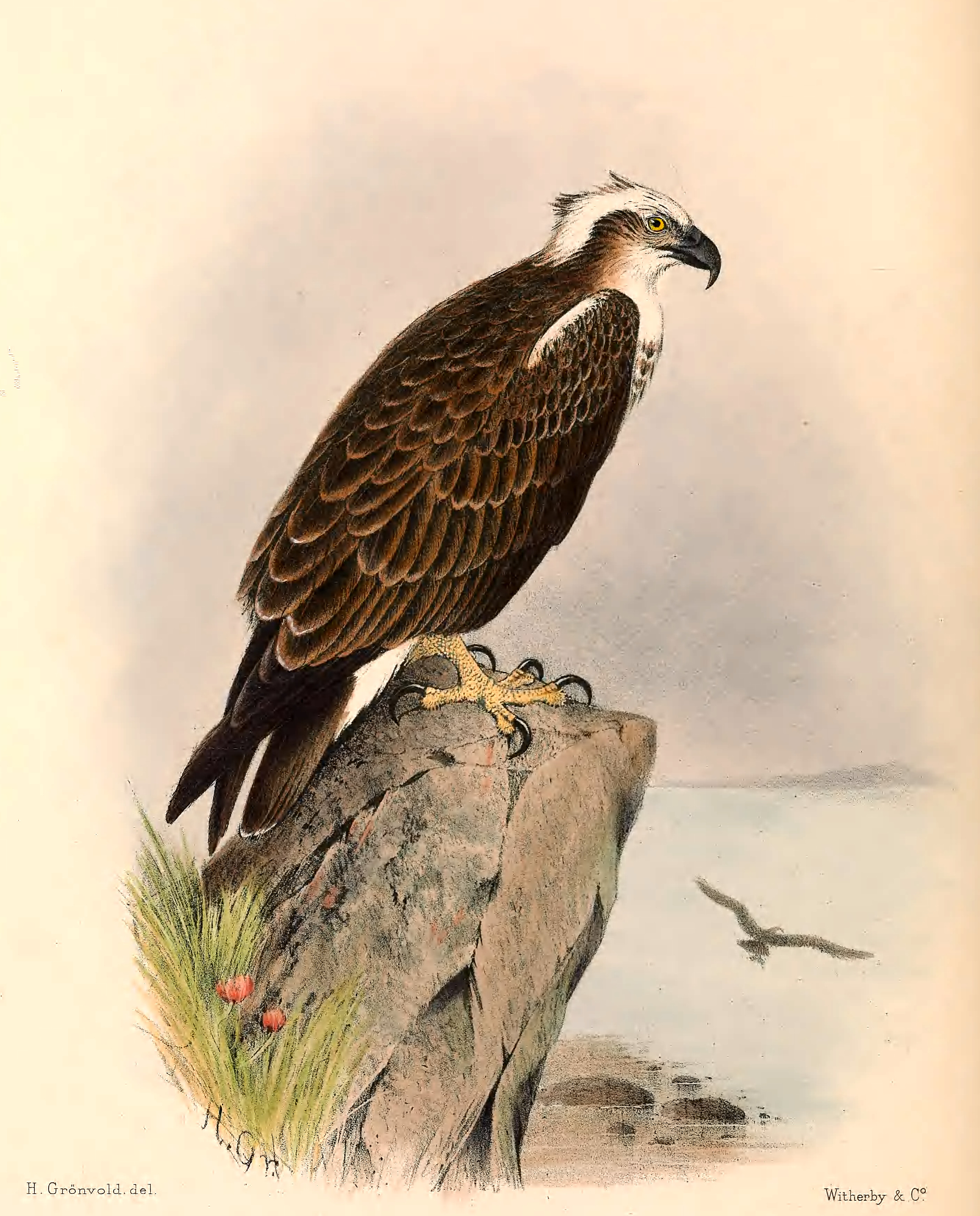
illustration by Henrik Grönvold in Mathews, The birds of Australia, 1916

Pandion cristatus, comparable in size as a medium-sized raptor or large hawk, occurs near the coast and large water bodies and is highly adapted to hunt and capture marine animals. The plumage is dark brown on the upper surfaces, and pale at the head and lower parts. The throat is white, a black line extends from this through the eye to a dark patch around the ear, demarcating this from the pale colour at the head. When not in flight, the feathers at the crown form a small crest. The breast is dappled with brownish patches, lacing below the neck, this is darker and more strongly banded in the female. The female of the species also tends to be larger. The wing measurements of the females range from 410 to 478 millimetres, males are 391 to 470 mm. The weight of the female is 1.2 to 1.6 kilograms, males are 0.9 to 1.2 kg. The size range of the black bill is 29 to 35 millimetres, and the upper mandible is acutely hooked. The legs and feet of the species are strong and a light grey or white colour. The pattern of the scales at the tarsus is reticulate. The irides are yellow. The juveniles resemble adults, although the iris colour is a darker orange-yellow and plumage is distinguishable in multiple and subtle ways. In flight, the eastern osprey has bowed wings with narrow primary feathers that are angled and separate, giving a fingered appearance to the observer below. The eyes are set toward the front of the head, which along with the neck is proportionally small. The species swivels and cranes its neck while observing its surroundings in a curious and characteristic manner. The osprey resembles the white-bellied sea eagle Haliaeetus leucogaster, which has similar habitat and range, although the adult size is only that of the larger species' juvenile; the wings of an osprey are sharply angled rather than the up-swept outline of the soaring eagle.

Ospreys differ in several respects from other diurnal birds of prey, toes are of equal length, its tarsi are reticulate, and its talons are rounded, rather than grooved. The eastern and western osprey (Pandion) and owls (Strigiformes) are the only hunters whose outer toe is reversible, allowing them to grasp their prey with two toes in front and two behind. This is particularly helpful when they grasp slippery fish.

== Distribution and habitat ==
The states and territories of Australia where the species is recorded as occurring are Western Australia, the Northern Territory, Queensland, New South Wales, South Australia and Tasmania, The range is a narrow strip at the coast and offshore islands, although it is occasionally found at open river systems and beyond tidal plains. Visits to inland regions from the north during the wet season may occur in years of heavier rainfall. On this continent it is mainly sedentary, non-migratory, in contrast to the other subspecific populations of Pandion haliaetus. They occur patchily around the coastline, although it is a non-breeding visitor to eastern Victoria and Tasmania. There is a 1,000 km (620 mi) gap, corresponding with the coast of the Nullarbor Plain, between its westernmost breeding site in South Australia and the nearest breeding sites at the southwest of Australia. The species had been reported as uncommon in the southeast of Australia.

Other regions inhabited by the species at the Philippines, Indonesia and New Guinea. Seasonal visitors to Sulawesi arrive from the south, and these are presumed to have migrated from the north of Australia.

The tree selected as a roost or nest site in Australia is a large eucalypt. They may be seen in flight over a variety of habitats occurring between their residence and hunting waters.

== Behaviour ==
The species is solitary or paired with a breeding partner, the association of several individuals in family groups are unusual records. They are a diurnal species, ranging out from a nest or perch over water bodies during daylight, but have been recorded hunting at night. Their flight may be high, soaring over and surveying the water, or quartering closer to the surface; some flight is seemingly unrelated to hunting.

=== Hunting ===
The diet is largely local species of fish, although a favoured target in Australia is known to be mullet when available. Occasional records are given for other marine life—sea snakes, molluscs and crustaceans—and for terrestrial species of reptiles, insects, birds and mammals. They are known to capture sea birds in flight.

Ospreys have vision that is well adapted to detecting underwater objects from the air. Prey is first sighted when the eastern osprey is 10 to 40 metres above the water, after which the bird hovers momentarily then plunges feet first with wings raised; a large splash is made as it enters the water. The descent toward their prey may be done in stages, and they may immerse themselves up to a depth of 1 metre. After seizing their target they use heavy wing beats to rise from the water's surface, resuming a regular action with the fish being carried head first toward the shore. The prey is "slung torpedo-fashion" with a leading foot behind the head and the other clasping behind, this aligning habit distinguishes Pandion from indifferent clutching of prey by fishing eagles. Their large prey is not swallowed immediately, instead being butchered at a perch or nest site outside the breeding season.

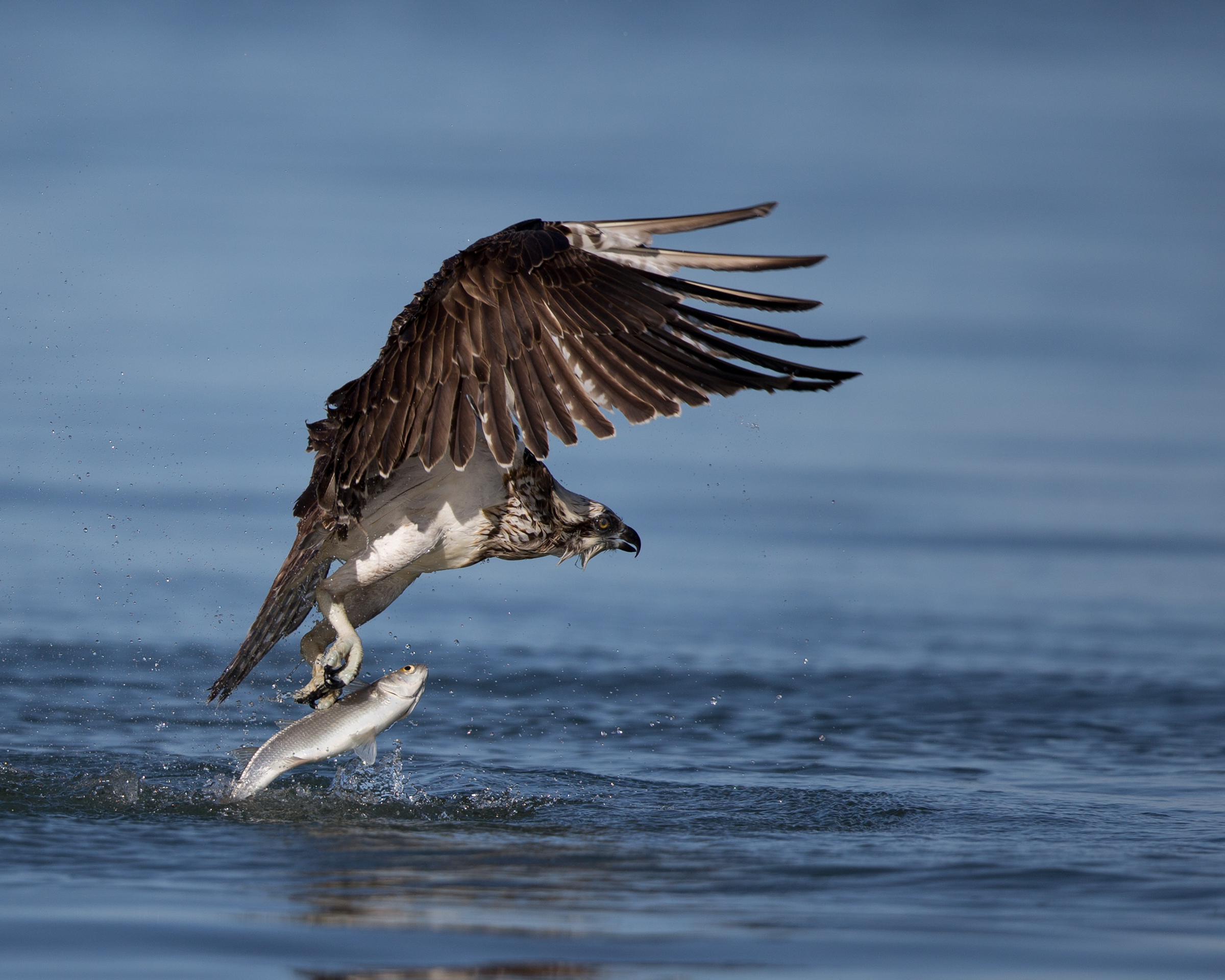
osprey with catch at Peel Harvey Estuary

The genus Pandion has several adaptations that suit its piscivorous lifestyle, these include reversible outer toes, sharp spicules on the underside of the toes, closable nostrils to keep out water during dives, and backwards-facing scales on the talons which act as barbs to help hold its catch. The osprey has dense plumage which is oily and prevents its feathers from getting waterlogged.

=== Reproduction ===
Rocky outcrops just offshore are used in Rottnest Island off the coast of Western Australia, where there are 14 or so similar nesting sites of which five to seven are used in any one year. Many are renovated each season, and some have been used for 70 years. The nest is a large heap of sticks, driftwood, turf or seaweed that is usually built in the fork of a dead tree or limb, cliff faces are also utilised. trees, rocky outcrops, utility poles, artificial platforms or offshore islets. Continually occupied nest structures may reach up to two metres in height. Nests can be as wide as 2 meters and weighing about 135 kg.

Generally, eastern ospreys reach sexual maturity and begin breeding around the age of three to four years.

Eastern ospreys usually mate for life, although polyandry has been recorded in several instances. The breeding period varies according to local seasons: this begins between September and October in southern Australia, April to July in northern Australia and June–August in southern Queensland. In spring the pair begins a five-month period of partnership to raise their young. The clutch size is usually two to three eggs, sometimes up to four, and are able to brood twice in a season. These are laid within a month, and relies on the size of the nest to conserve heat. The egg shell is white or buff with bold splotches and spots of reddish-brown, sometimes so dark as to be black; purple or grey blotches may appear beneath the surface of the shell. The egg measurements are about 62 x 45 millimetres and weigh about 65 grams. The eggs are incubated for about 35–43 days to hatching.

The newly hatched chicks weigh 50 to 60 grams and fledge in 8 to 10 weeks. A study on Kangaroo Island had an average time between hatching and fledging of 69 days. The same study found an average of 0.66 young fledged per year per occupied territory, and 0.92 young fledged per year per active nest. Some 22% of surviving young either remained on the island or returned at maturity to join the breeding population. When food is scarce, the first chicks to hatch are most likely to survive. The typical lifespan is 7–10 years, though rarely individuals can grow to as old as 20–25 years.

A nest examined in 1902 found fish skeletons at the edge and a seaside plant "pig-face" (Mesembryanthemum) in full growth.

== Status and conservation ==
The species is listed as vulnerable in South Australia, under the National Parks and Wildlife Act 1972. There is evidence for regional decline in the state, where former territories at locations in the Spencer Gulf and along the lower Murray River have been vacant for decades. Nesting sites on the Eyre Peninsula and Kangaroo Island are vulnerable to unmanaged coastal recreation and encroaching urban development. As of 2024 there were estimated to be only 50 breeding pairs left in SA, mostly on islands and isolated stretches of coast, reflecting a 26 per cent population decrease over 10 years. After finding that foxes had been stealing eggs, the Friends of Osprey conservation group and National Parks and Wildlife Service South Australia installed towers to provide an elevated platform for ospreys to nest. Their efforts were rewarded on Tumby Island, where a chick hatched in October 2023. Since seven artificial nesting platforms were installed across mainland Yorke Peninsula, where there were no breeding pairs, and the Eyre Peninsula, osprey breeding territories increased to five in 2022, up from one in 2017. In 2024, 14 chicks had hatched from the artificial platforms, and in June 2024 a further six platforms were erected on the Eyre Peninsula.

In New South Wales, the osprey is listed as vulnerable under the Biodiversity Conservation Act 2016 (NSW). The population had declined until around the 1970s, when they began to thrive in northern area of the state, and started expanding their range southwards. In July 2023, there were 13 breeding pairs on the Central Coast of NSW, the highest number ever observed in the region, and they were second most common raptor there, after the White-breasted Sea Eagle. There is a nest of ospreys nesting in one of the light towers of Central Coast Stadium. The breeding pair produced chicks every year from 2016 until July 2023, when a video of the osprey family was posted on Facebook. The parents were named Rosie and Hutch by patrons of the stadium.

As of July 2024, the bird is not listed or protected by legislation in other states.

In Western Australia, it is relatively common in the north and less frequently recorded in the south. A 1902 report by Alexander Milligan of a breeding pair in the southwest region was published in The Emu, and a description of a nest with two eggs located at Cape Mentelle which had been photographed eleven years earlier by A. J. Campbell. One egg was taken for deposit at the state's museum by Milligan and along with the museum's director, B. H. Woodward, charged the warden of the cave system with protection of the site.

The species is rare in Victoria and now absent from Tasmania.
