= Pandion pannonicus =

Pandion pannonicus Temporal range: Chattian

Scientific classification
- Kingdom: Animalia
- Phylum: Chordata
- Class: Aves
- Order: Accipitriformes
- Family: Pandionidae
- Genus: Pandion
- Species: †P. pannonicus

Binomial name
- †Pandion pannonicus Kessler, 2018

Extinct species of bird

Pandion pannonicus is an extinct species of osprey that inhabited what is now Hungary during the Chattian stage of the Oligocene epoch. It is one of the earliest representatives of the osprey family Pandionidae along with an undescribed species found in Egypt from the Rupelian stage.

== Taxonomy ==
The remains of P. pannonicus were discovered at the Mány-Zsámbék basin, situated between Úny and Máriahalom, Hungary. Along with fish, reptiles and mammals, fragmented remains of birds were found, including those of P. pannonicus; these finds are indicative of the site's former aquatic environment during the Oligocene.

The genus name Pandion derives from Pandíōn Πανδίων, the mythical Greek king of Athens and grandfather of Theseus, Pandion II. The specific name pannonicus references the location of the species' discovery; the remains were located in what was once the Roman province of Pannonia.

== Description ==
While other fossil species of osprey either surpass or match the present-day osprey in size, the known remains of P. pannonicus indicate a smaller size.
