= Pandion homalopteron =

Pandion homalopteron Temporal range: Middle Miocene

Scientific classification
- Domain: Eukaryota
- Kingdom: Animalia
- Phylum: Chordata
- Class: Aves
- Order: Accipitriformes
- Family: Pandionidae
- Genus: Pandion
- Species: †P. homalopteron

Binomial name
- †Pandion homalopteron Warter, 1976

Extinct species of bird

Pandion homalopteron is an extinct species of Pandion that lived during the Middle Miocene.

== Distribution ==
Pandion homalopteron is known from the Temblor Formation of California.
