= Fejér County 3rd constituency =

Constituency in Hungary (2012-)

Fejér County 3rd constituency (Bicske)
- Constituency for the National Assembly
- Location of Fejér county 03 within Fejér county

- Location of Fejér county within Hungary
- County: Fejér
- Electorate: 76,732 (2022)
- Major settlements: Bicske

Current constituency
- Created: 2011 (modified 2024)
- Party: Tisza Party
- Member: Viktória Bögi
- Elected: 2026

The 3rd constituency of Fejér County (Hungarian: Fejér megyei 03. számú országgyűlési egyéni választókerület) is one of the single member constituencies of the National Assembly, the national legislature of Hungary. The constituency standard abbreviation: Fejér 03. OEVK.

Since 2026, it has been represented by Viktória Bögi of the Tisza Party.

== Geography ==
The 3rd constituency is located in north-eastern part of Fejér County.

=== List of municipalities ===
The constituency includes the following municipalities:

1. Alcsútdoboz
2. Baracska
3. Beloiannisz
4. Besnyő
5. Bicske
6. Bodmér
7. Csabdi
8. Csákvár
9. Etyek
10. Felcsút
11. Gánt
12. Gárdony
13. Gyúró
14. Kajászó
15. Kápolnásnyék
16. Mány
17. Martonvásár
18. Nadap
19. Óbarok
20. Pázmánd
21. Ráckeresztúr
22. Sukoró
23. Szár
24. Tabajd
25. Tordas
26. Újbarok
27. Vál
28. Velence
29. Vereb
30. Vértesacsa
31. Vértesboglár
32. Zichyújfalu

== Members ==
The constituency was first represented by Zoltán Tessely of the Fidesz from 2014, and he was re-elected in 2018 and 2022. In the 2026 election, Viktória Bögi of the Tisza Party was elected representative.

Election	Member	Party	%	Ref.
2014	Zoltán Tessely	Fidesz	50.43	
2018	Zoltán Tessely	Fidesz	52.97	
2022	Zoltán Tessely	Fidesz	57.34	
2026	Viktória Bögi	Tisza Party	54.27	
