= Bicske District =

Coordinates: 47.4833°N 18.6333°E

Bicske District Bicskei járás
- Districts of Hungary
- Coat of arms

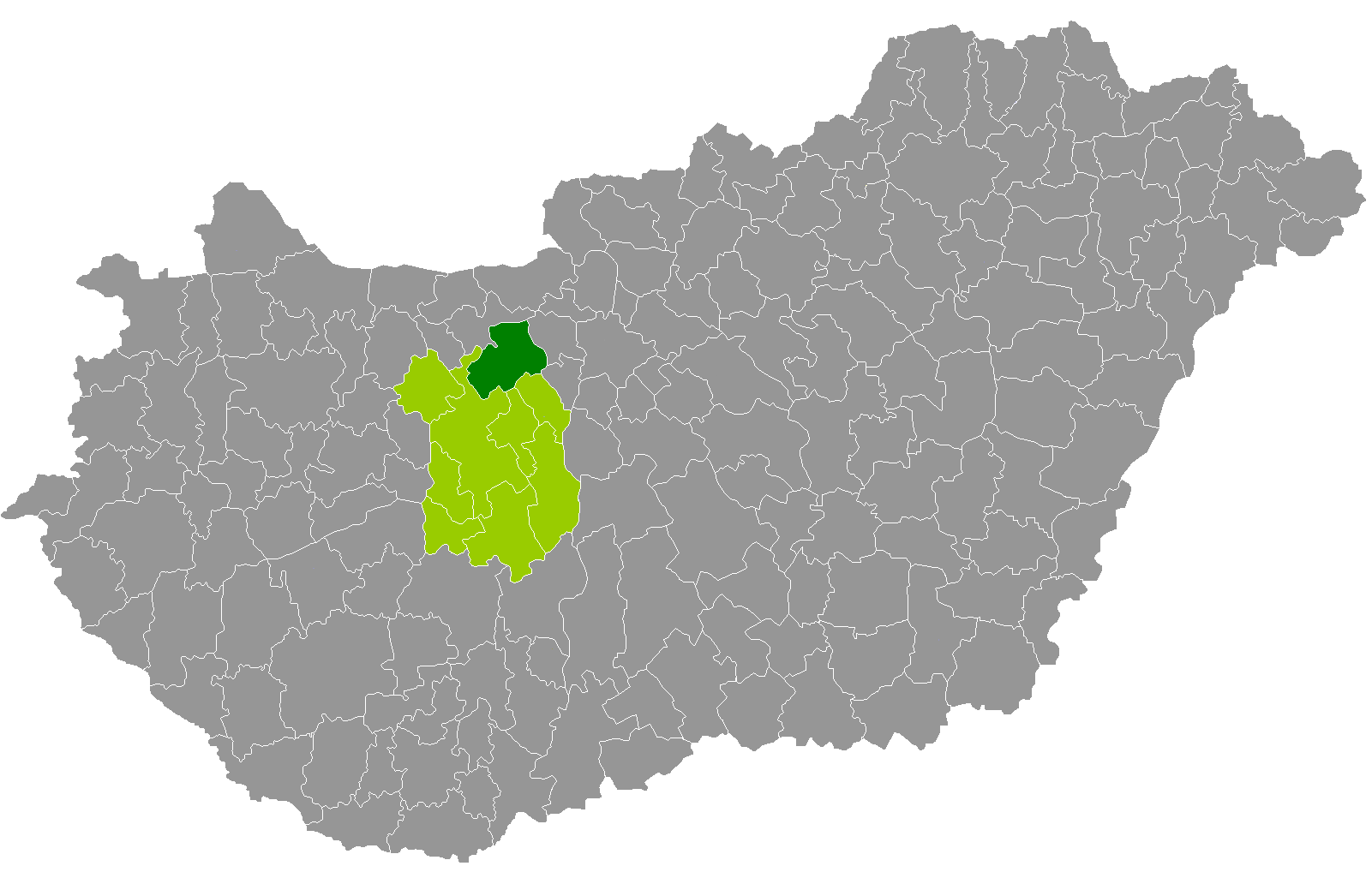
- Bicske District within Hungary and Fejér County.
- Country: Hungary
- County: Fejér
- District seat: Bicske

Area
  - Total: 578.25 km^{2} (223.26 sq mi)
  - Rank: 4th in Fejér

Population (2011 census)
  - Total: 34,370
  - Rank: 3rd in Fejér
  - Density: 66/km^{2} (170/sq mi)

Bicske (Hungarian: Bicskei járás) is a district in north-eastern part of Fejér County. Bicske is also the name of the town where the district seat is found. The district is located in the Central Transdanubia Statistical Region.

== Geography ==
Bicske District borders with Oroszlány District and Tatabánya District (Komárom-Esztergom County) to the north, Budakeszi District (Pest County) to the east, Martonvásár District, Gárdony District and Székesfehérvár District to the south, Mór District to the west. The number of the inhabited places in Bicske District is 15.

== Municipalities ==
The district has 2 towns, 1 large village and 12 villages. (ordered by population, as of 1 January 2012)

- Alcsútdoboz (1,446)
- **Bicske** (11,642) – district seat
- Bodmér (222)
- Csabdi (1,168)
- **Csákvár** (5,221)
- Etyek (4,402)
- Felcsút (1,831)
- Gánt (847) – from (Székesfehérvár District) 01.01.2015
- Mány (2,403)
- Óbarok (803)
- Szár (1,641)
- Tabajd (962)
- Újbarok (440)
- Vértesacsa (1,745)
- Vértesboglár (860)

The bolded municipalities are cities, italics municipality is large village.

== See also ==
- List of cities and towns in Hungary
