= Tokod =

- Large village
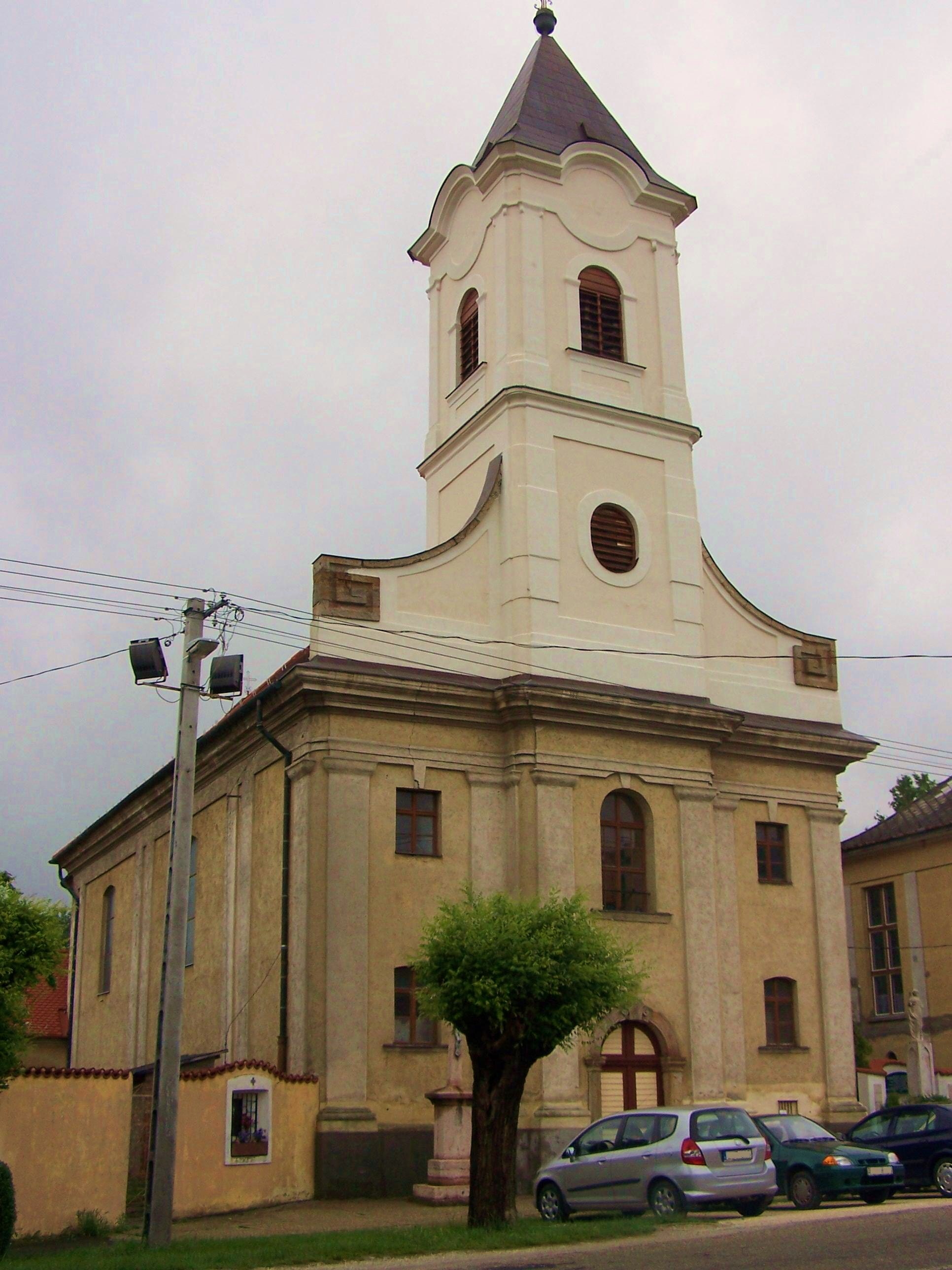

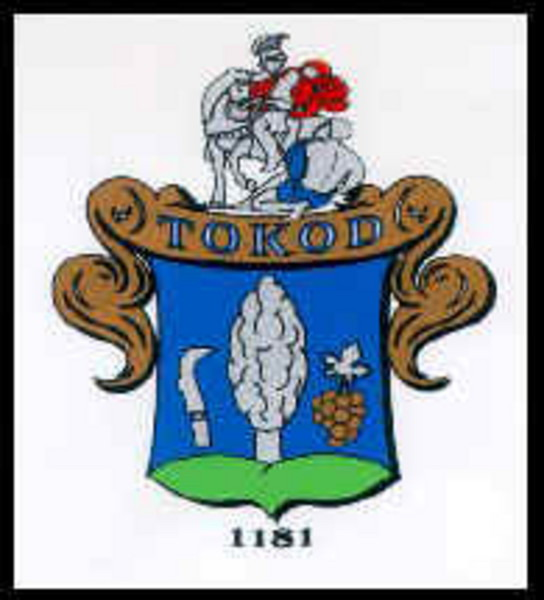
- Coat of arms

- Location of Komárom–Esztergom county in Hungary

- Location of Tokod
- Coordinates: 47.72993°N 18.67455°E
- Country: Hungary
- County: Komárom-Esztergom
- District: Esztergom

Area
  - Total: 14.9 km^{2} (5.8 sq mi)

Population (2004)
  - Total: 4,328
  - Density: 290.46/km^{2} (752.3/sq mi)
- Time zone: UTC+1 (CET)
  - Summer (DST): UTC+2 (CEST)
- Postal code: 2531
- Area code: (+36) 33

Tokod (German: Tockod) is a village in Komárom-Esztergom County, Hungary.

== Location ==
It is a large village in Komárom–Esztergom county, below the eastern slopes of the Gerecse mountain range, south of Tát and west of Dorog. Nearby larger towns are Nyergesújfalu, 12.5 km northwest and Esztergom 8.5 km northeast.

By road it is accessible from the main road 10, the centre of which is served by roads 1118 and 1119, and the part of the municipality of Ebszőnybánya is served by road 1121, which connects roads 1106 and 1119. By train, the settlement can be reached by the Esztergom–Almásfüzitő railway line, which has its own railway station (Tokod railway station) on the line.

== History ==
Its surroundings have been inhabited since ancient times. Bronze Age, Roman and Honfoglalás finds have been found in the area.

A Castrum from the late Roman period was found here, measuring 120 x 140 m, with a wall diameter of 1.5 m and 11 round towers, and with an ornate gate and bath. Remains of pottery kilns, glass and metal melting pots have been found, showing that the Romans knew and used local coal and even had prefabricated building elements.

The settlement is first mentioned in documents dating back to 1181, when its boundaries are also described. At that time it belonged to the monks of Esztergom–Szentkirály.

The settlement was completely devastated by the Tatars. In the 15th century, the crusaders of Esztergom also acquired property here. In 1543 the Turks occupied it and made it uninhabited again.

By that time the village belonged to Pilis County and became the property of the Esztergom Archbishopric, which built a church here.

The victory over the Turks was won between Tokod and Tát.

Tokod was again destroyed during the Turkish liberation battles.

At the beginning of the 18th century, the Esztergom seminary also had an estate here.

At the time of the Joseph II census of 1784–1788, the seminary also owned the settlement. At that time there were 706 inhabitants and 120 houses in the village.

The greater development of Tokod was fuelled by the discovery of coal and the industrialisation of the coal industry.

Coal mining in and around the village flourished in the first half of the 19th century.

In addition to coal, limestone was also mined on the rocky slopes of the Gerecse.

From 1892 the construction of the railway led to the construction of a glassworks and later a glass factory on the quartz sand in the area. A 'resettlement' housing estate was built for the future workers of the factories ( Tokod-Üveggyár).

In 1992 Tokodaltáró left the municipality.

== Origin of the name ==
According to tradition, the settlement was named after a warrior named Tokod.

== Public life ==
=== Mayors ===
- 1990–1994: László Csipke (independent)
- 1994–1998: József Soós (independent)
- 1998–2002: Mihály Pánczél (independent)
- 2002–2006: Mihály Pánczél (independent)
- 2006–2010: Mihály Pánczél (independent)
- 2010–2014: Tivadar Tóth (independent)
- 2014–2019: Tivadar Tóth (independent)
- From 2019: László Bánhidi (independent)

== Population ==
In the 2011 census 85.4% of the population declared themselves as Hungarian, 1% as Gypsy, 1.1% as German, 0.2% as Romanian (14.5% did not declare; due to dual identities, the total may be higher than 100%). The religious breakdown was as follows: Roman Catholic 42%, Reformed 4.7%, Evangelical 0.4%, Greek Catholic 0.2%, non-denominational 18.8% (32.9% did not declare).

== Sport ==
The most popular sport in the town is association football. The town had one professional club, Tokodi Üveggyári SC, which played at the top level of the Hungarian football, in the 1940-41 Nemzeti Bajnokság I.

Some professional athletes also lived in the village like Bálint Korpási, Erik Torba and Adolf Bazsó.
