= Battle of Bicske =

Battle of Bicske (1578)
- Part of Ottoman–Habsburg wars
Date	26 June 1578
Location	Bicske, Hungary
Result	Ottoman victory

Belligerents
(Holy Roman Empire) Habsburg Empire: Kingdom of Hungary	Ottoman Empire

Commanders and leaders
Ferenc Nádasdyy; Pálffy Miklós	Sinan Pasha of Buda

Strength
1,600 men: 700 cavalry; 900 infantry	Unknown cavalry 500 Janissaries; 16 cannons

Casualties and losses
500 killed or missing 120 captured	Unknown

The Battle of Bicske happened on June 26, 1578, between the Ottoman army and the Habsburgs near Bicske. The Ottomans were victorious.

On June 26, the Hungarian noblemen, Ferenc Nádasdy and Pálffy Miklós, launched a raid against the Ottomans. The troops joined the Hungarians from Érsekújvár and Tata. These troops met at Komárom and set out with an army of 1,600 men, including 700 cavalry and 900 infantry. The joint Hungarian-German army set out on the evening of the same day. The Habsburgs left the infantry at Biscke and the cavalry raided Buda. The Habsburgs managed to capture thirty Ottoman horses which were grazing on the fields around Buda Castle. Celebrating this success, they left and returned to Biscke with their loot.

Hearing this, the Ottoman governor of Buda, Sinan Pasha, rode out with his army to meet the Habsburgs, bringing with him cavalry, 500 janissaries, and 16 cannons. Pálffy and Nádasdy realizing the danger, did not want to engage the Ottomans, but the soldiers wanted to fight the Ottomans. The Hungarian Hussar, Mátyás of Berhida, begged the commanders to allow him and his men to fight. Eventually, they succumbed to his pleas. The commanders then summoned the infantry at Biscke. The Habsburgs had the cavalry at the center while the infantry at the wings.

Seeing the great number of the Ottomans, the Habsburgs lost their chance to retreat and had to fight. The Ottoman launched an attack, confident in their larger force. Under pressure from the Ottomans, the Habsburgs attempted to flee and engaged in combat along the way, but they were unable to free themselves from the Turks. Nádasdy and Pálffy were unable to stop the Hussars from fleeing when the Turks opened fire with their cannons. Nádasdy was also dragged along by the runners. Pálffy stuck with the struggling infantrymen until they were able to take a breather in a forest.

The severe defeat cost the Habsburgs 500 killed or missing, including 135 German infantry, 171 Hungarian infantry and 10 Hussar from Komárom, 103 infantry from Érsekújvár, and 71 infantry from Tata. The Ottomans also capture 120 prisoners. Pálffy had to request reinforcement from Archduke Ernest of Austria because the garrison at Komárom Castle had shrunk so much. The Archduke conveyed his sadness over the loss, but he also advised King Rudolf to remove Pálffy from the Komárom Captaincy and bring him before a military trial.

== Sources ==
- Szántai Gábor (2018), 27 June 1578 A Hungarian defeat at Bicske.
- Takáts Sándor (1979), Fighting Hungarians: images from the Turkish world : [essays] (Magyar).
- Csaba Veress (1983), Castles in the Bakony, the military history of the castles of Veszprém, Pápa and Palota (Magyar).
