= Ebed =

Ebed can refer to:

- Ebed (biblical figure), the name of two biblical figures
- Obid, Slovak village and municipality
