= 1939–40 Nemzeti Bajnokság II =

Nemzeti Bajnokság II
- Season: 1939–40
- Champions: Tokodi ÜSC (Dunántúl); Weisz Manfréd FC (Alföld); Salgótarjáni BTC (Felvidék)
- Promoted: Tokodi ÜSC (Dunántúl); Weisz Manfréd FC (Alföld); Salgótarjáni BTC (Felvidék); Diósgyőri MÁVAG (Felvidék); BSzKRT (Felvidék)

The 1939–40 Nemzeti Bajnokság II season was the 40th edition of the Nemzeti Bajnokság II.

== League table ==
=== Dunántúli group ===
Pos	Team	Pld	W	D	L	GF	GA	GD	Pts	Promotion or relegation
1	Tokodi ÜSC	26	18	4	4	54	28	+26	40	Promotion to Nemzeti Bajnokság I
2	Soproni FAC	26	16	2	8	84	48	+36	34	
3	Lampart FC	26	13	5	8	58	33	+25	31	
4	Egyetértés	26	13	3	10	60	46	+14	29	
5	Soproni VSE	26	9	11	6	44	41	+3	29	
6	Pénzügyi TSC	26	11	6	9	44	40	+4	28	
7	Zuglói SE	26	9	10	7	51	50	+1	28	
8	MTK (Hungária II.)	26	13	2	11	56	60	−4	28	
9	Dorogi AC	26	9	6	11	49	58	−9	24	Relegation
10	Tatabányai SC	26	8	7	11	39	48	−9	23	Relegation
11	Érsekújvári SE	26	10	3	13	35	45	−10	23	Relegation
12	Pécsi Vasutas SK	26	6	5	15	44	65	−21	17	Relegation
13	Komáromi FC	26	5	7	14	30	51	−21	17	Relegation
14	Alba Regia AK	26	4	5	17	46	81	−35	13	Relegation

=== Alföldi group ===
Pos	Team	Pld	W	D	L	GF	GA	GD	Pts	Promotion or relegation
1	Weisz Manfréd FC	22	18	1	3	114	22	+92	37	Promotion to Nemzeti Bajnokság I
2	MÁVAG SK	22	15	3	4	71	19	+52	33	
3	UTE (Újpest II.)	22	12	3	7	61	34	+27	27	
4	Vasas SC	22	12	3	7	39	40	−1	27	
5	KEAC	22	10	6	6	39	30	+9	26	
6	FTC (Ferencváros II.)	22	9	6	7	55	31	+24	24	
7	Postás SE	22	8	7	7	43	39	+4	23	
8	Szegedi AK (Szeged II.)	22	9	4	9	40	47	−7	22	Relegation
9	Csepeli MOVE	22	8	4	10	42	31	+11	20	Relegation
10	Szentlőrinci AC	22	5	4	13	30	66	−36	14	Relegation
11	Rákoskeresztúri TE	22	3	5	14	27	90	−63	11	Relegation
12	Budakalászi MOVE TSE	22	0	0	22	11	123	−112	0	Relegation

=== Felvidéki group ===
Pos	Team	Pld	W	D	L	GF	GA	GD	Pts	Promotion or relegation
1	Salgótarjáni BTC	30	28	1	1	135	21	+114	57	Promotion to Nemzeti Bajnokság I
2	Diósgyőri MÁVAG	30	28	0	2	123	32	+91	56	Promotion to Nemzeti Bajnokság I
3	BSzKRT	30	19	5	6	99	45	+54	43	Promotion to Nemzeti Bajnokság I
4	MOVE Ózdi VTK	30	17	4	9	94	63	+31	38	
5	Salgótarjáni SE	30	16	4	10	69	54	+15	36	
6	SK Rusj Ungvár	30	17	2	11	68	56	+12	36	
7	Debreceni VSC	30	15	5	10	73	63	+10	35	
8	Budapesti VSC	30	14	4	12	63	57	+6	32	
9	Perecesi TK	30	9	9	12	44	46	−2	27	
10	Kassai SC	30	10	4	16	49	88	−39	24	
11	Nyíregyházi TVE	30	7	6	17	32	65	−33	20	Relegation
12	Ungvári AC	30	7	5	18	47	85	−38	19	Relegation
13	Losonci AFC	30	5	7	18	32	68	−36	17	Relegation
14	Munkácsi SE	30	6	4	20	22	88	−66	16	Relegation
15	Beregszászi FTC	30	6	4	20	28	118	−90	16	Relegation
16	Füleki TC	30	3	2	25	10	39	−29	8	Relegation

== Promotion playoff ==
BSzKRT SE - Debreceni VSC 2–1 (1–1)

MÁVAG - Soproni FAC 2–1 (0–0)

BSzKRT SE - MÁVAG 5–2 (3–2)

== Relegation playoff ==
MTK - Csepeli MOVE 6–1 (5–0), 2–1 (2–1)

== See also ==
- 1939–40 Nemzeti Bajnokság I
