= Anton Burghardt =

German footballer and manager

Personal information
- Full name: Anton Burghardt
- Date of birth: 9 June 1942
- Place of birth: Vértesboglár, German Reich
- Date of death: 13 September 2022 (aged 80)
- Place of death: Wesel, Germany
- Height: 1.84 m (6 ft 0 in)
- Position: Defender

Senior career*
Years	Team	Apps	(Gls)
1960–1961	Kickers Offenbach	3	(0)
1961–1962	Bayer 04 Leverkusen		
1962–1964	1. FSV Mainz 05	48	(4)
1964–1965	1. FC Pforzheim	62	(2)
1966–1968	1. FC Saarbrücken	61	(0)
1968–1971	MSV Duisburg	60	(0)
1971–1974	Eintracht Bad Kreuznach	3	(0)

Managerial career
- 1978: Rot-Weiß Lüdenscheid
- 1978–1979: Hannover 96
- 1979–1980: DSC Wanne-Eickel
- 1980–1981: Tennis Borussia Berlin
- 1981: Rot-Weiß Oberhausen
- * Club domestic league appearances and goals

Anton Burghardt (9 June 1942 – 13 September 2022) was a German football player and manager.

Burghardt made 60 appearances in the Bundesliga for MSV Duisburg during his playing career.
