= Kálmán Ternegg =

Hungarian military officer (1887–1956)

Colonel-General Kálmán Ternegg
- Born: 14 September 1887; Tát, Austria-Hungary
- Died: 10 October 1956 (aged 69); Budapest, Hungarian People's Republic
- Military career
- Allegiance: Austria-Hungary; Kingdom of Hungary
- Conflicts: World War I; World War II

Colonel-General Kálmán Ternegg (14 September 1887 – 10 October 1956) was a Hungarian military officer, who served as Commander-in-Chief of the Hungarian Air Force from 1 January 1945, during World War II.

== Life ==
Ternegg was born on 14 September 1887 at Tát, Austria-Hungary.

He died on 10 October 1956 in Budapest, Hungarian People's Republic.
