= Viktória Bögi =

Hungarian politician

Member of the National Assembly
- Assuming office 9 May 2026
- Succeeding: Zoltán Tessely
- Constituency: Fejér 3rd

Personal details
- Party: Tisza

Viktória Bögi is a Hungarian politician who was elected member of the National Assembly in 2026 representing the Fejér County 3rd constituency. She previously worked as a lawyer.
