= Tokodi Üveggyári SC =

Hungarian football club

- Full name: Tokodi Üveggyári Sport Club
- Founded: 1926
- Dissolved: 2008
- Ground: Tokodi Sportpálya
- Capacity: 2,000
Home colours

Tokodi Üveggyári Sport Club was a Hungarian football club from the town of Tokod, Hungary.

== History ==
Tokodi Üveggyári SC was founded in 1927.

Tokodi Üveggyári SC debuted in the 1940–41 season of the Hungarian League and finished ninth.

== Name Changes ==
- 1926–1951: Tokodi Üveggyári Sport Club
- 1951–?: Tokodi Üveggyári Építők
- 1956–1992: Tokodi Üveggyári Munkás SE
- 1992–2008: Tokodi Üveggyári Sport Club
- 2008: dissolved

== Honours ==
- Nemzeti Bajnokság II:
  - Winners (1): 1939–40

== Seasons ==
The table below shows the seasons of Tokodi Üveggyári SC.

Season	Tier	Club's name	Position	Pts
1926–27	3	Tokodi ÜSC	1 / 10	21
1927–28	2	Tokodi ÜSC	7 / 11	20
1928–29	2	Tokodi ÜSC	4 / 12	26
1929–30	2	Tokodi Üveggyári SC	1 / 10	31
1930–31	2	Tokod Üveggyári SC	2 / 10	29
1931–32	2	Tokod Üveggyári SC	2 / 11	30
1932–33	2	Tokodi ÜSC	3 / 14	36
1933–34	2	Tokodi Üveggyári SC	1 / 12	39
1934–35	2	Tokodi Üveggyári SC	1 / 12	37
1935–36	2	Tokodi Üveggyári SC	2 / 12	37
1936–37	2	Tokodi Üveggyári SC	2 / 12	36
1937–38	2	Tokodi ÜSC	6 / 14	31
1938–39	2	Tokodi ÜSC	5 / 14	27
1939–40	2	Tokodi ÜSC	1 / 14	40
1940–41	1	Tokodi Üveggyári SC	12 / 14	19
1941–42	2	Tokodi ÜSC	7 / 14	29
1942–43	2	Tokodi ÜSC	8 / 12	21
1943–44	2	Tokodi ÜSC	16 / 16	11
1944–45	2	Tokodi Üveggyári SC	9 / 16	7
1944–45	2	Tokodi Üveggyári SC	0 / 11	
1946–47	4	Tokodi Üveggyári SC	1 / 14	
1947–48	3	Tokodi Üveggyári SC	3 / 16	43
1948–49	3	Tokodi Üveggyári SC	2 / 16	40
1949–50	2	Tokodi ÜMSE	15 / 16	20
1950	3	Tokodi ÜMSE	12 / 16	11
1951	3	Tokodi Üveggyári Építők	1 / 10	23
1952	3	Tokodi Üveggyári Építők	7 / 14	25
1953	3	Tokodi Üveggyár	8 / 18	24
1954	3	Tokodi Üveggyár	10 / 16	33
1955	3	Tokodi Üveggyár	11 / 16	27
1956	3	Tokodi Üveggyári Építők	14 / 16	20
1957	3	Tokodi Üveggyári SC	7 / 9	13
1957–58	4	Tokodi Üveggyár SC	5 / 14	30
1958–59	4	Tokodi Üveggyár SC	2 / 13	36
1959–60	4	Tokodi Üveggyár SC	5 / 16	31
1960–61	4	Tokodi Üveggyár	8 / 15	28
1961–62	4	Tokodi Üveggyár	6 / 17	31
1962–63	4	Tokodi Üveggyár	3 / 18	42
1963	5	Tokodi Üveg	7 / 8	6
1964	5	Tokodi Üveg	6 / 14	31
1965	5	Tokodi Üveggyári SC	6 / 16	27
1966	5	Tokodi Üveggyár	9 / 16	25
1967	5	Tokodi Üveggyár	2 / 14	40
1968	5	Tokodi Üveg	6 / 16	32
1969	5	Tokodi Üveggyár	5 / 18	40
1970	5	Tokodi Üveggyár	4 / 7	12
1970–71	5	Tokodi Üveggyár	7 / 14	28
1971–72	5	Tokodi Üveggyár	1 / 13	36
1972–73	4	Tokodi Építők	15 / 16	17
1973–74	5	Tokodi Üveggyári Építők	2 / 16	40
1974–75	4	Tokodi Üveggyári Építők	7 / 16	29
1975–76	4	Tokodi Üveggyár	13 / 16	21
1976–77	4	Tokodi Üveggyár	8 / 16	32
1977–78	4	Tokodi Üveggyár	6 / 16	37
1978–79	3	Tokodi Üveggyár	2 / 16	43
1979–80	3	Tokodi Üveggyári SC	6 / 16	38
1980–81	3	Tokodi Üveggyár	5 / 16	38
1981–82	4	Tokodi Üveggyár	6 / 16	37
1982–83	4	Tokod	4 / 16	41
1983–84	4	Tokodi Üveggyár	9 / 17	29
1984–85	4	Tokodi Üveggyár	7 / 16	29
1985–86	4	Tokodi Üveggyár	6 / 18	40
1986–87	4	Tokodi Üveggyár	6 / 16	37
1987–88	4	Tokodi Üveggyár SC	10 / 16	30
1988–89	4	Tokod	7 / 14	27
1989–90	4	Tokod	10 / 14	25
1990–91	4	Tokod	8 / 15	30
1991–92	4	Tokod	5 / 14	30
1992–93	4	Tokodi Üveggyári MSE	16 / 16	-
1994–95	5	Tokodi Üveggyár SC	7 / 14	37
1995–96	5	Tokodi Üveggyár	2 / 13	53
1996–97	5	Tokodi Üveggyár	4 / 15	49
1997–98	6	Tokodi Üveggyár	2 / 17	79
1998–99	7	Tokodi Üveggyár	3 / 14	57
1999–00	7	Tokodi Üveggyár	1 / 14	59
2000–01	7	Tokodi Üveggyár	5 / 12	38
2001–02	7	Tokodi Üveggyár	3 / 11	52
2002–03	6	Tokodi Üveggyár SE	9 / 13	24
2003–04	6	Tokodi Üveggyár SC	7 / 14	38
2004–05	6	Tokodi Üveggyár SC	5 / 14	38
2005–06	5	Tokodi Üveggyár SE	12 / 13	8
2006–07	5	Tokodi Üveggyár	11 / 14	26
2007–08	5	Tokodi Üveggyár SC	0 / 16	
