= Pilismarót =

Pilismarót Castra ad Herculem (in Latin)
- Village
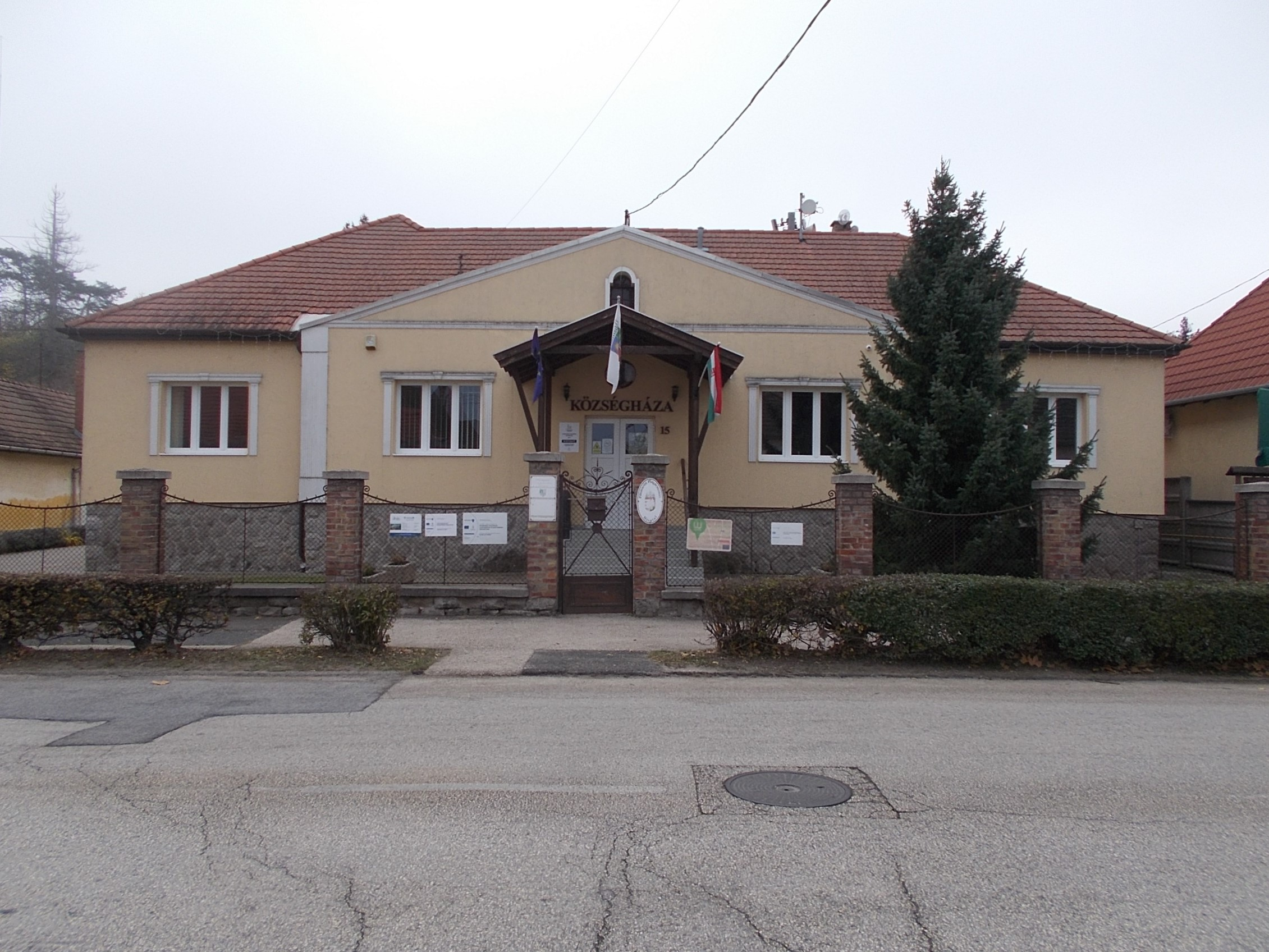
- Village hall

- Flag Coat of arms

- Location of Pilismarót
- Coordinates: 47.78404°N 18.87552°E
- Country: Hungary
- Region: Central Transdanubia
- County: Komárom-Esztergom
- District: Esztergom

Area
  - Total: 44.55 km^{2} (17.20 sq mi)

Population (1 January 2025)
  - Total: 2,166
  - Density: 48.62/km^{2} (125.9/sq mi)
- Time zone: UTC+1 (CET)
  - Summer (DST): UTC+2 (CEST)
- Postal code: 2028
- Area code: (+36) 33
- Website: www.pilismarot.hu

Pilismarót is a village in Komárom-Esztergom county, Hungary. It is located on the right bank of the Danube.

== History ==
The history of the village goes back to the prehistoric age: precious findings turned up in its outskirts and the most significant is the Roman material of finds. The village was situated at the limes and it was called Ad Herculem. It was reckoned to be a big colony with a strong fortress and watchtowers. Later the history of the village became interwoven with the religious orders: King Béla IV donated it to the Benedictines and then King Sigismund endowed the provostship of Esztergom with it. From 1493 till the abolishment of the order it was in the possession of the Paulines. According to the tradition the stream called Malomvölgyi-patak (named after the mills of the village) was the favourite place of King Matthias for rest and feast after the huntings that started from the castle of Visegrád. The other stream in the Miklós-deák-valley was said to be frequently visited by the scribe of King Matthias.

The mansion standing among trees on the main road was built by Gusztáv Heckenast in 1860. It is a one-storey villa with wooden pillars built in romantic style. In accordance with the tradition Ferenc Deák worked out the text of the Compromise of 1867 in this mansion, however it is not proven. It is known that many outstanding people visited this place and almost every famous poets and writers of the era turned up in the villa of the printer.

The Catholic church with a frontal tower was built in 1821 in the centre of the village. The statue of the couple Dobozi can be seen on the square in front of the church. Their story says that Mihály Dobozi was escaping with his wife from the Turks who burnt their house down when his horse collapsed. In this hopeless situation Dobozi stabbed his wife at her request then he fell in the inadequate struggle too. This case is attached to the Basaharc-ridge (basaharc means struggle with a pasha).

The Calvinist church, which is the oldest building of the village, was built on the hilltop and can be seen from a great distance. Originally a catholic church built for the Paulines on a medieval base, it was put into the possession of the Calvinists in 1786 when the so-called "Hatter King" Emperor Joseph II dissolved the religious orders.

The beach of the village has been popular for long time because it has been one of the best beaches at the Hungarian reach of the Danube. It was also called the Lido of the Danube from the 1930s and summer resorts were established here.
