= Tata District =

Coordinates: 47.6500°N 18.3333°E

Tata District Tatai járás
- Districts of Hungary
- Coat of arms

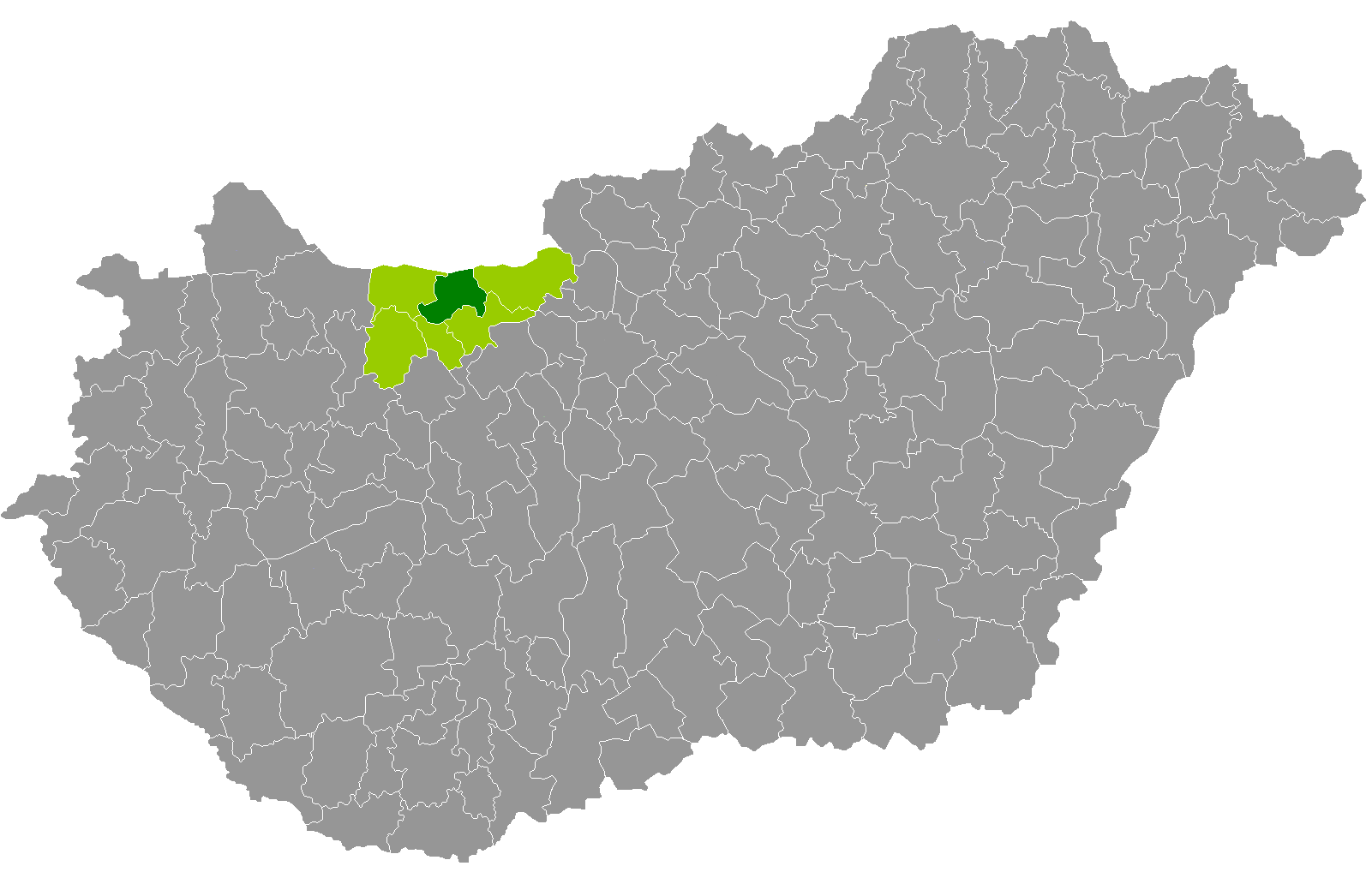
- Tata District within Hungary and Komárom-Esztergom County.
- Country: Hungary
- County: Komárom-Esztergom
- District seat: Tata

Area
  - Total: 306.71 km^{2} (118.42 sq mi)
  - Rank: 5th in Komárom-Esztergom

Population (2011 census)
  - Total: 38,783
  - Rank: 4th in Komárom-Esztergom
  - Density: 126/km^{2} (330/sq mi)
- Website: Official website

Tata (Hungarian: Tatai járás) is a district in northern part of Komárom-Esztergom County. Tata is also the town where the district seat is found. The district is located in the Central Transdanubia statistical region.

== Geography ==
Tata District borders with the Slovak Nitra Region to the north, Esztergom District to the east, Tatabánya District and Oroszlány District to the south, Komárom District to the west. The number of the inhabited places in Tata District is 10.

== Municipalities ==
The district has one town (bolded) and nine villages. (ordered by population, as of 1 January 2013)

- Baj (2,754)
- Dunaalmás (1,542)
- Dunaszentmiklós (411)
- Kocs (2,536)
- Naszály (2,335)
- Neszmély (1,325)
- Szomód (2,005)
- Tardos (1,615)
- **Tata** (23,726) – district seat
- Vértestolna (493)

== Demographics ==
Religion in Tata District (2011 census)
1. Catholic Church (34.9%)
2. Greek Catholicism (0.30%)
3. Calvinism (16.8%)
4. Lutheranism (1.10%)
5. Other religions (1.10%)
6. Non-religious (16.7%)
7. Atheists (1.40%)
8. Undeclared (27.7%)

In 2011, it had a population of 38,783 and the population density was 126/km^{2}.

Year	County population	Change
2011	38,783	n/a

=== Ethnicity ===
Besides the Hungarian majority, the main minorities are the German (approx. 1,700), Slovak (500) and Roma (250).

Total population (2011 census): 38,783
Ethnic groups (2011 census): Identified themselves: 36,379 persons:

- Hungarians: 33,392 (91.79%)
- Germans: 1,713 (4.70%)
- Slovaks: 447 (1.23%)
- Others and indefinable: 827 (2.27%)

Approx. 2,500 persons in Tata District did not declare their ethnic group at the 2011 census.

=== Religion ===
Religious adherence in the county according to 2011 census:

- Catholic – 13,659 (Roman Catholic – 13,532; Greek Catholic – 121);
- Reformed – 6,497;
- Evangelical – 424;
- other religions – 433;
- Non-religious – 6,490;
- Atheism – 537;
- Undeclared – 10,743.

== See also ==
- List of cities and towns in Hungary
