= Esztergom District =

Coordinates: 47.7833°N 18.7333°E

Esztergom District Esztergomi járás
- Districts of Hungary
- Flag Coat of arms

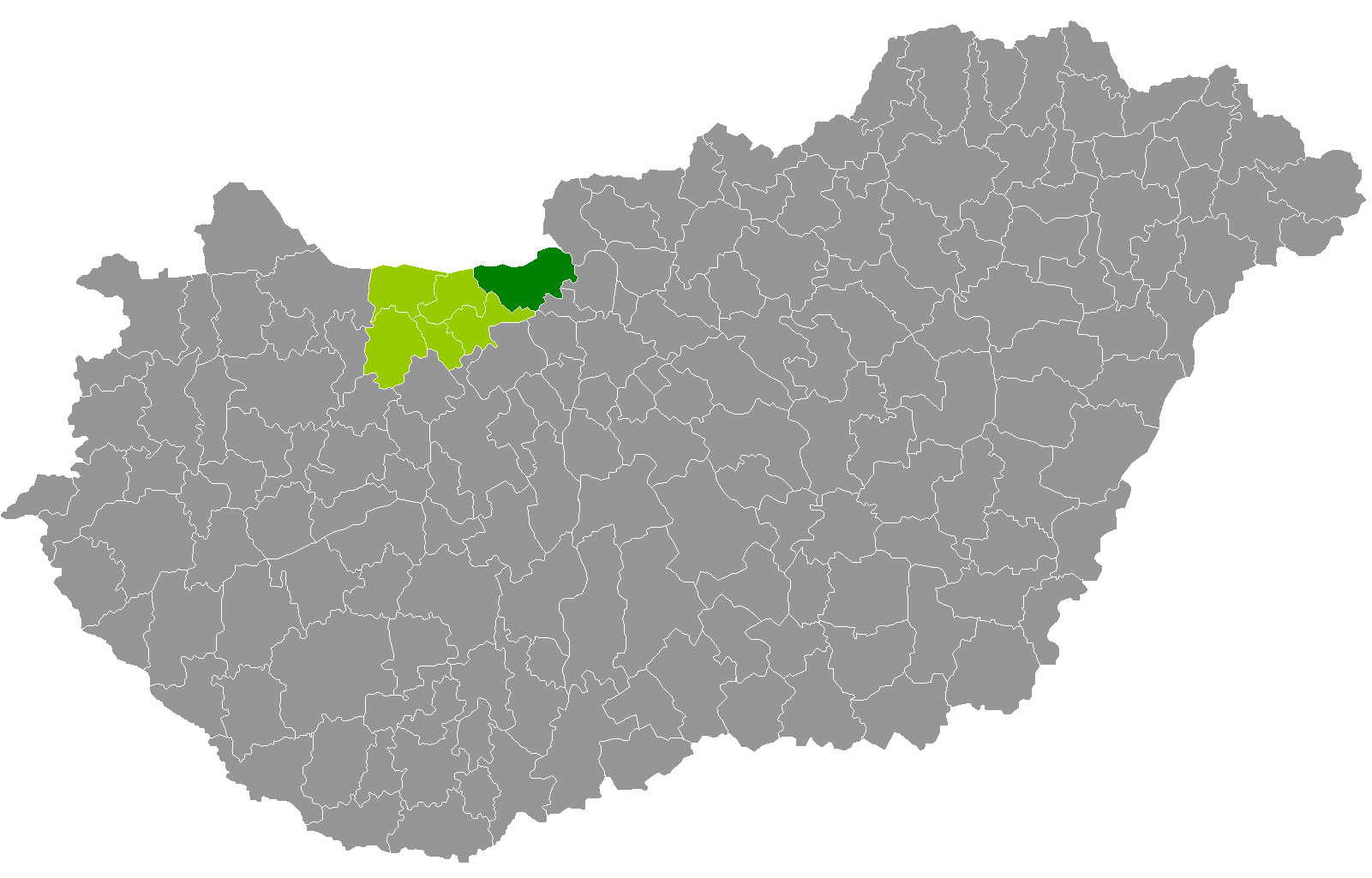
- Esztergom District within Hungary and Komárom-Esztergom County.
- Country: Hungary
- County: Komárom-Esztergom
- District seat: Esztergom

Area
  - Total: 537.26 km^{2} (207.44 sq mi)
  - Rank: 1st in Komárom-Esztergom

Population (2011 census)
  - Total: 93,784
  - Rank: 1st in Komárom-Esztergom
  - Density: 175/km^{2} (450/sq mi)
- Website: Official website

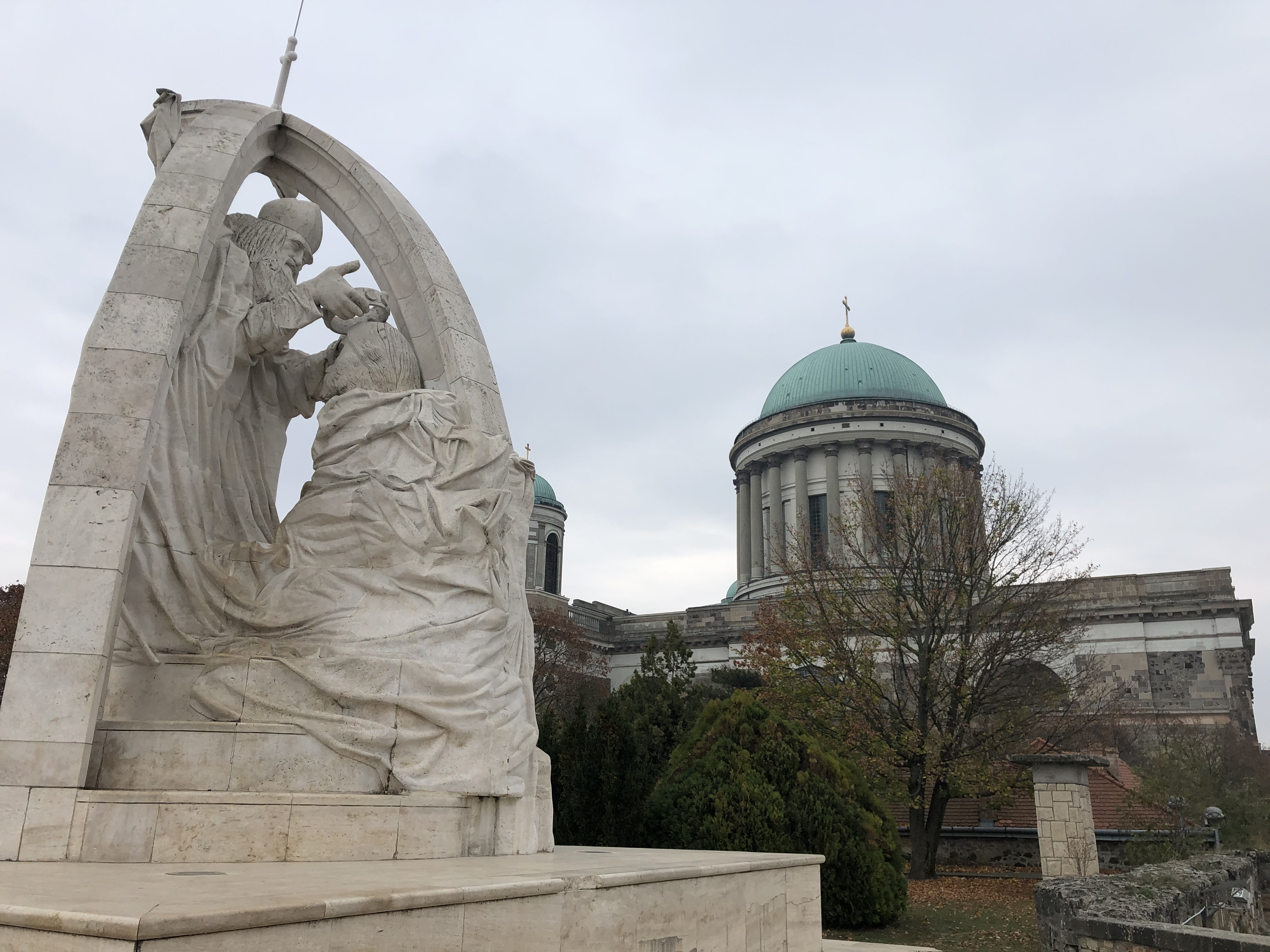
Statue of King Saint Stephen

Esztergom (Hungarian: Esztergomi járás) is a district in north-eastern part of Komárom-Esztergom County. Esztergom is also the town where the district seat is found. The district is located in the Central Transdanubia statistical region.

== Geography ==
Esztergom District borders with the Slovak Nitra Region to the north, Szob District and Szentendre District (Pest County) to the east, Pilisvörösvár District (Pest County) to the southeast, Tatabánya District to the southwest, Tata District to the west. The number of the inhabited places in Esztergom District is 24.

== Municipalities ==
The district seat, Esztergom, is a city with county rights. The district has four towns (bolded), one large village (in italics) and 18 villages. (ordered alphabetically, as of 1 January 2013)

- Annavölgy (931)
- Bajna (1,937)
- Bajót (1,607)
- Csolnok (3,166)
- Dág (948)
- Dömös (1,144)
- **Dorog** (11,905)
- Epöl (647)
- **Esztergom** (28,550) – district seat
- Kesztölc (2,606)
- **Lábatlan** (4,968)
- Leányvár (1,744)
- Máriahalom (643)
- Mogyorósbánya (853)
- Nagysáp (1,531)
- **Nyergesújfalu** (7,550)
- Piliscsév (2,321)
- Pilismarót (1,991)
- Sárisáp (2,740)
- Süttő (2,061)
- **Tát** (5,327)
- Tokod (4,137)
- Tokodaltáró (2,922)
- Úny (673)

== Demographics ==
Religion in Esztergom District (2011 census)
1. Catholic Church (45.4%)
2. Greek Catholicism (0.40%)
3. Calvinism (6.40%)
4. Lutheranism (0.60%)
5. Other religions (1.50%)
6. Non-religious (15.4%)
7. Atheists (1.20%)
8. Undeclared (29.1%)

In 2011, it had a population of 93,784 and the population density was 175/km^{2}.

Year	District population	Change
2011	93,784	n/a

=== Ethnicity ===
Besides the Hungarian majority, the main minorities are the German (approx. 4,200), Slovak (2,250), Roma (1,600) and Romanian (300).

Total population (2011 census): 93,784

Ethnic groups (2011 census):

- Hungarians: 79,701 (89.61%)
- Germans: 4,177 (4.69%)
- Slovaks: 2,254 (2.53%)
- Gypsies: 1,601 (1.80%)
- Others and indefinable: 1,209 (1.36%)
- Did not declare their ethnic group: approx. 5,000

=== Religion ===
Religious adherence in the county according to 2011 census:

- Catholic – 42,934 (Roman Catholic – 42,524; Greek Catholic – 396);
- Reformed – 6,018;
- Evangelical – 555;
- other religions – 1,423;
- Non-religious – 14,400;
- Atheism – 1,127;
- Undeclared – 27,327.

== See also ==
- List of cities and towns in Hungary
