= Tatabánya District =

Coordinates: 47.5833°N 18.4000°E

Tatabánya District Tatabányai járás
- Districts of Hungary
- Coat of arms

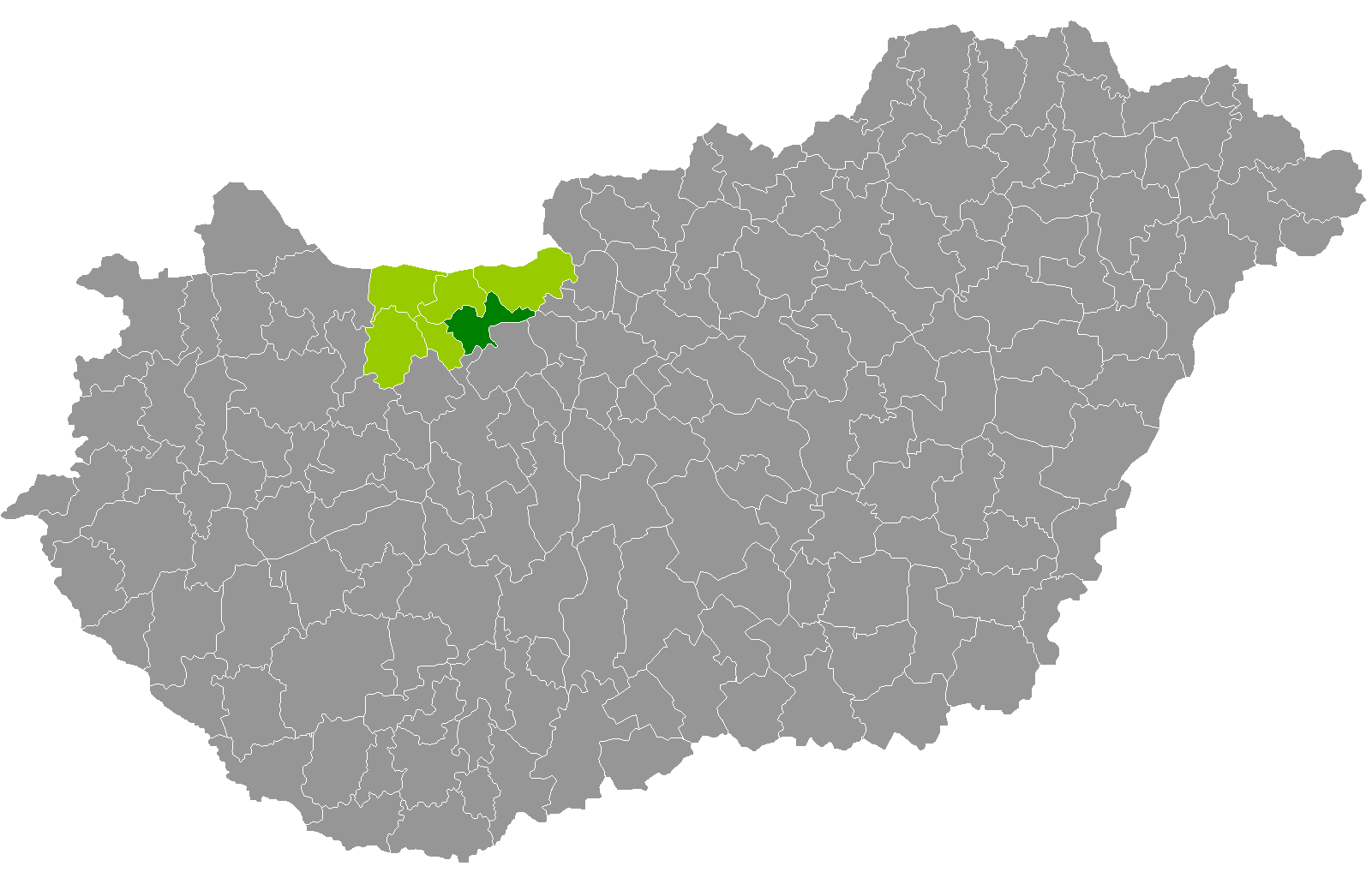
- Tatabánya District within Hungary and Komárom-Esztergom County.
- Country: Hungary
- County: Komárom-Esztergom
- District seat: Tatabánya

Area
  - Total: 331.65 km^{2} (128.05 sq mi)
  - Rank: 4th in Komárom-Esztergom

Population (2011 census)
  - Total: 85,691
  - Rank: 2nd in Komárom-Esztergom
  - Density: 258/km^{2} (670/sq mi)
- Website: Official website

Tatabánya (Hungarian: Tatabányai járás; German: Kreis Totiserkolonie) is a district in south-eastern part of Komárom-Esztergom County. Tatabánya is also the name of the town where the district seat is found. The district is located in the Central Transdanubia Statistical Region.

== Geography ==
Tatabánya District borders with Tata District and Esztergom District to the north, Budakeszi District (Pest County) to the east, Bicske District (Fejér County) to the east and south, Oroszlány District to the west. The number of the inhabited places in Tatabánya District is 10.

== Municipalities ==
The district has 1 urban county and 9 villages. (ordered by population, as of 1 January 2013)

- Gyermely (1,436)
- Héreg (1,032)
- Környe (4,418)
- Szárliget (2,286)
- Szomor (1,067)
- Tarján (2,560)
- **Tatabánya** (67,406) – district and county seat
- Várgesztes (548)
- Vértessomló (1,294)
- Vértesszőlős (3,007)

The bolded municipality is the city.

== Demographics ==
Religion in Tatabánya District (2011 census)
1. Catholic Church (28.9%)
2. Greek Catholicism (0.40%)
3. Calvinism (6.50%)
4. Lutheranism (1.00%)
5. Other religions (1.40%)
6. Non-religious (29.7%)
7. Atheists (1.90%)
8. Undeclared (30.2%)

In 2011, it had a population of 85,691 and the population density was 131/km².

Year	County population	Change
2011	85,691	n/a

=== Ethnicity ===
Besides the Hungarian majority, the main minorities are the German (approx. 3,900), Roma (1,400), Slovak (450) and Romanian (250).

Total population (2011 census): 85,691
Ethnic groups (2011 census): Identified themselves: 78,453 persons:

- Hungarians: 71,561 (91.22%)
- Germans: 3,883 (4.95%)
- Gypsies: 1,323 (1.69%)
- Others and indefinable: 1,686 (2.15%)

Approx. 7,000 persons in Tatabánya District did not declare their ethnic group at the 2011 census.

=== Religion ===
Religious adherence in the county according to 2011 census:

- Catholic – 25,106 (Roman Catholic – 24,726; Greek Catholic – 375);
- Reformed – 5,560;
- Evangelical – 809;
- other religions – 1,230;
- Non-religious – 25,470;
- Atheism – 1,620;
- Undeclared – 25,896.

== See also ==
- List of cities and towns in Hungary
