= Oroszlány District =

Coordinates: 47.4833°N 18.3167°E

Oroszlány District Oroszlányi járás
- Districts of Hungary
- Coat of arms

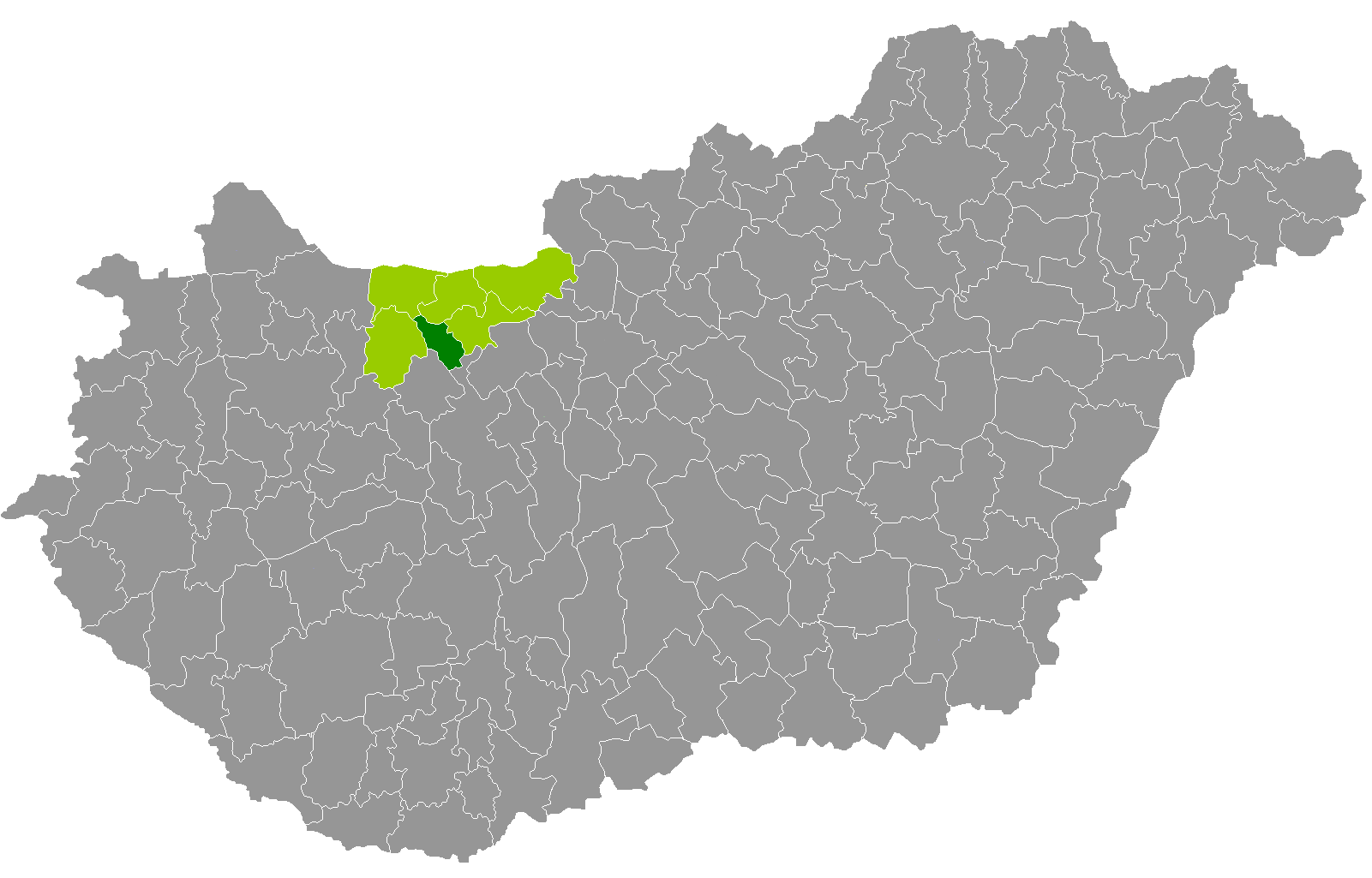
- Oroszlány District within Hungary and Komárom-Esztergom County.
- Country: Hungary
- County: Komárom-Esztergom
- District seat: Oroszlány

Area
  - Total: 199.39 km^{2} (76.98 sq mi)
  - Rank: 6th in Komárom-Esztergom

Population (2011 census)
  - Total: 26,163
  - Rank: 5th in Komárom-Esztergom
  - Density: 131/km^{2} (340/sq mi)
- Website: Official website

Oroszlány (Hungarian: Oroszlányi járás) is a district in southern part of Komárom-Esztergom County. Oroszlány is also the name of the town where the district seat is found. The district is located in the Central Transdanubia Statistical Region.

== Geography ==
Oroszlány District borders with Komárom District and Tata District to the north, Tatabánya District to the east, Bicske District and Mór District (Fejér County) to the south, Kisbér District to the west. The number of the inhabited places in Oroszlány District is 6.

== Municipalities ==
The district has 1 town and 5 villages. (ordered by population, as of 1 January 2013)

- Bokod (2,046)
- Dad (1,008)
- Kecskéd (1,996)
- Kömlőd (1,111)
- **Oroszlány** (18,326) – district seat
- Szákszend (1,486)

The bolded municipality is the city.

== Demographics ==
Religion in Oroszlány District (2011 census)
1. Catholic Church (28.2%)
2. Greek Catholicism (0.60%)
3. Calvinism (8.70%)
4. Lutheranism (4.90%)
5. Other religions (1.50%)
6. Non-religious (26.3%)
7. Atheists (1.60%)
8. Undeclared (28.2%)

In 2011, it had a population of 26,163 and the population density was 131/km^{2}.

Year	County population	Change
2011	26,163	n/a

=== Ethnicity ===
Besides the Hungarian majority, the main minorities are the German (approx. 700), Roma and Slovak (200), Romanian (150).

Total population (2011 census): 26,163
Ethnic groups (2011 census): Identified themselves: 23,489 persons:

- Hungarians: 21,761 (92.64%)
- Germans: 708 (3.01%)
- Gypsies: 498 (2.12%)
- Others and indefinable: 522 (2.22%)

Approx. 2,500 persons in Oroszlány District did not declare their ethnic group at the 2011 census.

=== Religion ===
Religious adherence in the county according to 2011 census:

- Catholic – 7,525 (Roman Catholic – 7,375; Greek Catholic – 147);
- Reformed – 2,284;
- Evangelical – 1,277;
- other religions – 397;
- Non-religious – 6,879;
- Atheism – 418;
- Undeclared – 7,382.

== See also ==
- List of cities and towns in Hungary
