= Etyek =

Etyek Edeck
- Large village
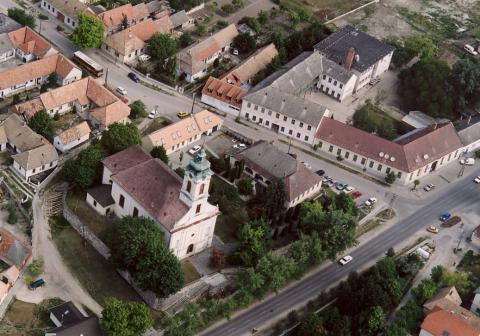
- Aerial view

- Flag Coat of arms

- Location of Etyek
- Coordinates: 47.44720°N 18.74960°E
- Country: Hungary
- County: Fejér
- District: Bicske

Area
  - Total: 53.27 km^{2} (20.57 sq mi)

Population (2004)
  - Total: 3,922
  - Density: 73.62/km^{2} (190.7/sq mi)
- Time zone: UTC+1 (CET)
  - Summer (DST): UTC+2 (CEST)
- Postal code: 2091
- Area code: (+36) 22
- Motorways: M1
- Distance from Budapest: 28.7 km (17.8 mi) East

Etyek (German: Edeck) is a large village in Fejér County, Hungary, approximately 30 km from Budapest. The area is surrounded by vineyards and is known for its wine-production. The Korda Studios film production facility has been established there.

== Events ==
- Föld napja (April second last Sundays)
- Etyeki Pincefesztivál (May)
- Etyeki Búcsú (first weekend in July)
- Etyeki Kezes-Lábos Gasztronómiai Fesztivál (September end)

== Gallery ==
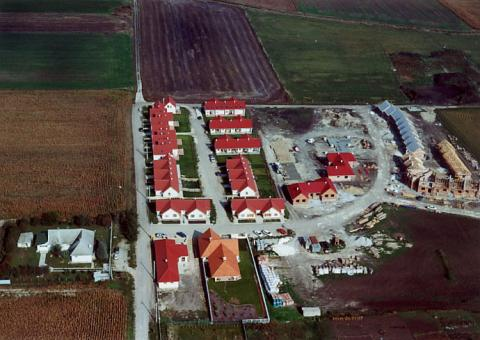

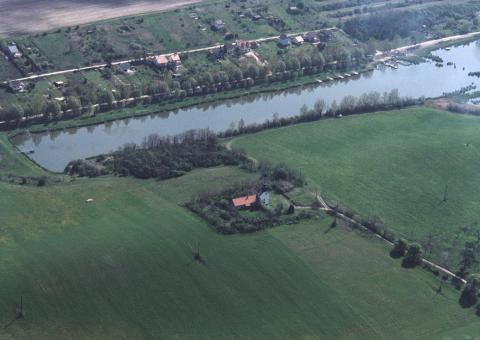

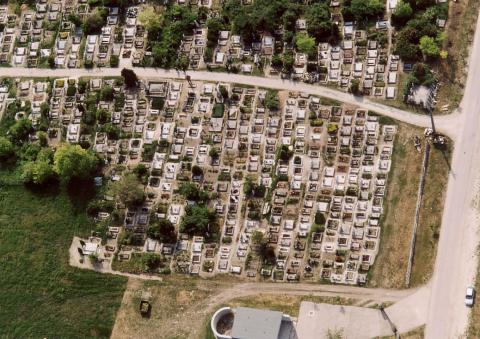
