= Zoltán Tessely =

Hungarian politician

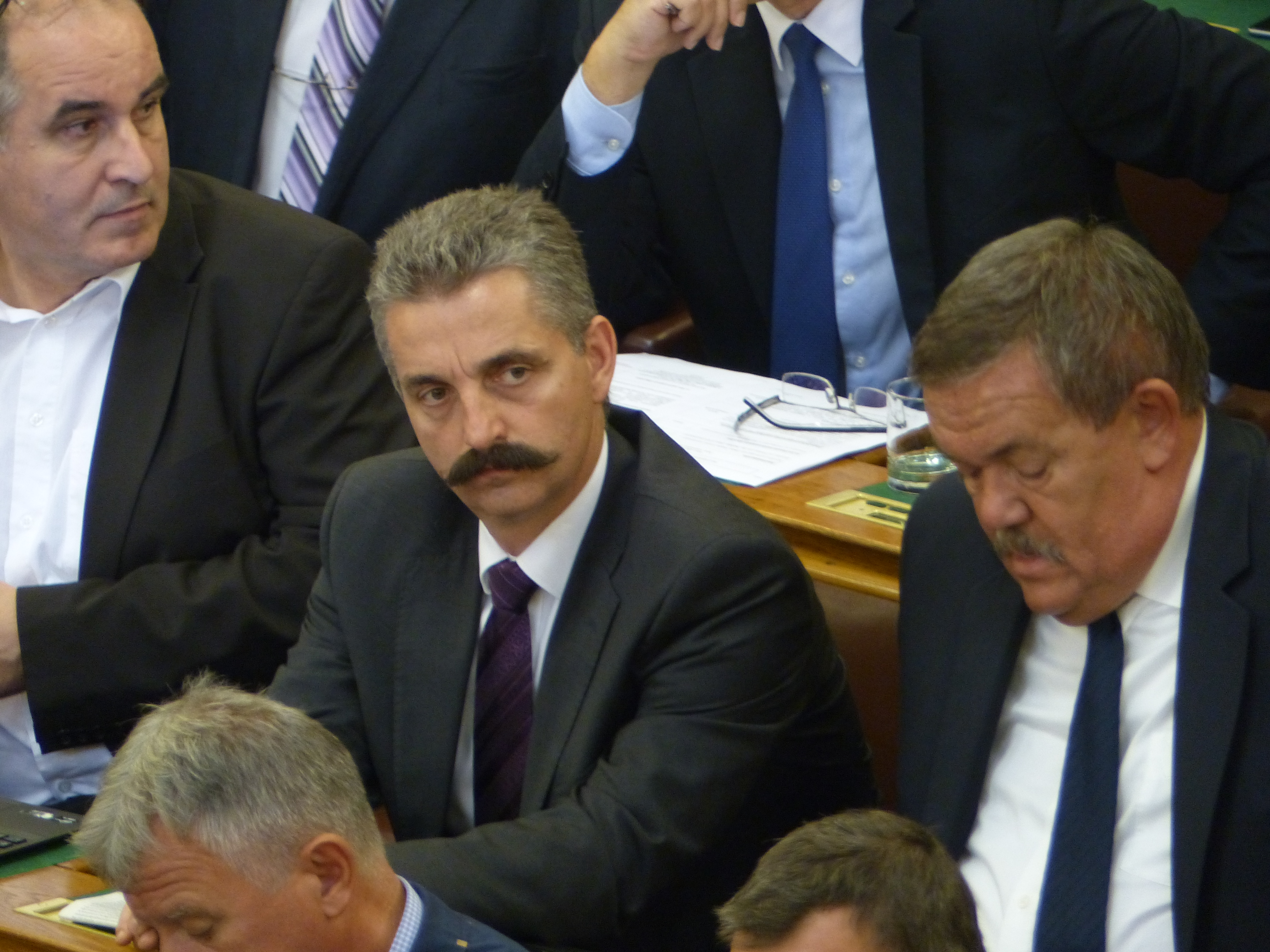

Member of the National Assembly
- Incumbent
- Assumed office 14 May 2010

Mayor of Bicske
- In office 28 September 2008 – 12 October 2014
- Preceded by: János Szántó
- Succeeded by: Károly Pálffy

Personal details
- Born: 1967 (age 58–59) Budapest, Hungary
- Party: Fidesz (since 2002)
- Spouse: Ildikó Czéghér
- Children: Anna Júlia; Borbála; Eszter
- Profession: teacher, politician

Zoltán Tessely (born 1967) is a Hungarian teacher and politician, member of the National Assembly (MP) for Bicske (Fejér County Constituency VII then III) since 2010. He became mayor of Bicske in September 2008, when he was elected during a by-election after the death of his predecessor János Szántó.

He joined Fidesz in 2002. He was elected MP for Bicske during the 2010 Hungarian parliamentary election. He won the local election in Bicske on 3 October 2010 as an incumbent office-holder. He is a member then Vice Chairman of the Committee on European Affairs since 14 May 2010.

Tessely was appointed Prime Ministerial Commissioner responsible for the regional development of St. Ladislaus and Vál Valleys on 1 January 2016.

== Personal life ==
He is married. His wife is Ildikó Czéghér. They have together three daughters, Anna Júlia, Borbála and Eszter.
