= Tát =

Tát Taath
- Town
- Flag Coat of arms

- Location of Komárom-Esztergom county in Hungary

- Location of Tát
- Coordinates: 47.74066°N 18.64471°E
- Country: Hungary
- County: Komárom-Esztergom
- District: Esztergom

Area
  - Total: 11.78 km^{2} (4.55 sq mi)

Population (2015)
  - Total: 5,280
  - Density: 448/km^{2} (1,160/sq mi)
- Time zone: UTC+1 (CET)
  - Summer (DST): UTC+2 (CEST)
- Postal code: 2534
- Area code: (+36) 33
- Website: tat.hu

Tát (German: Taath) is a town in Komárom-Esztergom County, Hungary.

== Climate ==
Tát's climate is classified as oceanic climate (Köppen Cfb). The annual average temperature is 10.9 °C (51.6 °F), the hottest month in July is 21.3 °C (70.3 °F), and the coldest month is 0.0 °C (32.0 °F) in January. The annual precipitation is 560.5 millimetres (22.07 in), of which July is the wettest with 65.0 millimetres (2.56 in), while April is the driest with only 30.7 millimetres (1.21 in). The extreme temperature throughout the year ranged from −20.2 °C (−4.4 °F) on December 21, 2009, to 40.1 °C (104.2 °F) on July 20, 2007.

Climate data for Tát, 1991−2020 normals
Month	Jan	Feb	Mar	Apr	May	Jun	Jul	Aug	Sep	Oct	Nov	Dec	Year
Record high °C (°F)	16.5 (61.7)	19.5 (67.1)	23.0 (73.4)	30.5 (86.9)	32.5 (90.5)	35.3 (95.5)	40.1 (104.2)	38.1 (100.6)	34.3 (93.7)	28.6 (83.5)	21.6 (70.9)	15.6 (60.1)	40.1 (104.2)
Mean daily maximum °C (°F)	3.0 (37.4)	5.8 (42.4)	11.4 (52.5)	17.7 (63.9)	22.2 (72.0)	25.8 (78.4)	27.9 (82.2)	27.8 (82.0)	22.3 (72.1)	16.2 (61.2)	9.5 (49.1)	3.6 (38.5)	16.1 (61.0)
Daily mean °C (°F)	0.0 (32.0)	1.7 (35.1)	6.1 (43.0)	11.6 (52.9)	16.1 (61.0)	19.6 (67.3)	21.3 (70.3)	20.9 (69.6)	16.2 (61.2)	11.0 (51.8)	5.9 (42.6)	0.9 (33.6)	10.9 (51.6)
Mean daily minimum °C (°F)	−2.9 (26.8)	−2.0 (28.4)	1.2 (34.2)	5.6 (42.1)	10.2 (50.4)	13.6 (56.5)	15.0 (59.0)	14.9 (58.8)	10.9 (51.6)	6.5 (43.7)	2.8 (37.0)	−1.5 (29.3)	6.2 (43.2)
Record low °C (°F)	−20.0 (−4.0)	−19.4 (−2.9)	−15.3 (4.5)	−6.9 (19.6)	−0.7 (30.7)	3.6 (38.5)	6.1 (43.0)	5.3 (41.5)	−0.2 (31.6)	−8.5 (16.7)	−13.0 (8.6)	−20.2 (−4.4)	−20.2 (−4.4)
Average precipitation mm (inches)	34.7 (1.37)	33.1 (1.30)	39.2 (1.54)	30.7 (1.21)	61.6 (2.43)	63.9 (2.52)	65.0 (2.56)	60.1 (2.37)	50.8 (2.00)	42.6 (1.68)	40.7 (1.60)	38.1 (1.50)	560.5 (22.07)
Average precipitation days (≥ 1.0 mm)	4.5	4.3	5.4	5.7	6.5	8.3	8.8	8.9	8.8	6.6	5.4	4.6	77.8
Average relative humidity (%)	82.2	76.5	70.3	64.1	68.5	69.2	67.5	69.5	73.6	78.1	83.0	84.0	73.9
Source: NOAA

== Twin cities ==
- Buseck, Germany
- Molln, Austria
- Obid, Slovakia
- Căpleni, Romania
