= Obid =

Village and municipality in Slovakia

Obid Ebed
- Municipality
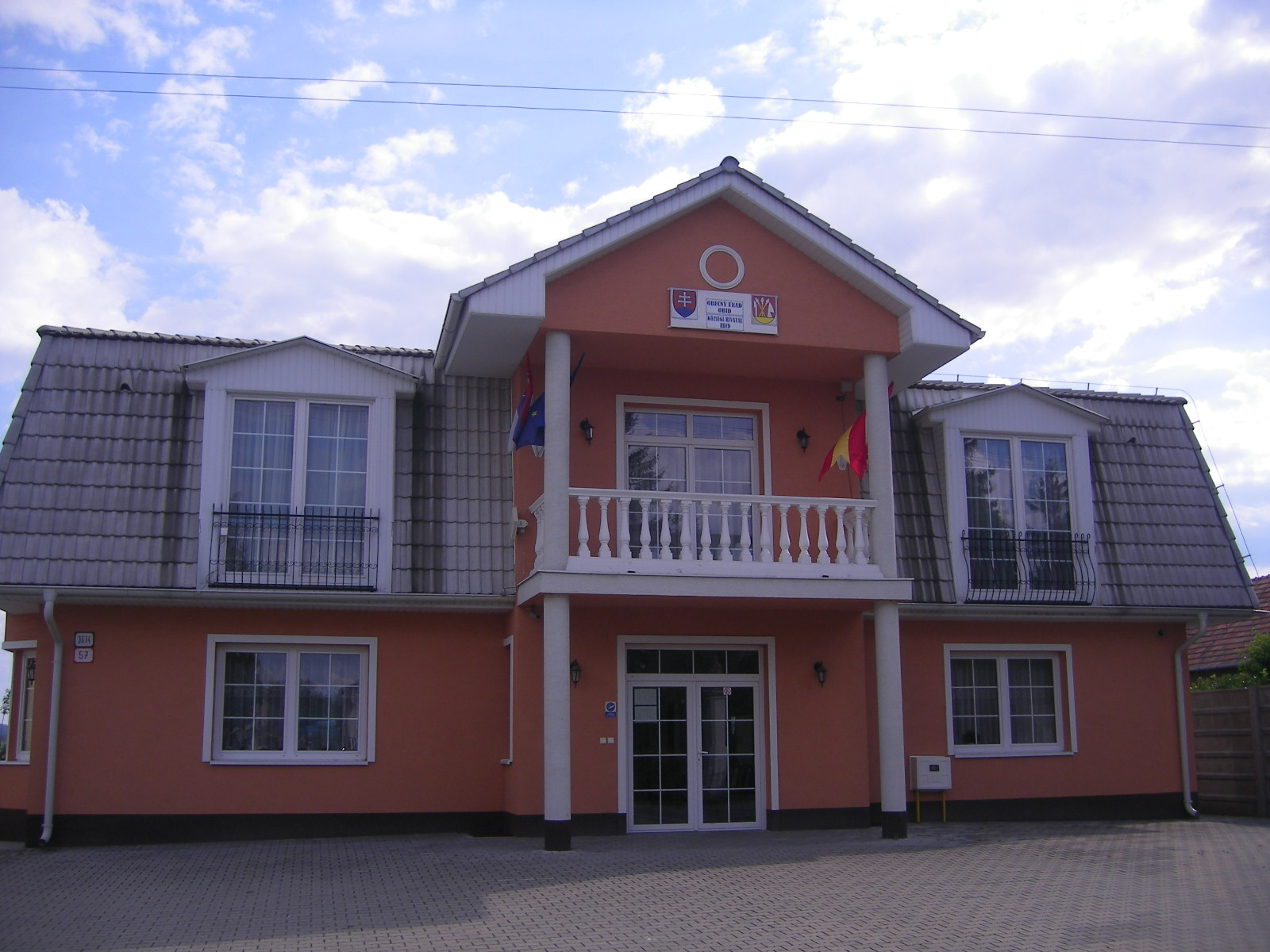

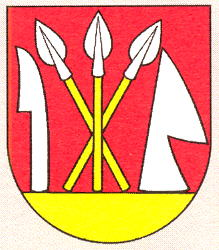
- Flag Coat of arms

- Location of Obid in the Nitra Region Location of Obid in Slovakia
- Coordinates: 47.78°N 18.65°E
- Country: Slovakia
- Region: Nitra Region
- District: Nové Zámky District
- First mentioned: 1237

Area
  - Total: 0.00 km^{2} (0 sq mi)
- Elevation: 118 m (387 ft)

Population (2025)
  - Total: 1,122
- Time zone: UTC+1 (CET)
  - Summer (DST): UTC+2 (CEST)
- Postal code: 943 04
- Area code: +421 36
- Vehicle registration plate (until 2022): NZ
- Website: www.obid.sk

Obid (Hungarian: Ebed) is a village and municipality in the Nové Zámky District in the Nitra Region of south-west Slovakia.

== History ==
In historical records the village was first mentioned in 1237.

== Geography ==
The municipality lies at an altitude of 118 metres (387 ft) and covers an area of 0.00 km^{2} (0 sq mi) (2025).

== Population ==
Population statistic (10 years)
Year	1995	2005	2015	2025
Count	0	1146	1173	1122
Difference		–	+2.35%	−4.34%

Population statistic
Year	2024	2025
Count	1143	1122
Difference		−1.83%

It has a population of 1122 people (31 December 2025).

=== Ethnicity ===
Census 2021 (1+ %)
Ethnicity	Number	Fraction
Hungarian	852	74.67%
Slovak	223	19.54%
Not found out	128	11.21%
Total	1141	

In year 2021 was 1141 people by ethnicity 852 as Hungarian, 223 as Slovak, 128 as Not found out, 8 as Czech, 5 as Romani, 1 as Rusyn, 1 as Russian, 1 as Polish, 1 as Moravian, 1 as Bulgarian and 1 as English.

Note on population: The difference values of population numbers in the table "Population statistic" and in the sections "Ethnicity" & "Religion" is caused by the use of various statistical methods.

=== Religion ===
Census 2021 (1+ %)
Religion	Number	Fraction
Roman Catholic Church	781	68.45%
None	186	16.3%
Not found out	114	9.99%
Calvinist Church	17	1.49%
Christian Congregations in Slovakia	16	1.4%
Total	1141	

In year 2021 was 1141 people by religion 781 from Roman Catholic Church, 186 from None, 114 from Not found out, 17 from Calvinist Church, 16 from Christian Congregations in Slovakia, 11 from Evangelical Church, 6 from Jehovah's Witnesses, 5 from Greek Catholic Church, 4 from Other and not ascertained christian church and 1 from Buddhism.

== Facilities ==
The village has a small public library and a football pitch.
