= Gánt =

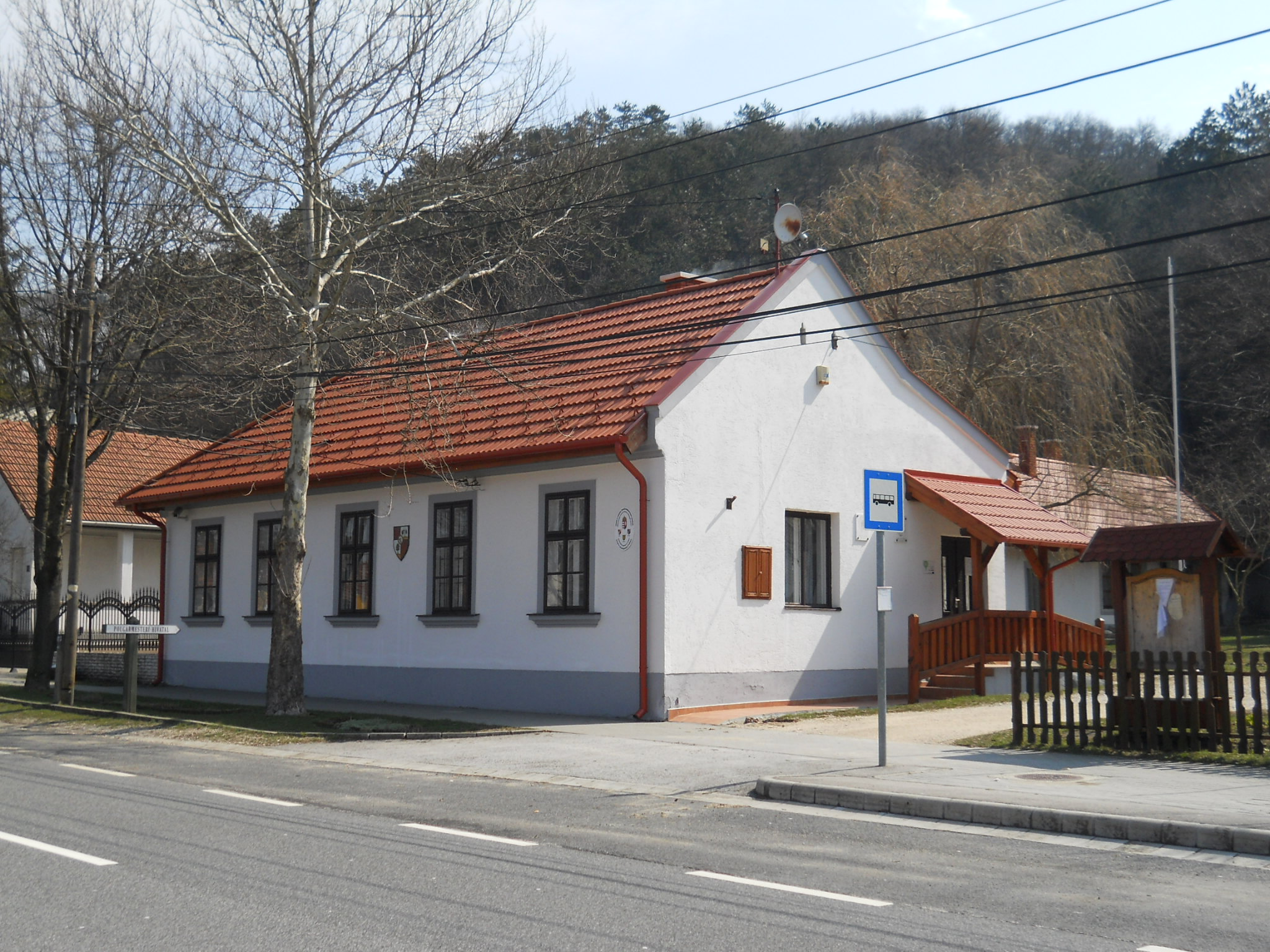
- Municipal office

- Coat of arms

- Location of Fejér county in Hungary

- Location of Gánt
- Coordinates: 47.38971°N 18.38773°E
- Country: Hungary
- County: Fejér

Area
  - Total: 58.15 km^{2} (22.45 sq mi)

Population (2025)
  - Total: 727
  - Density: 14.6/km^{2} (38/sq mi)
- Time zone: UTC+1 (CET)
  - Summer (DST): UTC+2 (CEST)
- Postal code: 8082
- Area code: 22
- Website: www.gant.hu

Gánt is a village in Fejér county, Hungary, with 727 inhabitants (as of 2025). The location is known for its history of bauxite mining.

The village has history reaching back to many centuries. After the Mongol and Ottoman occupation the area became uninhabited, thus Emperor Joseph II relocated peasants from Austria to work on the agrarian lands. The village kept the German tongue until the end of the Second World War, after which the native German speaking inhabitants were deported to Germany. This event was a great pain for the village and many people still commemorate the event and the victims are regular visitors of the village after the fall of Iron curtain. The village is also part of the blue hiking track in Hungary, so many tourists visit and pass through this small gem in the Vértes mountains.
