= Újbarok =

Újbarok Neudörfl
- Coat of arms

- Location of Fejér county in Hungary

- Location of Újbarok
- Coordinates: 47.47949°N 18.55801°E
- Country: Hungary
- County: Fejér

Area
  - Total: 1.49 km^{2} (0.58 sq mi)

Population (2004)
  - Total: 377
  - Density: 253.02/km^{2} (655.3/sq mi)
- Time zone: UTC+1 (CET)
  - Summer (DST): UTC+2 (CEST)
- Postal code: 2066
- Area code: 22

Újbarok (German: Neudörfl) is a village in Fejér county, Hungary.
