= Tabajd =

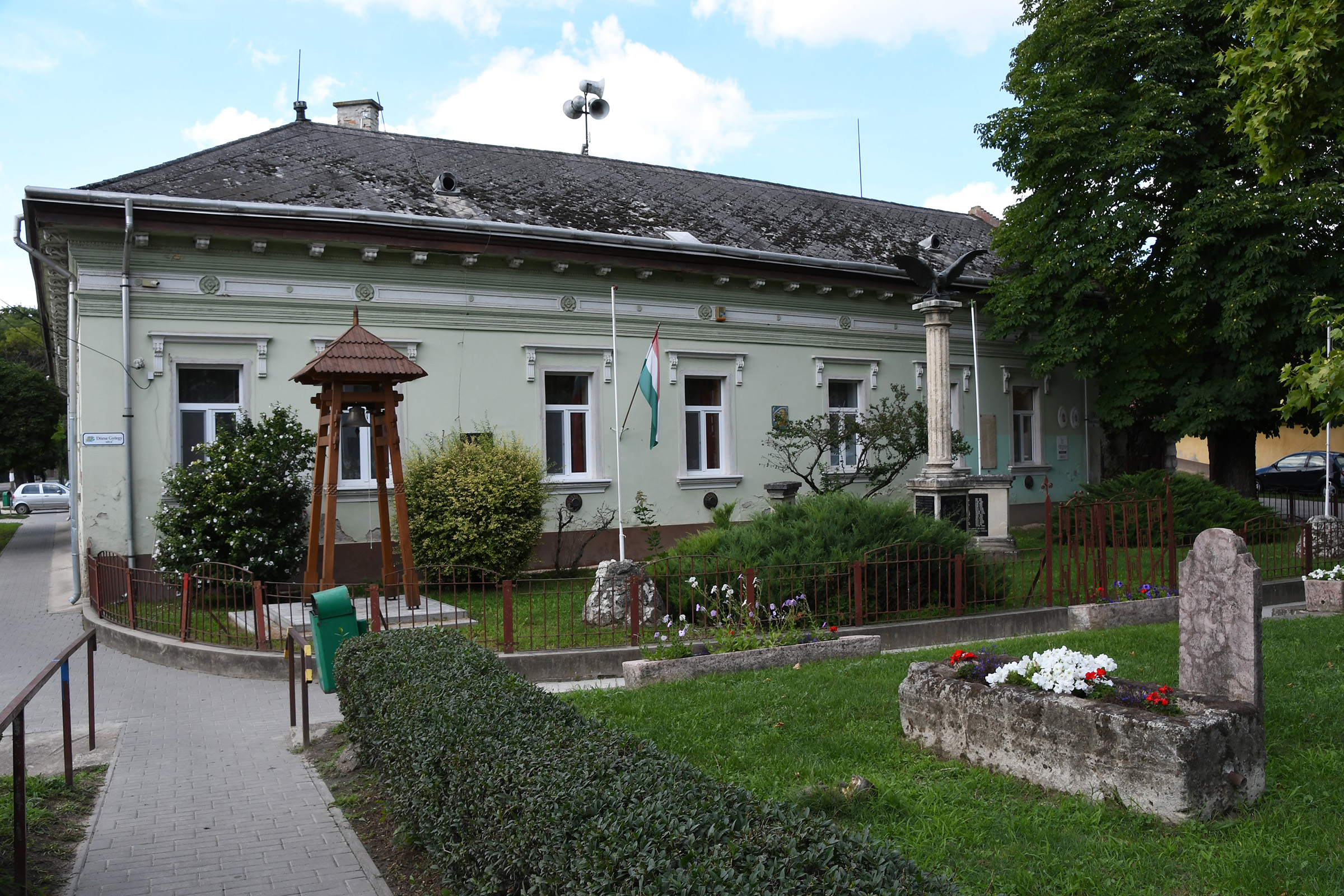
- Village hall

- Flag Coat of arms

- Location of Fejér county in Hungary

- Location of Tabajd
- Coordinates: 47.40431°N 18.63089°E
- Country: Hungary
- County: Fejér

Area
  - Total: 26.57 km^{2} (10.26 sq mi)

Population (2004)
  - Total: 972
  - Density: 36.58/km^{2} (94.7/sq mi)
- Time zone: UTC+1 (CET)
  - Summer (DST): UTC+2 (CEST)
- Postal code: 8088
- Area code: 22
- Website: www.tabajd.hu

Tabajd is a village in Fejér county, Hungary. Tabajd borders villages called Alcsútdoboz and Vál. Tabajd also has a park called Mezitlábas Park, which translates to Barefeet Park and this park lets you walk around on different types of ground barefoot like rock, stone, sand, etc.
