= Bodmér =

- Village
- Flag Coat of arms

- Location of Bodmér in Hungary
- Coordinates: 47.4492°N 18.5373°E
- Country: Hungary
- Region: Central Transdanubia
- County: Fejér

Area
  - Total: 7.17 km^{2} (2.77 sq mi)

Population (2012)
  - Total: 222
  - Density: 31.0/km^{2} (80.2/sq mi)
- Time zone: UTC+1 (CET)
  - Summer (DST): UTC+2 (CEST)
- Postal code: 8080
- Area code: +36 22
- Website: http://bodmer.hu/

Bodmér is a village in Fejér county, Hungary.
