= 1940–41 Nemzeti Bajnokság I =

Nemzeti Bajnokság I
- Season: 1940–41
- Champions: Ferencvárosi TC
- Relegated: BSzKRT SE; Tokodi Üveggyári SC; Törekvés SE; Szombathelyi Haladás VSE

Statistics of Nemzeti Bajnokság I in the 1940–41 season.

== Overview ==
It was contested by 14 teams, and Ferencvárosi TC won the championship.

== League standings ==
Pos	Team	Pld	W	D	L	GF	GA	GR	Pts
1	Ferencvárosi TC	26	21	3	2	113	47	2.404	45
2	Újpest FC	26	15	4	7	79	57	1.386	34
3	Szeged FC	26	14	4	8	56	47	1.191	32
4	Szolnoki MÁV FC	26	13	5	8	63	43	1.465	31
5	Csepeli WMFC	26	11	8	7	61	49	1.245	30
6	DiMÁVAG	26	11	5	10	61	57	1.070	27
7	Elektromos FC	26	13	1	12	53	50	1.060	27
8	Salgótarjáni BTC	26	9	6	11	44	64	0.688	24
9	Gamma FC	26	10	3	13	54	58	0.931	23
10	Kispest AC	26	9	4	13	56	68	0.824	22
11	BSZKRT	26	8	3	15	49	63	0.778	19
12	Tokodi Üveggyári SC	26	7	5	14	38	66	0.576	19
13	Törekvés SE	26	6	4	16	48	75	0.640	16
14	Szombathelyi Haladás	26	5	5	16	37	68	0.544	15

Source: rsssf.com

== Results ==
Home \ Away	BSZ	CSE	DIM	ELE	FTC	GAM	HAL	KIS	SAL	SZE	SZO	TOK	TÖR	ÚJP
BSZKRT		0–2	1–3	3–4	0–5	2–3	2–1	1–4	5–1	3–5	1–0	0–1	1–1	3–1
Csepel	3–3		4–3	1–1	2–3	0–1	5–0	2–0	1–1	1–3	1–4	3–3	6–1	2–1
DiMÁVAG	6–4	2–3		0–3	1–0	4–0	3–3	1–0	4–2	1–4	0–0	7–1	2–1	1–3
Elektromos	1–3	1–5	2–1		2–3	3–2	2–1	1–2	3–1	2–1	2–0	1–2	6–3	1–5
Ferencváros	4–4	6–2	6–3	2–0		2–2	4–1	4–3	3–2	4–0	4–0	4–1	6–3	5–2
Gamma	0–1	3–1	1–3	0–2	4–4		2–4	3–5	2–4	2–3	0–3	5–1	0–1	2–1
Haladás	2–0	1–3	1–1	1–0	3–5	3–3		2–5	0–0	0–3	0–3	2–1	1–2	3–4
Kispest	1–5	2–4	2–0	0–1	4–7	1–4	1–4		2–2	2–0	1–7	1–5	3–0	4–4
Salgótarján	1–0	1–1	2–1	3–1	1–9	2–3	4–0	1–6		2–3	0–5	1–1	2–0	0–7
Szeged FC	4–2	3–3	5–1	3–1	3–2	2–1	3–2	0–0	0–0		2–2	1–3	3–1	0–3
Szolnoki	3–0	2–2	3–6	2–1	2–4	1–4	4–0	1–0	2–3	3–0		3–0	3–1	1–1
Tokodi Üveggyár	1–2	0–1	0–1	0–3	0–7	0–1	0–0	3–3	4–3	1–0	1–6		4–1	3–3
Törekvés	3–1	1–1	2–2	6–5	2–5	1–3	4–2	2–3	1–2	3–4	1–1	3–1		3–5
Újpest	3–2	3–2	4–4	0–4	0–5	4–3	4–0	4–1	0–3	2–1	8–2	4–1	3–1	

Source: rsssf.com
Legend: Blue = home team win; Yellow = draw; Red = away team win.

== See also ==
- 1940–41 Nemzeti Bajnokság II
- 1940–41 Nemzeti Bajnokság III
