= Bicske =

- Town
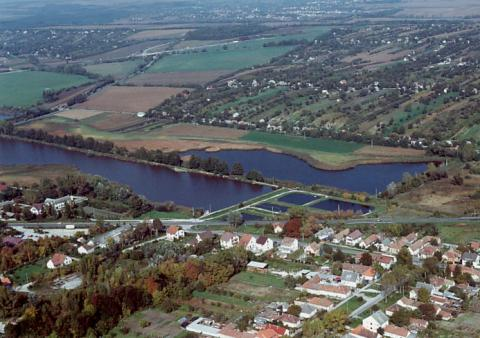

- Flag Coat of arms

- Location of Bicske
- Coordinates: 47.49074°N 18.63625°E
- Country: Hungary
- County: Fejér
- District: Bicske

Area
  - Total: 78.88 km^{2} (30.46 sq mi)

Population (2022 Census)
  - Total: 11,239
  - Density: 142.5/km^{2} (369.0/sq mi)
- Time zone: UTC+1 (CET)
  - Summer (DST): UTC+2 (CEST)
- Postal code: 2060
- Area code: (+36) 22
- Motorways: M1
- Distance from Budapest: 36.7 km (22.8 mi) East
- Website: bicske.hu

Bicske (Hungarian: [ˈbit͡ʃkɛ]; Latin: Lusomana or Lumanum) is a town in Fejér County, Hungary. It is around 35 km (22 mi) west of Budapest. Its administration has undergone many changes; it has been a settlement, a village, a market town, and a village constituting an administrative division.

== History ==
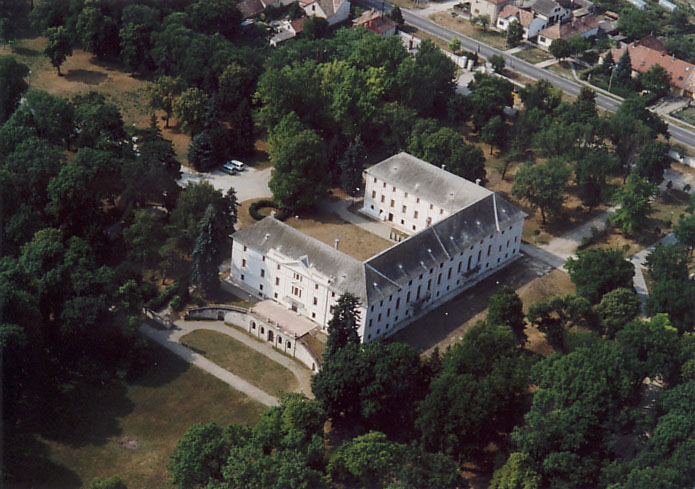
Aerial view of Batthyány Mansion, Bicske

The name of the Byckche family has been known since 1258 when some members got a large donation of land from the king. According to a document dating from 1306, Botond's sons János (John) and Péter were granted permission to levy tolls in the locality of Bicske.

From 1596 onward, Bicske belonged to the Ottoman Empire.

Count Ádám Batthyány bought the land in 1642. The Batthyány family built a castle in 1754–1755, and made it their residence. The Batthyány family also built an observatory and a little castle (Hegyi-kastély) for the astronomers. During the Batthyány era, the village, which had been destroyed by the Turks, became a prosperous town. From 1688 to 1877, it was the chief town of the district.

A Jewish community developed in Bicske during the 18th century; most of its members were associated with the Neolog or Reform Judaism movement. They built a synagogue and a school, which was open to both Christian and Jewish students. By the 19th century Bicske was a well-developed market town and cultural centre. From 1877 to 1946 it belonged to the district of Vál.

After World War I, an era known as the "White Terror," lasting from 1919 - 1921, saw the Jewish community of Bicske under attack by Christians, as homes were looted and citizens were murdered.

In 1940, during World War II, Jewish farms and shops were confiscated and nationalized and able-bodied Jewish men were sent to Ukraine to work in the mines. In May 1940, a ghetto was erected in Bicske and Jews from neighboring towns were brought there for confinement. In June 1940, the ghetto was liquidated and its entire Jewish population was sent to the Komárom ghetto and, that same month, to Auschwitz concentration camp for extermination. The town's synagogue was completely destroyed.

Bicske was captured on 24 December 1944 by Soviet troops of the 3rd Ukrainian Front in the course of the Budapest Offensive. On the night of 4 January 1945 the German Nazi 5th SS Panzer Regiment, under the command of Fritz Darges, advanced towards Bicske but was stopped by the 41st Guards Rifle Division of the Soviet 4th Guards Army. The Germans retreated, but destroyed more than thirty Soviet tanks during the battle.

In 1947 Bicske became independent.

There were 12,000 inhabitants in 1986.

=== Archaeological sites ===
Roman-era lime kilns were unearthed during expansion of the M1 Motorway in 2026. The excavation was commissioned by the National Archaeology Institute of the Hungarian National Museum under the direction of archaeologist Alexandra Kiss.

== Main sights ==
- Roman Catholic Church (18th century) with a Maulbertsch panel painting
- Batthyány Mansion, Bicske (built in 1754-1755)
- In the center of the town are excavated ruins of a temple with several tombs, dating from the 15th century
- Ruins of the Observatory and the astronomers' castle

== Sport ==
The association football club, Bicskei TC, is based in the town.

== Twin towns – sister cities ==
Bicske is twinned with:

- Altshausen, Germany
- Băile Tușnad, Romania
- Chop, Ukraine
- Reci, Romania
