= Pál Schmitt academic misconduct controversy =

Plagiarism scandal leading to the resignation of Hungary's president

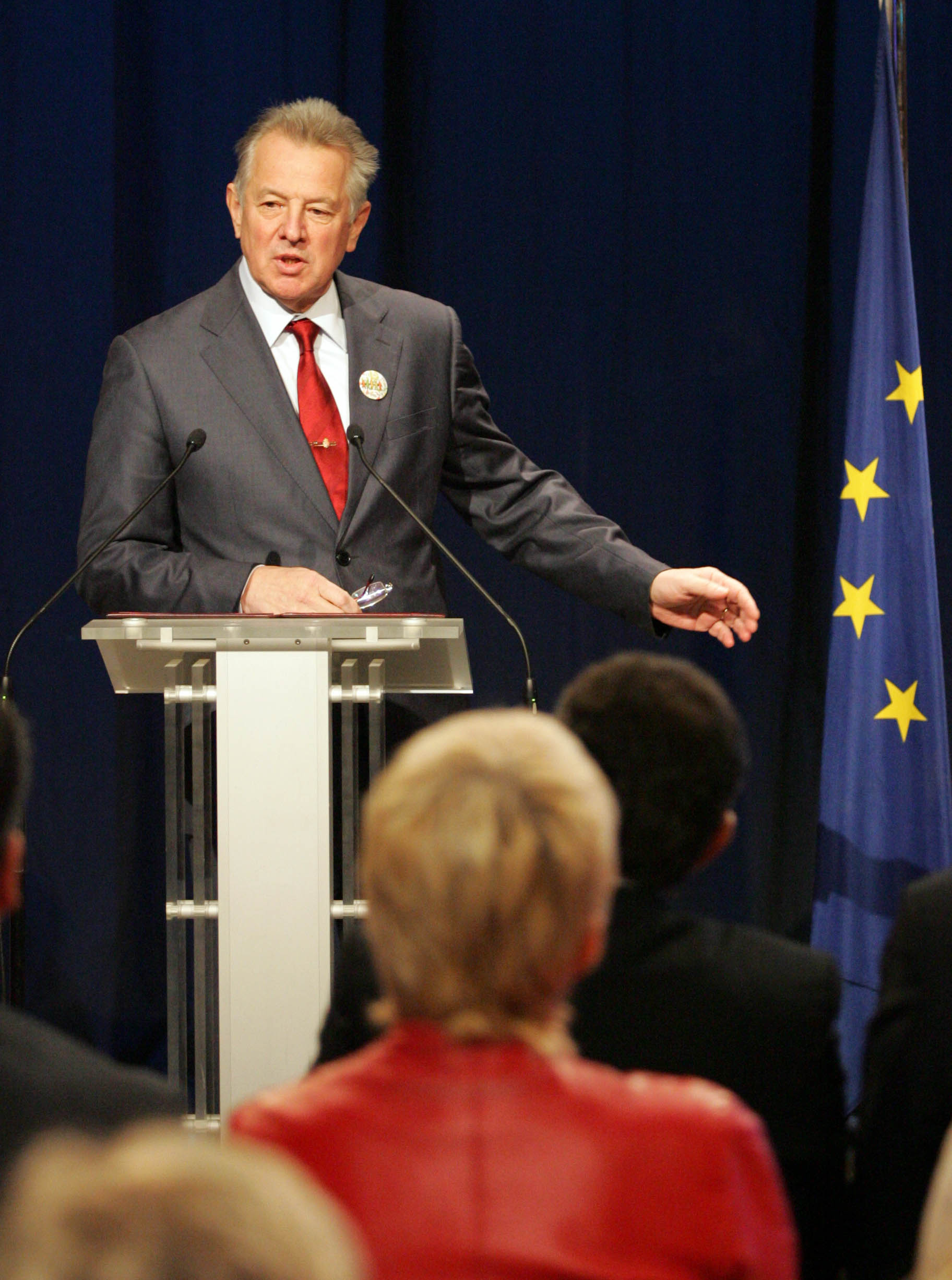
Pál Schmitt in 2011

The Pál Schmitt academic misconduct scandal refers to allegations of plagiarism concerning the 1992 doctoral thesis and the circumstances of the doctoral defence of the President of Hungary Pál Schmitt, which led to Schmitt's resignation from his presidential post. The scandal broke in January 2012, when Hungarian news organizations published a number of articles claiming that about 197 pages of Schmitt's 215-page thesis had been lifted from works by other, foreign scholars, without giving appropriate credit.

On 11 January 2012, Hungarian magazine Heti Világgazdaság published an article which claimed that material that amounts to around 180 of the 215 pages of Pál Schmitt's 1992 doctoral (dr. univ.) thesis, titled "Az újkori olimpiai játékok programjának elemzése" ("An analysis of the programme of the modern Olympics"), had been lifted from a 1987 manuscript by Bulgarian sports researcher Nikolay Georgiev, together with a page's worth of material from a work by Hristo Meranzov and Georgiev. On 19 January, news organizations found that an additional 17 pages had been copied from a paper by German sport sociologist Klaus Heinemann. The late Georgiev's daughter said she did not know of any cooperation between Schmitt and her father in the preparation of Georgiev's work. Heinemann denied any knowledge of Schmitt, and expressed his concerns about the plagiarism allegations.

Further concerns about a conflict of interest were raised when it was reported that multiple members of Schmitt's thesis committee had also been members of the Hungarian Olympic Academy and the Hungarian Olympic Committee, organizations both headed by Schmitt at the time his title was awarded.

After the initial report, Schmitt denied the allegations, saying that no plagiarism took place, as he had listed Georgiev's work in the list of works cited. The President made no further comments, including any comments about the allegation regarding the Heinemann text, until a radio interview in which he shrugged off the claim, saying that it was natural for all such works to include a certain amount of common "core material". A number of scholars started a petition asking for a fair and transparent investigation of the allegations. Although they have PhD degrees, Hungarian news agency Magyar Távirati Iroda (MTI) referred to them as doctoral students.

After a formal investigation, a five-member fact finding committee at Semmelweis University delivered a report on 27 March. The University Council advised the University Senate to withdraw Schmitt's doctorate title. The University Senate withdrew Schmitt's title on 29 March. On 2 April, Schmitt announced to the Hungarian Parliament that he would resign as president.

== Background ==
=== Pál Schmitt ===
Schmitt was a successful fencer in his youth, winning two gold medals at the Summer Olympic Games. Later, he served as an ambassador during the 1990s, and he was a Member of the European Parliament with the Fidesz party from 2004 to 2010. After briefly serving as Speaker of the National Assembly of Hungary in 2010, Schmitt was elected as President of Hungary in a 263 to 59 vote in the Parliament of Hungary; he was sworn in as president on 6 August 2010.

From 1983 to 1988 Schmitt was the general secretary of the Hungarian Olympic Committee, and in 1981–1990 he was undersecretary for sport. In 1990, after the end of Communism in Hungary, he became president of the Hungarian Olympic Committee, a post he held until 2010.

=== Faculty of Sport Sciences, Semmelweis University ===
Founded in 1769, Semmelweis University is the oldest medical school in Hungary, located in Budapest. Becoming an independent medical school after the Second World War it developed into a university teaching medicine, dentistry, pharmacy, health sciences, health management, and following the merger with the University of Physical Education, physical education and sport sciences. The university is named after Ignác Semmelweis.

Today's Faculty of Physical Education and Sport Sciences at the Semmelweis University was founded in 1925 as a separate institution, Hungarian Royal Physical Education College. Between 1945 and 1989 it operated under the name of Hungarian College of Physical Education, and in 1989 it became the Hungarian University of Physical Education. In 2000 the previously independent university became part of the Semmelweis University as the Faculty of Sport Sciences.

=== Dr. Univ. versus PhD ===
Until 1993 the only doctoral title Hungarian universities could award was the doctor universitatis, or dr. univ., title. It was not considered to be an academic degree. The so-called candidate's degree (C.Sc.) was the first post-graduate scientific degree, and it was issued by the Committee of Scientific Qualifications of the Hungarian Academy of Sciences. The requirements for the univ. dr. title were generally below the Doctor of Philosophy (PhD) requirements, while those of the candidate's degree were above the PhD level. In 1993, the PhD degree was introduced in Hungary, and the universities had the jurisdiction to convert dr. univ. degrees to PhD doctorates on a case-by-case basis, if they met the necessary requirements. (The conversion of the candidate's titles had been automatic, on request.) Schmitt's degree was not converted, although his CV on the website of the EU Parliament states that he has a PhD. In 2012, his CV on the IOC website also listed his title as "doctor of philosophy."

== Allegations of misconduct ==
=== Plagiarism ===
The known extent of plagiarism in Pál Schmitt's dissertation. Identified sources: ██ Georgiev (1987) ██ Heinemann (1991) ██ Le mouvement olympique / The Olympic Movement (1990) ██ Olympic Charter (1991) ██ Defrantz (1991) The location of the approximately two pages worth of material drawn from Meranzov & Georgiev (1985) in the text has not yet been disclosed.

On 11 January 2012, Heti Világgazdaság published an article claiming that most of Schmitt's 1992 thesis, 180 of the 215 pages, was almost a word-for-word translation of parts of Bulgarian sport scholar and diplomat Nikolay Georgiev's 465-page 1987 French-language manuscript Analyse du programme olympique (des Jeux d’Olympiade), and it also contained a page worth of material from the 1985 work Analysis of the Olympic Programme by Hristo Meranzov and Nikolay Georgiev. The site also published a 12-page PDF document containing excerpts from both Georgiev's manuscript and Schmitt's dissertation for comparison. Heti Világgazdaság remarked that Schmitt's dissertation did not contain in-body citations, only a bibliography listing 21 pieces of literature. In this bibliography the place of publication of Georgiev's manuscript was erroneously given as Bulgaria, instead of Lausanne, Switzerland, and the title of the work was given in Hungarian, although Georgiev's work has not been published in Hungary. The piece also reported that the dissertation contains a multitude of spelling mistakes, some mistranslations and erroneous statements that were present in Georgiev's manuscript. Though the reviewers of the dissertation, István Kertész and Ferenc Takács, had multiple issues regarding the dissertation, both of them gave the work summa cum laude, the highest rating that can be awarded.

On 18 January Schmitt gave a radio interview in which he stated that around 30–35 pages in his thesis was material original to him and contained conclusions drawn from the "core material". (See below.) In response, Heti Világgazdaság reported that, in contrast to what Schmitt stated in the radio interview, the Conclusions section of his thesis (a single page) is also mostly part of the material that had been lifted from Georgiev's work.

On 19 January, the news portal Index reported that parts of the remaining 35 pages of Schmitt's dissertation were translated and copied from German sport sociologist Klaus Heinemann's 1991 work The Economics of Sport: The Institution of Modern Sport as an Area of Economic Competition. A reference to this work was found in Schmitt's Bibliography, but again, the title was translated into Hungarian, where no such translation existed. Later that day, Heti Világgazdaság—in possession of the text of Schmitt's dissertation—confirmed that a direct translation of eight out of the nine pages of Heinemann's work amounts to further 17 pages of Schmitt's dissertation. Heti Világgazdaság published another five-page PDF document comparing Heinemann's work and Schmitt's dissertation.

On 6 March Heti Világgazdaság announced that they have identified further sources. According to Heti Világgazdaság the first few pages of Schmitt's dissertation contain text from a 1990 educational brochure (The Olympic Movement / Le Mouvement Olympique) published by the International Olympic Committee. Though the Bibliography section of the dissertation contains a reference to this work, it is given in Hungarian and with incorrectly specified bibliographic information. Text drawn from the Olympic Charter (1992) has also been found in Schmitt's work. Heti Világgazdaság also reported that the seven tables and two charts that make up the appendix of Schmitt's dissertation have also been taken from Georgiev's 1987 manuscript Analyse du programme olympique, without proper attribution of authorship.

The original Heti Világgazdaság research that broke the controversy was done by an anonymous freelancer, and regular commenter on the Heti Világgazdaság website, over a stretch of nine months, with interruptions. The origins of the remaining circa 18 pages are not known, but the staff of Heti Világgazdaság were researching whether they are Schmitt's own work or not.

Further plagiarized sources were identified by readers of the website Index on 29 March. Among others, Schmitt included word-by-word translations from a work by IOC member Anita DeFrantz without referencing it at all. (DeFrantz happens to be the one who recommended Schmitt's daughter Petra for a University of Southern California tennis scholarship during the Salt Lake City Olympic bid. Petra Schmitt went on to make All-American of the Intercollegiate Tennis Association.)

=== Thesis committee conflicts of interest ===
Conflict of interest concerns regarding the doctoral thesis committee have been raised.

Schmitt defended his 1992 thesis before a committee headed by József Tihanyi. The other four members were Csaba Istvánfi, the late Mihály Nyerges and the two reviewers, István Kertész and Ferenc Takács.

In an article on 18 January Népszabadság cited the 37th section of the 1985 Doctoral Regulations of the Hungarian College of Physical Education, which stated that a person from whom an objective assessment of the candidate's work cannot be expected may not participate in review of the doctoral dissertation. In the opinion of Népszabadság, Kertész and Takács both had conflicting interests, since they were members of the Council of the Hungarian Olympic Academy (MOA, an organization founded by the Hungarian Olympic Committee), headed by Schmitt.

On 19 January the news portal Origo stated that Takács had been a member of the MOA since 1985, and that Kertész became a member in 1992. In 1992 both Istvánfi and Nyerges were members of the Hungarian Olympic Committee (MOB), and Tihanyi joined in 1994. Takács is also a member. Schmitt was the president of the MOA between 1985 and 1990, and general secretary of the MOB between 1990 and 2010. Tihanyi told Origo that "with hindsight it is unfortunate" that Schmitt had to defend his dissertation before committee members who were also members of the MOB, but he added that the university regulations at that time only regulated conflicts of interest that were limited to the university.

== Reactions ==
=== Office of the President ===
Four hours after the publication of the hvg.hu article that raised the issue of plagiarism the Office of the President issued the following statement:

President Pál Schmitt, in 1992, prepared a dissertation at the College of Physical Education entitled "The Analysis of the Program of Modern Era Olympic Games" for the title doctor. univ. The work filled a niche, and was reviewed by professors of history who gave the dissertation a summa cum laude grade. It was their competency to judge whether the dissertation was adequate regarding content and format.

- The grade awarded to the dissertation speaks for itself!
- Pál Schmitt has been a member of the International Olympic Committee since 1983, and he personally knew the noted sports historian Nikolay Georgijev, whom he cited as a source.
- During their research, they have cooperated throughout the discussion of several sub-topics. The most important basic sources of both works were the protocols of the IOC and the protocols of the IOC Executive Board, and the closing documents of the Olympics in the study.
- For the reasons stated above the Office of the President rejects the allegations of plagiarism published in the article.

=== Malina Georgieva ===
In an interview with Heti Világgazdaság, Malina Georgieva, daughter of the late Nikolay Georgiev, indicated that her father and Schmitt both worked at IOC in Lausanne and knew each other. Nonetheless, she found it implausible that the two cooperated on the research, and called the allegation of Georgiev omitting credit preposterous. She also denied any intention to litigate, noting that because her father's research was funded by the IOC, the IOC holds the copyright over the original document.

=== Pál Schmitt ===
Schmitt was attending the Youth Olympic Games in Austria at the time Heti Világgazdaság published the article on the alleged plagiarism. His first official appearance was six days later on 16 January at the residence of the President, Sándor Palace, where he appointed Norbert Csizmadia as state secretary of the Ministry for National Economy. The press was asked by a staff member of the Office of the President "not to disrupt the event by asking questions".

Schmitt was scheduled to give a talk on 19 January at the Károly Eszterházy College in Eger. On 17 January students of the college received a message via the internal university website stating that "[t]he Office of the President decided, considering the obligations of the students, that Dr Pál Schmitt, President of the Republic, is not going to disrupt the examination period (neither the exams nor the preparation for the exams) with his presentation".

On 18 January Schmitt gave a half-hour radio interview on MR1, during which he was asked about the allegations. Regarding the lack of in-body citations he stated that the regulations at that time allowed for the listing the sources only as a Bibliography section at the end of the dissertation. He said that in his opinion, because he listed Georgiev's work in this Bibliography the term "plagiarism" has no relevance in this case.

He further stated that the 180 pages he used are basic data, and as such, they are not in the property of anyone. He also added that there are ns 30 to 35 pages in the dissertation that contain conclusions drawn by himself from the previously mentioned "basic material".

Regarding the outcome of the controversy he said: "I am looking forward to the resolution of this issue, and I sincerely hope that I can clear myself of the accusation behind which I cannot suspect anything more than mere malice."

On 19 January it was reported that, in contrast to Schmitt's statements in the radio interview, 18 of the remaining 35 pages were not original to him; since that point there have been no further comments from the President.

=== Hungarian Government ===
On 13 January the news portal Index asked Péter Szijjártó, spokesman for Prime Minister of Hungary Viktor Orbán to comment on the issue; he wrote that "we do not wish to address such an undeserving tabloid-hoax". In a television interview for TV2 on 16 January, when asked what the official opinion of the Hungarian Government was responding to the allegations, Szijjártó reiterated: "to tell you honestly, I find this whole thing undeserving, that they are trying to get the President of the Republic involved in such a tabloid-hoax". He further added that he finds the timing of the accusations suspicious: "this tabloid-hoax surfaced one day after the President of the Republic stood up firmly on the side of Hungary, against the attacks, at a reception for the leaders of the diplomatic corps."

In a television interview for ATV on 13 January András Giró-Szász, spokesman for the Hungarian Government was asked about the stance of the Government on the issue. He said: "Look, my original profession and my studies have led me to the field of history at one time, and there I have learned, and this I can support with examples from history, that the head of the state is essentially the first person of the state. And the members of the Government are the servants of the state. Its first servants. [...] It follows from this that the only task of any Government in power in this regard is to unconditionally support the President of the Republic in office." The spokesman was then asked whether, in the opinion of the Government, Schmitt should resign if the allegations would turn out to be valid. He replied that there is no possibility of intervention, no obligation and no such intention from the side of the Government.

In the autumn of 2011 the State Secretariat for Education of the Ministry of National Resources published an announcement in which the state secretary for education, Rózsa Hoffmann reminded all university and college students that "submitting a thesis written by someone else as one's own work constitutes a criminal offence". She also wrote that if the Ministry of National Resources becomes aware of a case of thesis-related abuse, it is going to file a complaint with the National Police Headquarters. Hoffmann stressed that it is not permissible to allow students to obtain diplomas through fraud. In light of this announcement Heti Világgazdaság asked the Secretariat for Education on 13 January to comment on the issue of Schmitt's alleged plagiarism; Hoffmann's Secretariat told the journalists that they should turn to the Office of the President instead.

=== Klaus Heinemann ===
On 19 January Index reported that parts of Schmitt's dissertation came from Klaus Heinemann's The Economics of Sport: the Institution of Modern Sport as an Area of Economic Competition. hvg.hu soon confirmed this finding, stating that eight pages out of Heinemann's nine-page long work correspond to about 17 pages in Schmitt's dissertation. On 23 January Heinemann told Index.hu that he is seriously concerned by the case, partially because of professional ethical reasons, especially since an important politician is involved. He added: "My scientific recognition is significantly linked to this work of mine that contains important findings, therefore it is shocking to hear that others have used it to further their academic recognition undeservingly." Heinemann also responded to earlier reports that Semmelweis University has difficulties setting up a committee of inquiry because experts qualified to be members are turning down requests to join. He wrote: "It reflects badly on my Hungarian colleagues, if, because of political opportunism, they are reluctant to punish those who violate basic and essential ethical norms of science."

=== Hungarian scientific community ===
==== Petition to investigate ====
On 16 January, seven scholars, mainly historians, started a petition asking the rector of the Semmelweis University, the Minister of National Resources, and the Hungarian Academy of Sciences for a fair, public and transparent investigation of the allegations. The authors of the petition expressed their dissatisfaction with the reaction of the dean of the Faculty of Sport Sciences at Semmelweis University who stated that the procedure of the issuance of the dr. univ. title was according to regulations, the reviews were unambiguous, therefore did not call for a formal investigation.

[this issue cannot remain unresolved], because it beclouds every scientific degree, every academic qualification awarded by a Hungarian university or academic institution. These are our scientific degrees. If, in light of the material presented by hvg.hu, we send the message to the next generation of researchers and the world-wide scientific community that we in the Hungarian scientific community do not deal with allegations so serious and supported by such grievous evidence, then we discredit the institutions of the Hungarian scientific community. The scientific degrees and qualifications that we have obtained are of dubious value from that point, since from the outside it is apparent: they are reluctant to do what is self-evident to do elsewhere. This can also have the consequence that in the future, Hungarian researchers will not be welcomed partners in the world, and the works of Hungarian authors will be received with suspicion.

==== Batthyány Society of Professors ====
Physicist Rezső Lovas, a member of the MTA and the president of the Batthyány Society of Professors, a conservative association of university lecturers, said on 17 January: "First of all, one should not jump to hasty conclusions. I have not seen Pál Schmitt's dissertation, nor the article he allegedly drew from. There are many ways of drawing from [sources], and there is a continuous transition between citation and explicit plagiarism". He also added that in his opinion it is unlikely that the allegations can be proven valid. He further asked whether there was any evidence presented, stating that the burden of proof is on those accusing Schmitt.

==== Hungarian Academy of Sciences ====
On 18 January, in response to the petition, József Pálinkás, president of the Hungarian Academy of Sciences wrote that since Schmitt does not hold a scientific degree (PhD) and is not a member of the public body of the Hungarian Academy of Sciences, the academy has no jurisdiction to conduct an investigation into the allegations of plagiarism.

== Formal investigation ==
On 11 January György Bazsa, president of the Hungarian Accreditation committee stated that an investigation needs to be conducted by the university that issued the title. Károly Rácz, head of the Semmelweis University Doctoral Council did not wish to comment on the allegations of plagiarism regarding Schmitt's dissertation, stating that the dr. univ. degree was not awarded by the doctoral school that issues PhD titles introduced in 1993.

On 13 January Miklós Tóth, the dean of the Faculty of Sport Sciences at Semmelweis University issued a statement claiming that the evaluation and the issuance of the dr. univ. title was conducted according to standard procedures and that according to experts the content of the dissertation adhered to the requirements at that time. He further stated that "there is no reason to assume that the thesis committee did not deliver a well-founded decision" when it assessed Schmitt's 1992 dissertation.

On 17 January Tivadar Tulassay, the rector of the Semmelweis University instructed Miklós Tóth, the dean of Faculty of Sport Sciences, to assemble a committee of inquiry to investigate "the circumstances under which Pál Schmitt’s doctoral dissertation came into being."

On 21 January Népszabadság reported that experts qualified to assess the allegations are turning down requests to participate in the work of the committee of inquiry. In the opinion of Népszabadság this is obviously due to the politically sensitive nature of the issue.

On 24 January Népszabadság reported that the Semmelweis University is exploring the possibility asking experts from outside the country to examine Schmitt's doctoral dissertation. These experts would investigate whether the quotations in the dissertation form Georgiev's and Heinemann's works have been used correctly and according to the regulations. It is argued that if the suspected plagiarism is confirmed, then it will be easier to carry out the necessary administrative and legal measures.

The same day Heti Világgazdaság wrote that its sources confirmed the earlier reports that experts are turning down requests to participate in the work of the committee that is designated to investigate the allegations of plagiarism in Schmitt's dissertation. According to the sources of Heti Világgazdaság, the reason for the experts' reluctance is a fear that they may suffer a disadvantage in their careers. University sources did not confirm the reports that the university is considering to ask for the participation of experts from outside the country. Semmelweis University ordered a news black-out but, according to the sources of Heti Világgazdaság, the university would like to see the case closed as soon as possible, although the investigations could be prolonged until autumn 2013.

On 25 January Miklós Tóth, the dean of the Faculty of Sport Sciences at Semmelweis University, announced that a five-member fact-finding committee had been set up, and would deliver a report by 28 March. The committee included both external and internal members, experts in linguistics, law, sports and the social sciences. The members of the committee remained anonymous for the duration of the investigation.

=== Members of the fact-finding committee ===
The members of the fact-finding committee were:

- Miklós Tóth: dean of the Faculty of Sport Sciences, Semmelweis University
- Ákos Fluck: lawyer
- János Gombocz: Department of Physical Education Theory and Pedagogy, Semmelweis University
- Etele Kovács: Department of Athletics, Semmelweis University
- Károly Rácz: President of the Doctoral Council, School of Doctoral Studies, Semmelweis University

Issues of conflicts of interest have been raised with regard to the fact-finding committee; Népszabadság found it problematic that Miklós Tóth became dean and a member of the MOB after the FIDESZ-KDNP government took office, and he became vice-president of the Olympic Committee during the course of the investigation.

=== Majority report ===
The committee released a 3-page summary of its 1,100-page report to the public on 28 March. The report states that the 197 pages in question were indeed verbatim copies of Georgiev's and Heinemann's respective works. However, the report also states the lack of citations and references were "formal mistakes" that should have been addressed by the supervisors, who, by failing to do so, could have led Schmitt to believe that the thesis met the requirements. Semmelweis University, citing privacy reasons, has not made the majority report public. Heti Világgazdaság filed a complaint about the university's argument with the Hungarian National Authority for Data Protection and Freedom of Information. The summary, after establishing the legal context for awarding the dr. univ. title at the University of Physical Education, has the following sections.

==== Procedure ====
The report notes that conspicuously (although not against the regulations), the defense took place barely a month after registration. Some missing documents, however, imply formal irregularities. Namely, the thesis proposal, the report on the comprehensive examination, and the minutes of the thesis committee could not be found. The report faults the thesis advisor and the examiners for not alerting the candidate to the inappropriate or absent citations, which are largely typical of the thesis. Further procedural errors are implied by the lack of proper bibliography (5 out of 21 cited references could not be identified; out of 23 self-citations, 10 could not be found, and 3 were cited wrongly).

==== Thesis ====
The report asserts that the author did not indicate his sources anywhere in the thesis. The text uses neither quotation marks, nor author names in parentheses, nor footnotes, nor endnotes. The committee also notes that the thesis does not contain any acknowledgments of support from collaborators. The report notes in particular the textual identities with Klaus Heinemann's work, the figures and tables copied (with occasional minor modifications) from Nikolay Georgiev's manuscript, and further 180 text pages partially matching the same work.

==== Conclusion ====
The report draws the conclusion that the thesis procedure was, notwithstanding the procedural shortcomings, in accordance with the practices of the University of Physical Education at the time. The thesis is based on a word-by-word translation of "unusually large extent," which should have been detected at the defense. The report faults the University of Physical Education for leading the author believe that this thesis met the requirements.

=== Minority report ===
The only external member of the fact-finding committee, Ákos Fluck, submitted a minority report that became public on the evening of 27 March. The minority report notes that it has been established that figure 1 of Schmitt's dissertation is a photocopy of the figure on page 10 of Georgiev's work. The report also notes that at one time Schmitt refers to a figure 10 in the text, while the dissertation does not have ten figures; this part of the text is a direct translation taken from Georgiev's work, which indeed has a figure 10. In the minority report, Ákos Fluck wrote: "Based on the fact-finding work, an investigation into the possibility of, as well as the procedures for, withdrawing the doctorate title from the candidate is advised." The minority report also recounted that Schmitt had received the fact-finding committee's chair in his office. The chair communicated Schmitt's opinion to the other committee members: Schmitt's good faith should not be questioned, since he was not alerted by his advisor and thesis committee about any possible shortcomings, thus echoing the fact-finding report's conclusion.

=== Reactions to the report ===
The report has met considerable controversy upon release, with members of opposition claiming that the Semmelweis University caved in to political pressure.

==== Pál Schmitt ====
Pál Schmitt was attending the 2012 Seoul Nuclear Security Summit in South Korea at the time the three-page summary of the fact-finding committee was made public. Speaking of the report Schmitt told the MTI that "this final conclusion is a kind of satisfaction for [him]: I was right even back then 20 years ago, because I wrote a thesis to the best of my knowledge and in keeping with the circumstances and the requirements of the time". He also said that he did "not for a moment" think that he would resign, as qualities other than his doctorate were the reasons for his election. Schmitt returned from the summit to Hungary at 10:30 pm (CET).

==== Government coalition ====
On 27 March Fidesz spokesperson Gabriella Selmeczi said that "given the report of the fact-finding committee of the Semmelweis University, Fidesz considers the case closed". In a press release the Christian Democratic People's Party (KDNP) stated that the report "can bring satisfying closure to the allegations that questioned the originality of the president's dissertation".

==== Klaus Heinemann ====
In a letter to Index, Klaus Heinemann called the report's majority conclusion "ridiculous nonsense". In his opinion, had the committee appointed to investigate the allegations of plagiarism of zu Guttenberg come to the same conclusion—that is, putting the blame on the university itself—"they would have won a prize for their excellent cabaret-joke" and "everyone would still be laughing at them to this day". According to Index, Heinemann was unaware that Schmitt's doctorate had been revoked by the University Senate.

== University decision ==
Tivadar Tulassay, the rector of Semmelweis University forwarded the fact-finding committee's report to Minister of National Resources Miklós Réthelyi on 27 March 2012. The university was of the opinion that only the Ministry had the authority to initiate the revocation of the dr. univ. title (citing a legal article on degrees awarded by defunct institutions of higher education). The Minister returned the report the following day, citing lack of jurisdiction.

The rector of the Semmelweis University announced on 29 March that the Semmelweis University Council would launch proceedings in order to withdraw Schmitt's doctorate title.

The same day the University Senate voted 33–4 to withdraw Schmitt's doctorate title.

=== Reactions ===
==== Pál Schmitt ====
Schmitt canceled all his appointments for 30 March and Norbert Kiss, the Public Relations Manager of the Office of the President announced that at 8 pm Schmitt "is going to answer all questions" in a TV interview.

On 30 March 9 pm M1 aired a 15-minute, pre-recorded, heavily orchestrated interview in which Schmitt announced that he would not resign from office, as there was no connection between his role as president and his doctorate. He said that he had acted in good faith regarding his dissertation, and that he had been led to believe by his thesis committee that his conduct had been correct, effectively repeating the majority conclusion of the Semmelweis University fact-finding committee. He also said that he intended to write a new dissertation and acquire a Ph.D. degree.

==== Government parties ====
On 29 March Botond Szalma, the president of KDNP's Budapest group issued a statement in which he hailed the decision of the University Council and asked for the apology or resignation of those politicians who were "working on ways to cover up this scandal instead of bringing the truth to light." He added: "a sin must be called a sin, black must be called black, and white must be called white, as Christian morality dictates".

On 31 March, after Schmitt announced that he was not considering resignation, KDNP issued a press release distancing the party from Szalma's statements, saying: "The Christian Democratic People's Party would like to stress that the statements of the president of the Budapest group in the recent days do not reflect the views of the party as a whole, and the statements he made openly go against the official stance of the KDNP".

==== Batthyány Society of Professors ====
Soon after the controversy erupted, Rezső Lovas, the president of the Batthyány Society of Professors (PBK), a pro-government group of university lecturers, said that in his opinion it is unlikely that the allegations can be proven valid.

On 29 March, after the Semmelweis University Council decided to initiate the revocation of Schmitt's doctorate, the Society issued a press release stating that "The Doctoral Council has drawn the conclusions on the matter for its part. We hope that the president will do the same." They further state that "at a time when we are suffering from a double standard used against our homeland, it is of utmost importance to have only one standard in our country, and that standard should be applied to everyone. In the current difficult situation that the country is in, there is a need for a president who is respected both at home and abroad."

The Batthyány Society of Professors came under criticism because of its handling of the case of Schmitt's plagiarism. Because of the support given to Schmitt and the lack of appropriate response an article on hirszerzo.hu termed the right-wing, Christian groups of academics and intelligentsia (such as the PBK, the Hungarian Association for Civic Cooperation and the Society of Christian Intellectuals) the "Schmittpali Society of Professors". A 31 March essay on Heti Világgazdaság called the Society "professors abusing the name of Batthyány".

==== Hungarian Accreditation Committee ====
On 2 April the president of the Hungarian Accreditation Committee announced that the decision of the University Senate was legitimate according to relevant regulations.

=== Rector's resignation ===
On 1 April Tivadar Tulassay resigned as rector of Semmelweis University. He had served as rector for nine years and his term would have ended on 1 July. As the reason for his immediate resignation, he cited a "fundamental loss of trust" that he perceived on the part of Minister of National Resources, Miklós Réthelyi, and State Secretary for Education, Rózsa Hoffmann, during the decision-making process. He also stated that he stands behind the decision made by the University Senate, on ethical, professional and legal grounds.

=== Resignation ===
According to a poll conducted by Medián and published on 18 January 6% of Fidesz voters expressed the opinion that Schmitt should resign. 77% of the MSZP, LMP and DK, 28% of Jobbik supporters and 30% of independent voters thought that he should not remain in office. Taking the whole sample into consideration, 33% of the population thought that Schmitt should resign, while 42% thought that he should remain in office, the remaining 25% expressed no opinion.

On 2 April, the Hungarian Parliament received Schmitt's resignation from the office of President.

On 15 May 2013, Schmitt formally resigned from his doctorate after an academic remedy commission declared that his thesis did not meet the criteria, either in terms of content or formal requirements.

== See also ==
- Zsolt Semjén academic misconduct controversy
- Ferenc Gyurcsány plagiarism controversy
- Karl-Theodor zu Guttenberg – Doctorate plagiarism
- Silvana Koch-Mehrin – Doctorate plagiarism
- VroniPlag Wiki
- Katalin Novák presidential pardon scandal
