= Zsolt Semjén academic misconduct controversy =

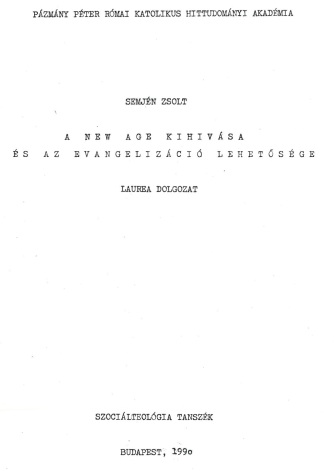
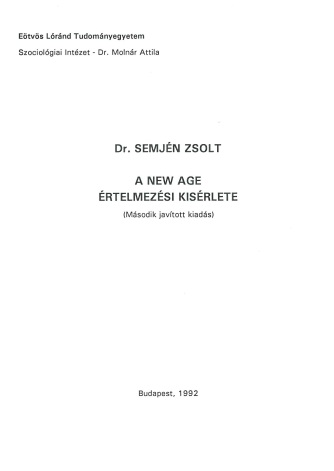
The title pages of Semjén's 1991 laureatus dissertation,"The challenge of New Age and opportunity for evangelization"(left) and his 1992 sociology diploma thesis, "An attempted interpretation of New Age", second, revised edition (right)

The Zsolt Semjén academic misconduct controversy refers to allegations of plagiarism and multiple submission concerning the 1991 laureatus thesis in theology (converted in 1997 to a PhD in religious studies) and the 1992 sociology diploma thesis of Deputy Prime Minister of Hungary and head of the Christian Democratic People's Party (KDNP) Zsolt Semjén.

On 18 November 2012 Hungarian magazine Heti Világgazdaság published an article which claimed that material that amounts to 40 percent of Semjén's 122 pages long laureatus dissertation (entitled "The challenge of New Age and opportunity for evangelization"), defended in 1991 at the Pázmány Péter Roman Catholic Theological Academy, has been taken from various sources without proper citation.

On 19 November Heti Világgazdaság reported that 32–33 pages of Semjén's 46 pages long sociology diploma thesis (entitled "An attempted interpretation of New Age"), defended in 1992 at the Eötvös Loránd University (ELTE), is overlapping with his laureatus dissertation which he already submitted and defended.

On 26 November Heti Világgazdaság revealed that the second, revised edition of Semjén's 1992 sociology diploma thesis contains 12–13 pages worth of additional material that had in 1993 appeared as an article in the journal Valóság by his thesis advisor, Attila Molnár. According to Heti Világgazdaság, Semjén did dot cite Molnár in his thesis, neither did Molnár refer to Semjén in the 1993 article.

At first Nikosz Fokasz, the head of sociology department and Katalin Tausz, the dean of the Faculty of Social Sciences at the Eötvös Loránd University were not planning an inquiry, but on 29 November she announced that a three-member committee is going to investigate the allegations. According to this investigation, concluded on 7 December, Zsolt Semjén has committed serious ethical, professional misconduct, but ELTE is not in the position to take official action. Nevertheless, twelve lecturers at ELTE consider Semjén's thesis invalid until he and Molnár clarify the situation. Heti Világgazdaság calls the investigation incomplete, and criticizes the committee for failing to address important questions such as the issues of self-plagiarism, plagiarism from authors other than Molnár, and the regulations allowing for the submission of a revised edition of a thesis

The Pázmány Péter Catholic University is not investigating the charges against Semjén, and considers the case closed.

The Prime Minister's office called the charges a "campaign of slander", and Christian Democratic politicians and pundits have referred to the allegations as a part of a coordinated attack against Catholics, and against Christianity in general.

This is the third plagiarism scandal in Hungary involving a high-profile politician in 2012, following that of Pál Schmitt (see Pál Schmitt academic misconduct controversy) – which led to Schmitt's resignation as President of Hungary –, and former prime minister Ferenc Gyurcsány (see Ferenc Gyurcsány plagiarism controversy), in whose case plagiarism remained unproven as his dissertation couldn't be found.

== Zsolt Semjén ==
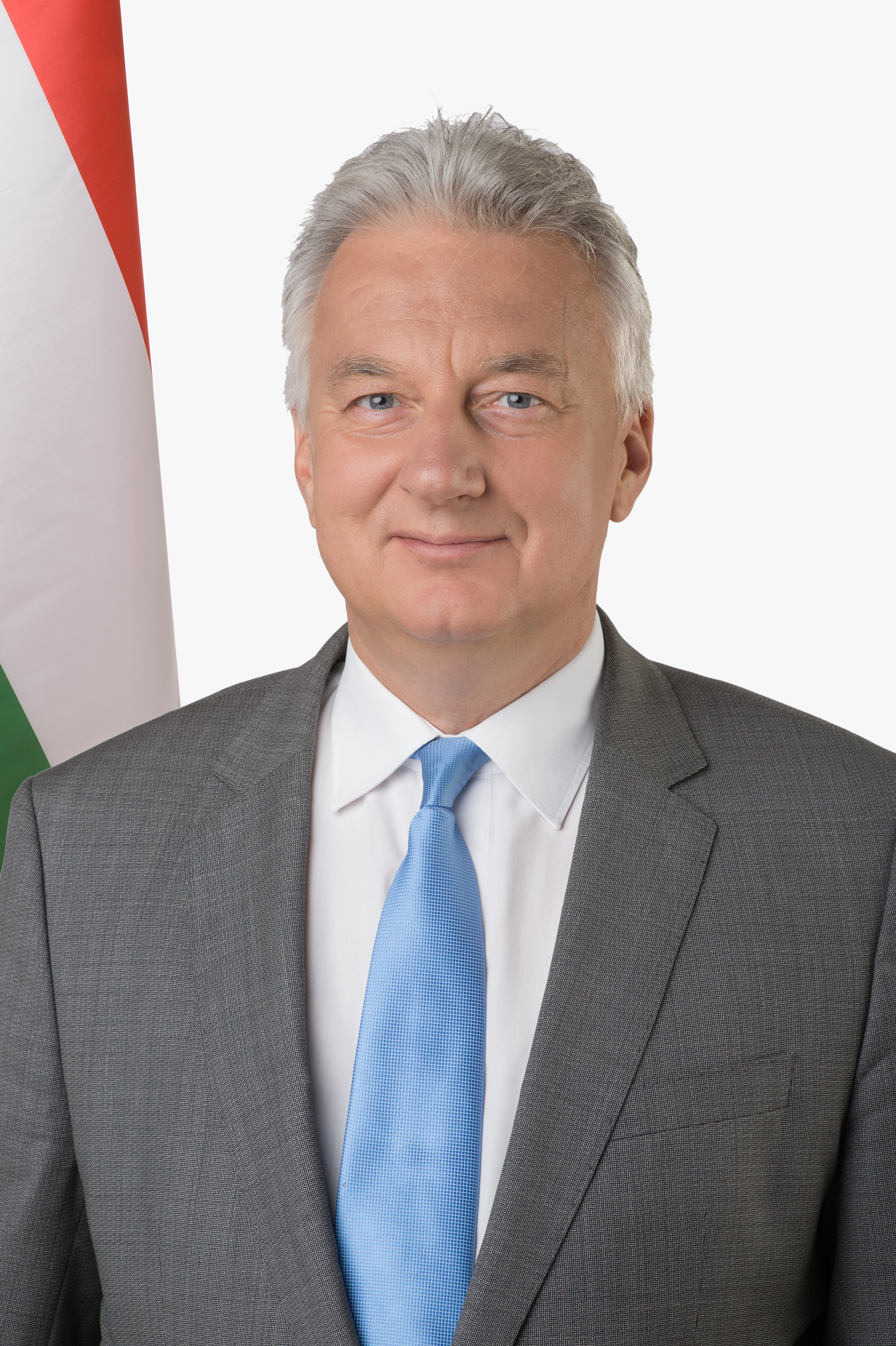
Zsolt Semjén

Zsolt Semjén (born 8 August 1962 in Budapest) is a Hungarian politician, currently minister without portfolio and Deputy Prime Minister in the second cabinet of Prime Minister Viktor Orbán. Semjén is the leader of the Christian Democratic People's Party (KDNP) since 2003, which formed a coalition and alliance with Fidesz.

He studied in theology at the Pázmány Péter Roman Catholic Theological Academy, now Pázmány Péter Catholic University. He obtained his laureatus degree in 1991. In 1992 he graduated at Eötvös Loránd University, Budapest with a diploma in sociology. In 1997, based on the high quality of the work and Semjén's subsequent scientific achievements, the Pázmány Péter Catholic University converted his laureatus degree to a PhD in religious studies.

In 1989, he was among the founders of the Christian Democratic People's Party. He was a member of the executive committee and employee of the National Assembly. From 1990 to 1994 he served as district councillor. In 1994 he obtained a parliamentary seat in 1997, he was the deputy leader of KDNP. Soon he left the party, joined the faction of the Hungarian Democratic Forum. In 1998, Viktor Orbán gave him the position of secretary of state for the church. In 2002 Zsolt Semjén returned to parliament from a list of Fidesz and the Christian Democrats.

Soon, he rejoined the extra-parliamentary KDNP then, and in 2003 became chairman of this party. In both 2006 and 2010 his parliamentary mandate was renewed. In the second, Fidesz-KDNP coalition government of Viktor Orbán he became minister without portfolio and Deputy Prime Minister.

== Allegations of misconduct ==
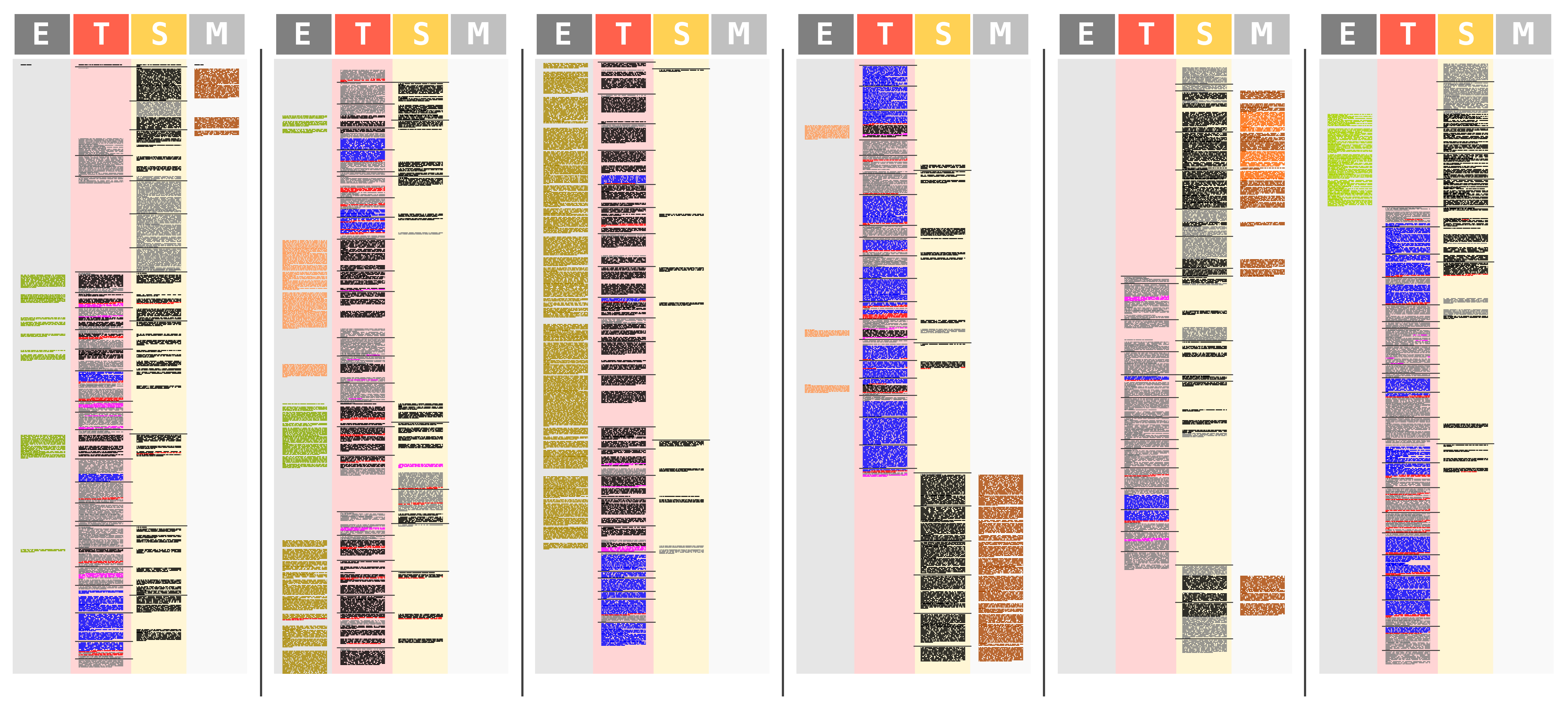
Semjén's theology dissertation shown separately Semjén's sociology dissertation shown separately Corresponding sections in Semjén's works and other sources according to hvg.hu, as of 12 December 2012. E: External sources, T: Zsolt Semjén's 1991 theology laureatus dissertation ("The challenge of New Age and opportunity for evangelization"), S: Zsolt Semjén's 1992 sociology diploma thesis, ("An attempted interpretation of New Age") 2nd, revised edition, M: two publications by Attila Molnár (1993, 1992/1999) External Sources: ██ Stefan Üblackner: Der Traum vom "New Age". Stadt Gottes (1989) January, February, March ██ Helmuth von Glasenapp: Die fünf großen Religionen (Translated to Hungarian with the title Az öt világvallás. Budapest, Gondolat, 1975) ██ Lewis Spence: The Encyclopedia of the Occult. London, Bracken Books, 1988 ██ Lothar Gassmann: New age – kommt die Welteinheitsreligion?, 1987 ██ Verbatim quotations, referenced correctly. Publications by Attila Molnár: ██ Molnár Attila: "Az új vallási jelenségek", In: Valóság, 1993. 5. szám ██ Molnár Attila Károly: "A vallás és politika napjainkban". 1992. In: Feljegyzések a Kaotikus Fegyházból. Budapest, Kairosz, 1999. Notes in Semjén's texts: ██ References ██ Footnotes

=== Plagiarism in the theology dissertation ===
The known extent of extraneous text in Zsolt Semjén's 1991 theology laureatus dissertation. Identified sources: ██ Stefan Üblackner: Der Traum vom "New Age". Stadt Gottes (1989) January, February, March ██ Helmuth von Glasenapp: Die fünf großen Religionen (Translated to Hungarian with the title Az öt világvallás. Budapest, Gondolat, 1975) ██ Lewis Spence: The Encyclopedia of the Occult. London, Bracken Books, 1988 (first edition: 1920) note, that in some instances these works have been referenced in the text ██ Extensive verbatim quotations, referenced correctly. ██ Own work/unknown source The title page and the table of contents are marked as ██.

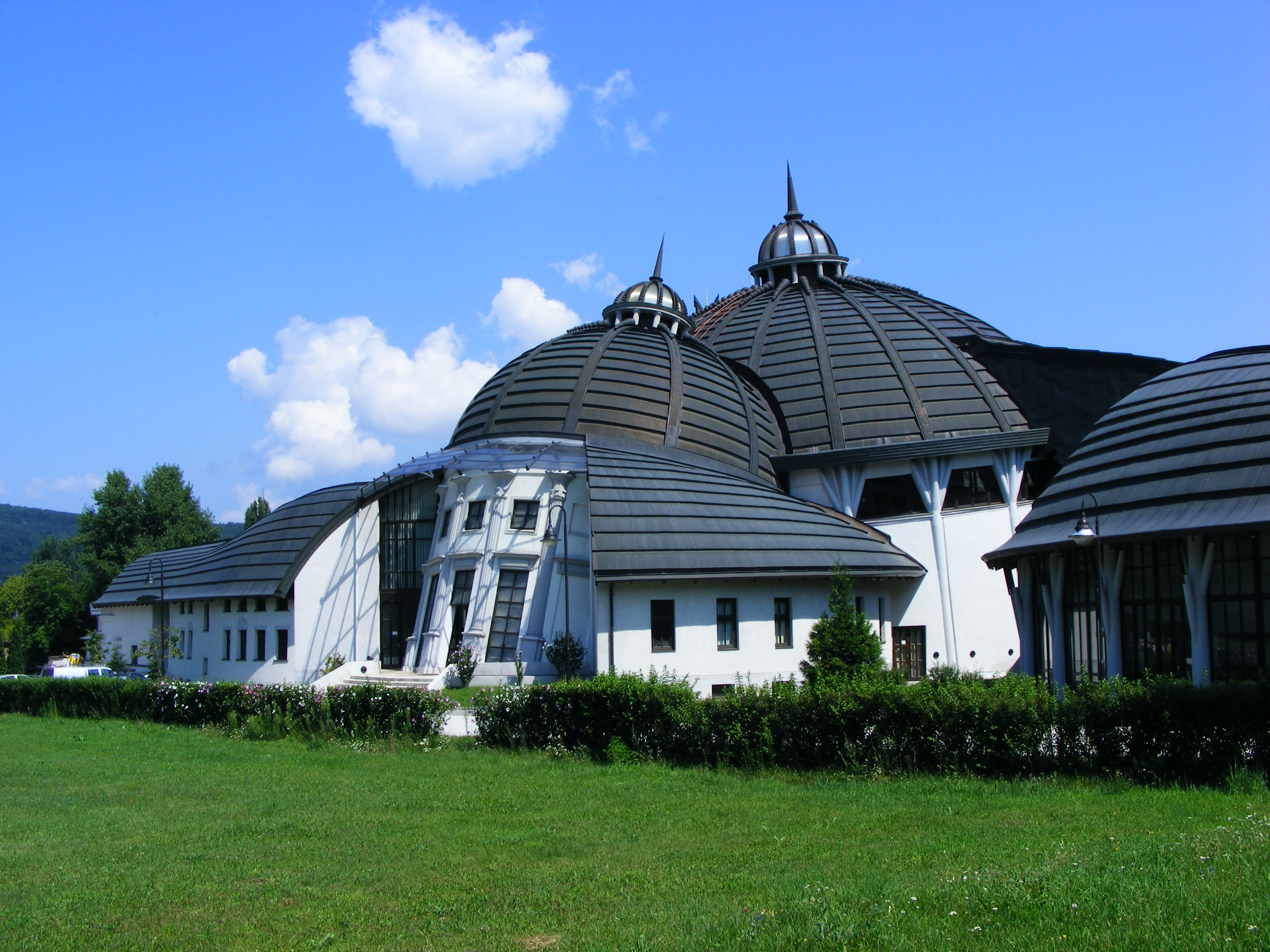
The main building of the Pázmány Péter Catholic University

According to the November 18 article by hvg.hu, in his 1991 laureatus dissertation,"The challenge of New Age and opportunity for evangelization" Semjén used parts of the following works without referencing them properly:

- Helmuth von Glasenapp: Die fünf großen Religionen (Translated to Hungarian with the title "Az öt világvallás". Budapest, Gondolat, 1975)
- Stefan Üblackner: Der Traum Vom „New Age”. Stadt Gottes, 1989. January, February, and March
- Lewis Spence: The Encyclopedia of the Occult. London, Bracken Books, 1988 (first edition: 1920)

According to hvg.hu, in some cases Semjén copied various sections word-by-word, in other cases he omitted certain words, replaced them with synonyms, or reversed the word order.

In addition to the improperly sourced material the dissertation also contains a significant amount of text (about 25%, as estimated by hvg.hu) consisting of properly referenced, verbatim quotations.

Although his opponents described parts of his thesis as "rushed, […] therefore incomplete", and "too superficial, and hard to go through", Semjén received a summa cum laude for the dissertation from the thesis committee.

Based on the perceived high quality of the work and Semjén's subsequent scientific achievements, the Pázmány Péter Catholic University converted his laureatus degree in theology to a PhD in religious studies in 1997.

=== Multiple submission ===
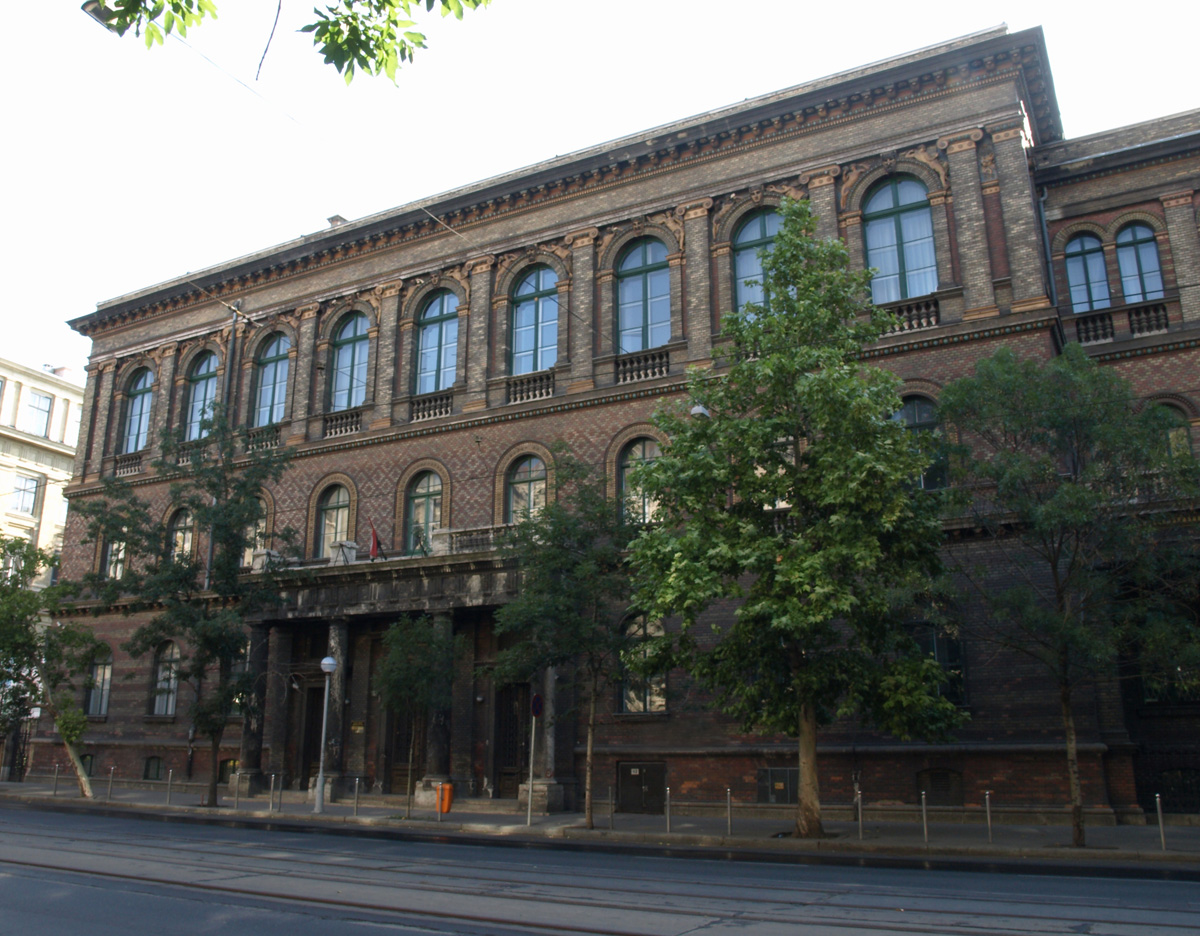
The main building of the Eötvös Loránd University

On 19 November hvg.hu published an article claiming that 32–33 pages of Semjén's 46 pages long sociology diploma thesis (entitled "An attempted interpretation of New Age"), defended in 1992 at the Eötvös Loránd University (ELTE), is overlapping with his laureatus dissertation which he already submitted and defended in 1991.

Hvg.hu reported that the overlapping material is in part taken word-by-word from the theology dissertation, in other cases the text is slightly reformulated, simplified or abbreviated. Semjén also took material from the theology dissertation that was already taken from an external source.

In some cases, material that had been cited properly in the 1991 dissertation is present in the 1992 thesis, but without quotation marks and any indication of origin.

According to hvg.hu, Semjén did not indicate, either the text or in the bibliography, that he had already written and defended a thesis on the same subject.

On 20 November hvg.hu reported that at the time of its submission, Semjén's sociology diploma thesis sparked controversy among its reviewers. One of the reviewers gave Semjén the best possible grade (5 out of 5), the other reviewer gave him a failing grade (1 out of 5), on the basis that it was a theological, rather than a sociological work. Issues regarding the general quality of the work have also been raised.

Mihály Csákó, deputy director of the Institute of Sociology and Social Policy at ELTE at the time of Semjén's defence, told hvg.hu that the problem with Semjén's dissertation was that it did not fit into the profile of the department, did not draw conclusions relevant to sociology, mainly contained a review of the literature, and it "contained few original thoughts". The controversy was resolved by inviting a third reviewer, who gave Semjén a 4 (out of 5) grade.

==== Allegations of plagiarism in the second, revised edition ====
The known extent of extraneous text in Zsolt Semjén's 1991 sociology diploma thesis, 2nd edition. Identified sources: ██ Pages containing text from Semjén's own 1991 theology laureatus dissertation, itself containing not properly referenced extraneous material ██ Pages containing text identical or largely similar to Attila Molnár's 1993 article in Valóság and his 1992/1999 article in Feljegyzések a Kaotikus Fegyházból ██ A table taken without reference, from Lothar Gassmann: New age – kommt die Welteinheitsreligion?, 1987 The title page, the table of contents, and the notes and references are marked as ██.

On 26 November hvg.hu revealed that the second, revised edition of Semjén's 1992 sociology diploma thesis contains 12–13 pages worth of additional material that had in 1993 appeared as an article in the journal Valóság by his thesis advisor, Attila Molnár. Hvg.hu believes that the revision was necessitated by the failing grade given by one of the reviewers, contains the missing sociological content the reviewer felt was missing, and had been compiled in two and a half weeks. According to hvg.hu, Semjén did not cite Molnár in his thesis, neither did Molnár refer to Semjén in the 1993 article.

Below is an excerpt from Semjén's revised dissertation, the corresponding section from Molnár's 1993 Valóság article (both reproduced from the hvg.hu article), and an English translation of Semjén's text. The differences between Semjén's and Molnár's works are highlighted in blue.

Semjén, 1992	Molnár, 1993	English translation (Semjén, 1992)
A mai társadalomtudományi közgondolkodásban erősen tartja magát az a képzet, hogy a modern társadalom szekularizálódott. A világ varázstalanítása, vagy a vallás és intézményeinek szükségszerű háttérbe szorulását hirdető elméletek a mai napig szerfölött népszerűek. Pedig már többen kimutatták a szekularizációs elméletek logikai problémáit (Shiner, Dobbelaere, Martin, Wilson), és a szekularizációs elméletek inkább ideológiai, mint tudományos jellegét. Mára elérkeztünk oda, hogy a vallásszociológusok között sokkal kevésbé elterjedt ez az elmélet, mint a többi szakszociológus és értelmiségi között. Az utóbbi évtizedekben a szekularizáció elmélet kritikái mellett megjelentek azok az írások, amelyek a vallás valamilyen újjáéledéséről beszélnek (Beckford, Bell). A szent visszatértéről szóló elméletek elsősorban nem statisztikákra támaszkodnak, hanem a vallás új formáinak megjelenésére vagy a régiek felelevenedésére. Az előbbihez tartoznak az új egyházak, vallások, míg az utóbbira példa a vallási fundamentalizmus felerősödése az iszlám és a keresztény világban.	A mai közgondolkodásban erősen tartja magát az a képzet, hogy a modern társadalom szekularizált, és ez hosszú, visszafordíthatatlan folyamat, fejlődés eredménye. A világ varázstalanítását vagy a vallás és intézményeinek háttérbe szorulását hirdető elméletek a mai napig szerfölött népszerűek. Pedig már többen kimutatták a szekularizációs elméletek (eredeti politikai szándék jellegükből sokat megőriztek) logikai problémáit, és a szekularizációs elmélet inkább ideológiai, mint tudományos jellegét. Ma a vallásszociológusok között sokkal kevésbé egyértelmű ez az elmélet, mint a többi társadalomtudós és értelmiségi között. A szekularizációs elmélet kritikái mellett ugyanakkor megjelentek az elmúlt évtizedben a vallás valamilyen újjászületéséről szóló elemzések. Ezek, a szent visszatértéről szóló elméletek elsősorban nem statisztikákra támaszkodnak, hanem a vallás új formáinak megjelenésére vagy a régi megelevenedésére. Az előbbihez tartoznak az új vallások, míg az utóbbira példa a fundamentalizmus felerősödése.	In today's public opinion in social science the idea strongly holds that modern society is secularized. The removal of magic from the world, or the theories that proclaim the necessity of moving religion and its institutions into the background are still exceedingly popular. But the logical problems of theories of secularization have already been highlighted by many (Shiner, Dobbelaere, Martin, Wilson), and that the secularization theories are more ideological than scientific in nature. As of today, this theory is much less common among sociologists of religion than among other professional sociologists and intellectuals. In the last decades, besides the criticism of secularization theory, writings that speak of some form of revival of religion also appeared (Beckford, Bell). The theories that speak of the return of the sacred are not primarily based on statistics, but on the emergence of new forms of religion or the revitalization of the old. New churches and religions belong to the former, while an example of latter is the intensification of religious fundamentalism in the Islamic and in the Christian world.

On 29 November hvg.hu reported that they have identified material in Semjén's sociology dissertation that is largely identical to another publication authored by Molnár. The article A vallás és politika napjainkban appeared in a book in 1999, but according to the description, it was written in 1992.

Molnár denied using parts of Semjén's work, and said that they have at the time collaborated on a joint study in the field of sociology of religion.

In an article based on internal documents and information provided by sources inside ELTE, nol.hu wrote on 16 January 2013 that Molnár prepared lecture notes based mainly on non-Hungarian language literature, findings of his studies conducted at universities abroad, and summaries of various lectures and debates. These notes were left unpublished, and existed in a manuscript form, to which his students who attended his lectures, Semjén among them, were granted access. According to nol.hu, the overlapping material in Semjén's work is based on literature unavailable in Hungarian libraries.

=== Accreditation and the conversion process ===
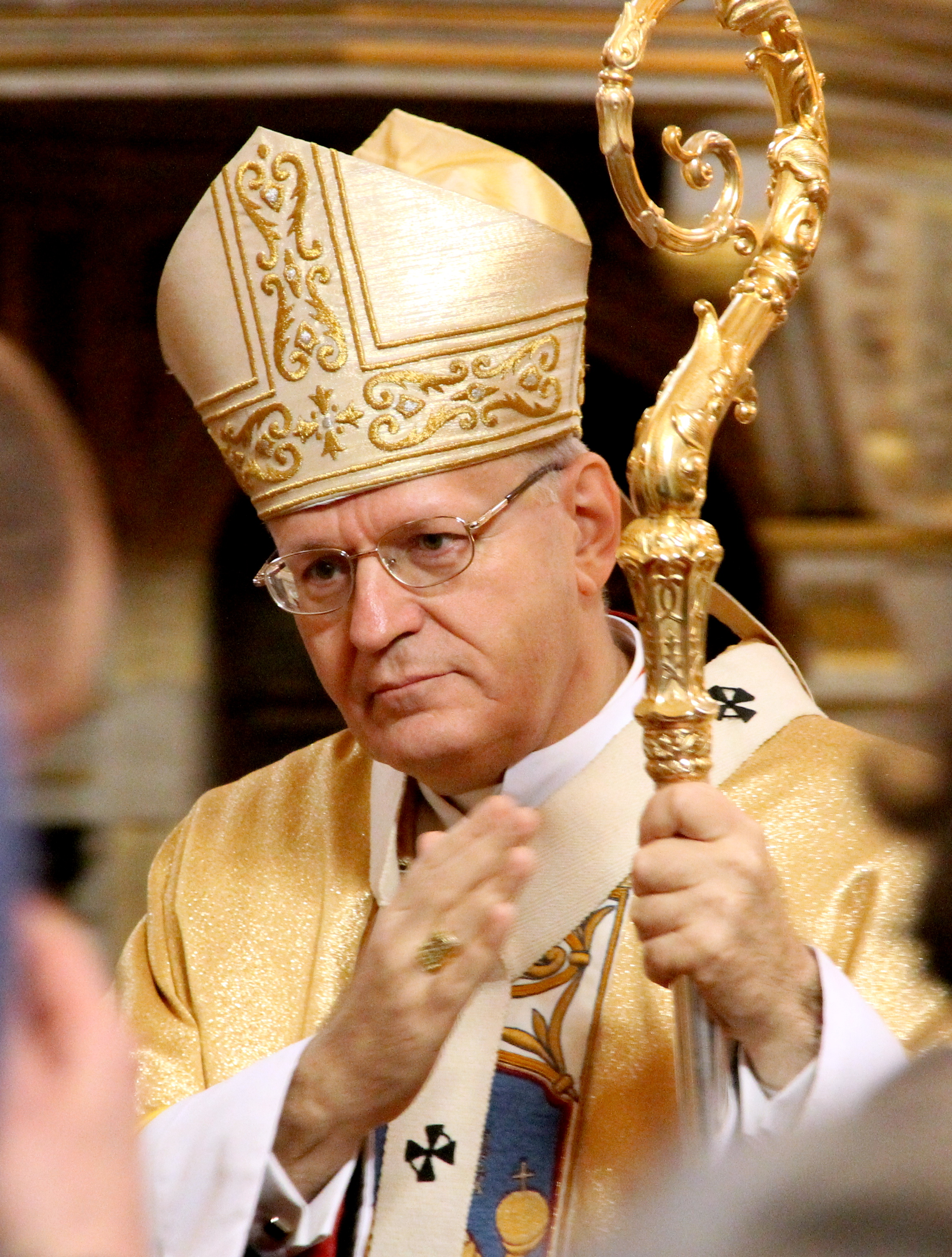
Péter Erdő, Archbishop of Esztergom-Budapest, then dean of the Theological Faculty at the Pázmány Péter Catholic University, signed the document allowing the conversion of Semjén's doctorate.

On 19 November Népszava Online raised questions regarding the circumstances of the conversion of Semjén's laureatus degree in theology to a PhD degree in religious studies.

In some contemporary contexts, a distinction is made between theology, which is seen as involving some level of commitment to the claims of the religious tradition being studied, and religious studies, which is not. By contrast religious studies is normally seen as requiring that the question of the truth or falsehood of the religious traditions studied is kept outside its field. Religious studies involves the study of the historical or contemporary practices or ideas those traditions using intellectual tools and frameworks that are not themselves specifically tied to any religious tradition, and that are normally understood to be neutral or secular.

At the time of Semjén's laureatus defence the Pázmány Péter Roman Catholic Theological Academy was not accredited by the state, and did not have a religious studies program.

According to the Higher Education Act of 1993 a committee set up by the university, in accordance with the Hungarian Accreditation Commission (MAB), had the authority to convert doctorates awarded previously on a case-by-case basis, until the end of 1997. Semjén's laureatus degree was converted to a PhD in December 1997, just before the deadline. Péter Erdő, now Archbishop of Esztergom-Budapest, then dean of the Theological Faculty at the Pázmány Péter Catholic University, signed the document granting the conversion of Semjén's doctorate.

Népszava questioned whether Erdő, as dean, had the authority to grant the conversion, and the basis on which he authorized the conversion of a theology degree to a religious studies degree, the two being different disciplines.

In response to these questions Szabolcs Szuromi, rector of Pázmány Péter Catholic University told hvg.hu that an international committee, set up by the university, had dealt with the conversion of degrees issued before 1997, and the university was authorized by the Hungarian Accreditation Commission to convert previously awarded degrees to PhD degrees. He also told hvg.hu that since theology was not at the time in the national register of disciplines, the Hungarian Accreditation Commission recognized the program as religious studies.

In an article on 22 December Népszabadság questioned the statements of the rector of the PPKE regarding the conversion of Semjén's degree.

The conversion process was not a formality, but a substantive, case by case decision, for which it had to be assessed whether those applying were in compliance with the conditions and regulations of earning a PhD at the time of the conversion. The examination of the candidate's publications and scientific work was needed in every case.

Népszabadság recalled that Péter Erdő authorized the conversion of Semjén's doctorate based on the good quality of his dissertation, his subsequent studies in other areas and scientific achievements.

According to Népszabadság, considering the regulations, "subsequent studies in other areas" and the "quality of the dissertation" are matters of no relevance, but consecutive scientific achievements are decisive factors.

Regarding Semjén's scientific achievements Népszabadság found only one article authored by Semjén in the Hungarian-language journal Teológia ("Challenges of our time: the New Age", 1992), which contained no new findings, instead, it was a summary of his theology dissertation and its derivative, his sociology thesis. Semjén's scientific carrier begun in 1996 (one year before the PhD conversion) with his appointment to honorary associate professorship at the Pázmány Péter Catholic University. (Népszabadság notes, that while there are relatively few restrictions regarding the endowment of honorary lectureships, many universities require the candidates to have PhD degrees and to be recognized authorities in the given field – none of these criteria applied to Semjén.)

In the opinion of Népszabadság, based on these facts, Semjén did not earn his PhD on the merits of his scientific achievements. The magazine notes that at the time Semjén participated actively in the preparation of the intergovernmental agreement between the Republic of Hungary and the Vatican and in communicating the position of the Church. Népszabadság highlighted Semjén's statement regarding the justification for why a secular state – the taxpayers' community – should financially support the churches – in his opinion, they are of paramount importance as forgers of communities and sources of values, and beside their religious works they play a significant role in the life of the country with their cultural, educational, social, and medical activities and with the servicing of the national consciousness thus maintaining them through public funds is considered a public matter.

=== Summary of the claims ===
Issue	Claim	Raised by	Date	Resolution	Date
Plagiarism	Material that amounts to 40 percent of Semjén's 1991 laureatus dissertation, defended at the Pázmány Péter Roman Catholic Theological Academy, has been taken from various sources without proper citation.	hvg.hu	18 November 2012	Unresolved, as the PPKE is not conducting an investigation	n/a
Multiple submission	32–33 pages of Semjén's 46 pages long 1992 sociology diploma thesis at the Eötvös Loránd University is overlapping with his laureatus dissertation which he already submitted and defended.	hvg.hu	19 November 2012	Unresolved, as the ELTE investigation did not address this issue	n/a
Plagiarism	Semjén's sociology dissertation (the second, revised edition) contains sections he properly cited in his theology dissertation, but failed to reference in his sociology thesis, e.g. sections by Roman Catholic theologians István Előd and László Vanyó, and an unreferenced three pages long table from a publication by German Lutheran theologian Lothar Gassmann.	hvg.hu	19 November 2012	Unresolved, as the ELTE investigation did not address this issue	n/a
Plagiarism / Ethical misconduct	The second, revised edition of Semjén's 1992 sociology diploma thesis contains 12–13 pages worth of additional material that had in 1993 appeared as an article in the journal Valóság by his thesis advisor, Attila Molnár.	hvg.hu	26 November 2012	Partially resolved: The ELTE investigation found that this statement is correct – the role of Molnár was not investigated	7 December 2012
Plagiarism / Ethical misconduct	Sections of Semjén's sociology dissertation are largely identical to a publication authored by Molnár. A vallás és politika napjainkban appeared in a book in 1999, but according to the description, it was written in 1992.	hvg.hu	29 November 2012	Partially resolved: The ELTE investigation found that this statement is correct – the role of Molnár was not investigated	7 December 2012
Possible procedural misconduct	The question weather the regulations in 1992 allowed for the rewriting and resubmitting of a thesis that had been given a failing grade by one of the reviewers, instead of the third additional reviewer receiving the same work for evaluation the original reviewers have assessed.	hvg.hu	14 December 2012	Unresolved, as the ELTE investigation did not address this issue	n/a
Possible procedural misconduct	The question whether Péter Erdő, as dean of the Theological Faculty at the Pázmány Péter Catholic University in 1997, had the authority to grant the conversion of Semjén's doctorate.	Népszava Online	19 November 2012	PPKE: An international committee, set up by the university, had dealt with the conversion of degrees issued before 1997, and the university was authorized by the Hungarian Accreditation Commission to convert previously awarded degrees to PhD degrees.	20 November 2012
Possible procedural misconduct	The basis on which Semjén's theology degree was converted to a religious studies degree, the two being different disciplines.	Népszava Online	19 November 2012	PPKE: Since theology was not at the time in the national register of disciplines, the Hungarian Accreditation Commission recognized the program as religious studies.	20 November 2012
Possible procedural misconduct	The basis on which Semjén received his degree in theology is inadequate for the conversion to a PhD in religious studies.	Népszabadság	4 January 2013	Unresolved, as the PPKE is not conducting an investigation	n/a
Possible procedural misconduct	Semjén's theology dissertation did not contain original research and results, as required by the PhD regulations, and the majority of the sources he used (with, or without properly citing them) fall into the category of educational, instead of scientific literature.	Népszabadság	22 December 2012	Unresolved, as the PPKE is not conducting an investigation	n/a
Possible procedural misconduct	Semjén does not have any documented scientific achievements, as required by the PhD regulations.	Népszabadság	22 December 2012	Unresolved, as the PPKE is not conducting an investigation	n/a
Possible procedural misconduct	Semjén did not take and/or pass language examinations in two foreign languages, as required by the PhD regulations.	Népszabadság	22 December 2012	Unresolved, as the PPKE is not conducting an investigation	n/a

== Reactions ==
=== Zsolt Semjén ===
On 18 November Zsolt Semjén told Blikk, a Hungarian daily tabloid, that in his opinion the allegations are "completely absurd, the mere assumption is astounding".

At a press conference on 8 December, in response to the results of the investigation at ELTE, Semjén told the press that at that time he acted in good faith, and that he rejects all accusations questioning his ethics. He blamed his lecturers for not warning him that what he did was problematic, as he was acting in accordance with their intentions. He further stated that he considers the accusations to be "Black PR", an attempt at a politically motivated character assassination. At the end of his speech Semjén did not take questions from the press.

=== The Prime Minister's Office ===
On 19 November the Prime Minister's Office called the hvg.hu article a "ridiculous and pathetic political provocation", and made Semjén's laureatus thesis and sociology diploma thesis available on their website.

On 21 November the Prime Minister's Office made the following announcement:

Hvg.hu's campaign of slander has winded. Credible and competent personalities, regardless of political or scientific views, over the past few days, stood up for the honesty and the scientific achievements of Zsolt Semjén. We have fully disclosed in the relevant documents, by which, as a house of cards, the trumped-up charges led by hvg.hu collapsed. As this part of the left-wing media slandered Zsolt Semjén both in a human and scientific sense, the bare minimum that would be required is a public apology to the Deputy Prime Minister. A clear, audible "we apologize" will suffice. If they fail to do this, hvg.hu and the writers who join them are going to be ultimately sinking into the swamp of incredibility.

In response to the results of the investigation at ELTE, the Office of the Prime Minister issued the following statement on 7 December:

"Zsolt Semjén takes cognizance of the official statement of the ELTE committee, on the basis of which no action will be initiated regarding his thesis. Thus – together with ELTE – Zsolt Semjén considers the matter finally and formally closed."

=== Government politicians ===
On 19 November state secretary for education, Rózsa Hoffmann told ATV that in her opinion the accusations are false, and are a part of a political game.

On 19 November Christian Democrat politician István Pálffy said that it feels like a coordinated attack was launched against Catholics, and against Christianity in general, and cited the hvg.hu article as an example of such an attack. Bence Rétvári, also of KDNP, said that there is no question that Hungary is a Christian state, and that there is a persecution of Christians. In his opinion, the allegations of plagiarism are a part of that persecution of Christians.

On 11 December, commenting on the results of the ELTE investigation, KDNP representative György Rubovszky told atv.hu that he was "Shocked, hearing the news". In his opinion Semjén could not have plagiarized from Attila Molnár, as Semjén's dissertation was published a year before Molnár's article, "instead, he had a vision." He added: "ELTE simply made a clown of itself." He stressed that Molnar should have noticed the congruity between the two works when Semjén defended his thesis. "According to the copyright law, the one who publishes first has precedence, not the one who come up with it." He also said that "the whole thing is a terribly ugly, unsuccessful attack against the Deputy Prime Minister." He believed "the university attacked and offended Zsolt Semjén in an unjustified manner".

=== Pázmány Péter Catholic University ===
On 20 November, in response to the questions raised regarding the conversion of Semjén's laureatus degree in theology to a PhD degree in religious studies, Szabolcs Szuromi, rector of the Pázmány Péter Catholic University said that the conversion had been conducted in full accordance with the regulations of both Church and State.

On 30 November the rector's office at the Pázmány Péter Catholic University reaffirmed that the university was not going to investigate the allegations of academic misconduct regarding Semjén's 1991 laureatus dissertation, and considers the case closed.

=== Eötvös Loránd University ===
On 23 November Katalin Tausz, dean of the Faculty of Social Sciences at ELTE told Népszabadság that an investigation regarding Semjén's diploma dissertation is unjustified. She also told Népszabadság that Semjén finished his studies with better than average grades, and that according to the records the final exam was conducted according to the regulations at the time.

On 29 November in a press release Tausz announced that she is setting up a three-member committee, consisting of members of the Faculty of Social Sciences, to investigate the allegations that Semjén's sociology dissertation is partially identical to works by other authors.

At a press conference on 7 December Tausz presented the findings of the investigation. According to the committee, Zsolt Semjén has committed serious ethical, professional misconduct, but ELTE is not in the position to take official action.

Nevertheless, twelve lecturers at ELTE consider Semjén's thesis invalid until he and Molnár clarify the situation. On 11 December they wrote:

The professors of the Faculty of Social Sciences, ELTE make the following statement regarding Zsolt Semjén's thesis.

The significant amount of identical text in Zsolt Semjén's thesis and Attila Molnár's articles indicates a serious violation of the ethics of science. Whoever committed this violation – the defending student, the supervisor, or both – the case is damaging the moral foundations of scientific research and education. Such an offence has no term of limitation, and its moral assessment does not require special regulations. The allegation, as it disgraces thousands of dissertations made through honest work and the reputation of the Faculty.

The professors of the Faculty of Social Sciences at ELTE strongly condemn such behavior. We believe that the case can not be regarded as closed as long as the two participants do not publicly clarify the issue of responsibility. As long as this does not happen, the professors do not consider the thesis valid.

11 December 2012

György Csepeli, university professor; Zsuzsa Ferge, university professor; Nikosz Fokasz, university professor; Gábor Gyáni, university professor; Gábor Halmai, university professor; Tibor Huszár, university professor; Éva Orosz, university professor; Antal Örkény, university professor; Péter Pete, university professor; Tamás Rudas, university professor; Endre Sík, university professor; Péter Somlai, university professor; Mária Székelyi

On 19 December, in an announcement, the Eötvös Loránd University reaffirmed the findings of the committee (that parts of Semjén's sociology dissertation contain segments from Molnár's publications that were published later), and that the university is not taking formal action:

The leadership of the Eötvös Loránd University (ELTE) confirms its univocal commitment to fully implement the scientific and ethical standards of scientific practice in education and research. In the evaluation of the past and present actions of our former and current students and lecturers we adhere to the moral and professional standards and to the assurance of legal certainty.

About the overheated statements that appeared regarding the case of the diploma thesis of our former student, Zsolt Semjén, we call the attention of the parties concerned to the importance of accurate, legally verifiable and substantiated statements.

Documents since published have also confirmed two major findings of the investigation. First, there exists a significant overlap of identical texts between the diploma thesis and publications that have appeared after its submission. On the other hand, the University does not intend to commit an unlawful action by retroactively overriding the graduation process.

In accordance with the regulations, by establishing the correspondences between the texts of the diploma thesis and subsequent publications, we have closed the official proceedings.

— elte.hu, 19 December

=== HVG on the findings of the ELTE committee ===
In an article on 14 December hvg.hu calls the findings of the ELTE committee incomplete because it did not deal with or resolve the following issues:

- The question of Semjén earning a university degree with a thesis that is an abridged version of a dissertation he has already submitted and defended at another institution;
- The fact that Semjén's dissertation (the second, revised edition) not only contained sections from Molnár's writings that appeared after Semjén's graduation, but also from publications that have appeared before. These include works Semjén properly cited in his theology dissertation, but failed to reference in his sociology thesis, e.g. by Roman Catholic theologians István Előd and László Vanyó, and an unreferenced three pages long table from a publication by German Lutheran theologian Lothar Gassmann;
- The question weather the regulations in 1992 allowed for the rewriting and resubmitting of a thesis that had been given a failing grade by one of the reviewers, since in most Hungarian universities when there is significant disagreement between two reviewers, the third, additional reviewer who is brought into the process to resolve the issue, receives the same work for evaluation the original reviewers have assessed. Hvg.hu notes that this question could be answered would Semjén release the three reviews.

=== Gábor Jobbágyi ===
According to Gábor Jobbágyi, a lawyer and professor at Budapest's Pázmány Péter Catholic University, in the case of the ELTE dissertation plagiarism is out of the question, because Attila Károly Molnár's works were published later, and the dissertation is protected by copyright. Furthermore, Attila Károly Molnár was himself a member of the state examination board, and granted the dissertation the highest possible grade. He says that ELTE also acted erroneously in not sending a decision to those concerned after the examination.

=== Attila Molnár ===
Regarding the parts in Semjén's sociology diploma thesis that are largely identical to parts of Molnár's later publications, Molnár made the following comments on 29 November:

In contrast to the insinuation that appeared on 26 November in HVG, the reality is that the study published in the journal Valóság in 1993, is my own intellectual product. Not then, not ever have I taken texts or parts, with or without reference, from the works of students. Anyone who claims otherwise should produce the evidence, and should be ready to defend it before the independent Hungarian court.

The usual in university life, I have conducted joint research with my students, also in the field of sociology of religion, as in this case.

— Attila Molnár, 29 November

On 7 December, responding to the results of the ELTE investigation, Molnár wrote the following:

I still consider the first version of Zsolt Semjén's dissertation a good work, and the failing grade it received I consider biased. The organizers of the state examination did not consider it important to show me his revised (second) work for review. Anyone who says or implies otherwise, should be prepared to defend this allegation in court.

— Attila Molnár, 7 December

== Commentary on the contents of the dissertations ==
In the media, a section on Satanism and rock music in Semjén's theology dissertation draw special attention. In this section, Semjén talks about the music of the Rolling Stones, Black Sabbath, and Judas Priest, singling out the 1968 Rolling Stones song "Sympathy for the Devil" as an alarming example:

The "fashion-Satanism" is superficial, non-reflected, passing – although it would be a huge mistake and it would be irresponsible to say that it is harmless. These "ideas" are confused and meaningless. They came to be consumable simplified to text, on the waves of fashion. Their distributors, distillers, are various types of rock [music]. (This of course applies to the negative side of New Age, the musical features of the positive side are the Asian meditative music and nature-music.)

But it would be unfair to brand rock music as a whole as destructive. The occultistic features do not necessarily represent identification, sometimes it is just for creating atmosphere. For example in the case of Led Zeppelin, where this is just an experiment in myth creation, show business. I believe that where this is "only" a show, we should not speak of the devil.
There are, unfortunately, many cases where no speaking is necessary. A sad example of this is the infamous Rolling Stones. (Though not in every aspect and not in every era.) Their concerts promise an "apocalyptic" experience. The singer, Mick Jagger, as a "sex phenomenon" (at least according to the fans) tries to set hysteria loose (not without success.) The whole phenomenon is quite alarming that – in terms of their lyrics – is also expressing [sic!]. A pregnant expression of this mentality is the title of one of their number one hit songs: Sympathy for the Devil.
[...]

Pregnant representatives of occult rock are Black Sabbath and Judas Priest.

— Semjén, Zsolt, "The challenge of New Age and opportunity for evangelization", laureatus dissertation, 1991, pp. 77–80
