= Nikolett Árvay =

Hungarian politician

Member of the National Assembly
- Incumbent
- Assumed office 9 May 2026
- Preceded by: Judit Czunyi-Bertalan
- Constituency: Komárom-Esztergom 3rd

Personal details
- Party: TISZA

Nikolett Árvay is a Hungarian politician who was elected member of the National Assembly in 2026. She works as a lawyer.
