= Bokod =

Bokod may refer to the following places:

- Bokod, Benguet, Philippines
- Bokod, Hungary
