= Judit Czunyi-Bertalan =

Hungarian politician

Judit Czunyiné Bertalan
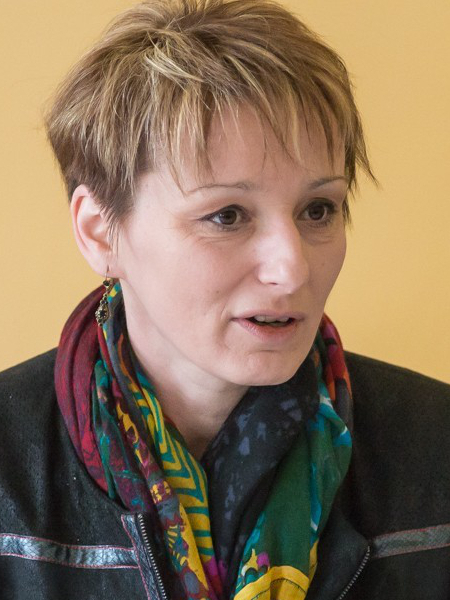

Secretary of State for Public Education
- In office 15 June 2014 – 14 February 2016
- Minister: Zoltán Balog
- Preceded by: Rózsa Hoffmann
- Succeeded by: László Palkovics (Education)

Member of the National Assembly
- In office 14 May 2010 – 8 May 2026

Personal details
- Born: 6 August 1974 (age 51) Bokod, Hungary
- Party: Fidesz
- Spouse: Gábor Czunyi
- Children: 2
- Profession: Politician

Judit Czunyiné Bertalan (born 6 August 1974) is a Hungarian politician, member of the National Assembly (MP) for Kisbér then Komárom (Komárom-Esztergom County Constituency III) since 2014. She was a member of the Committee on Youth, Social, Family, and Housing affairs from 14 May 2010 to 14 February 2011.

She was appointed Director of the Komárom-Esztergom County Government Office on 1 January 2011. She became Secretary of State for Education on 15 June 2014, replacing Rózsa Hoffmann. She lives in Bokod with her husband and two children.

Following several rallies and protests against the Orbán cabinet's education reforms in February 2016, when teachers and students criticized the centralized structure and demanded a free choice of textbooks and reduction in teaching hours, Czunyiné Bertalan was dismissed as state secretary by Minister of Human Resources Zoltán Balog. At the same, she was appointed Government Commissioner for the Digital Content Development.

After the 2018 parliamentary election, she became a vice-chairperson of the Justice Committee. Following the 2022 parliamentary election, Minister Tibor Navracsics appointed her government commissioner responsible for the economic development of Western Transdanubia in May 2022.

== Personal life ==
She is married to Gábor Czunyi. They have two sons, Gábor and Gergő.
