= Batthyány Society of Professors =

Hungarian conservative university professors association

Batthyány Society of Professors Professzorok Batthyány Köre
- Abbreviation: PBK
- Formation: June 3, 1995; 29 years ago
- Type: independent association (NGO), with support from the Batthyány Foundation
- Purpose: "to provide a framework for the activity of university professors who are strongly committed to traditional European social virtues and are willing to act for a better society"
- Headquarters: Budapest, Hungary
- Region served: Hungary
- President: Rezső Lovas
- Affiliations: Batthyány Foundation
- Website: www.bla.hu/profs

The Batthyány Society of Professors (Hungarian: Professzorok Batthyány Köre) is a Hungarian association of conservative university professors founded in 1995 as a non-governmental organization. Members are committed to what they call "traditional European social virtues" and they aim to "give intellectual stimulation to the Hungarian nation thereby contributing to its spiritual and economic development". The society supports political parties and politicians who "work for a 'civic' Hungary".

The Society is affiliated with the Lajos Batthyány Foundation, an association aiming at the promotion of a "Hungarian political mentality committed to the Hungarian people and nation, focussing on European unity and resting on common Christian values and a democratic parliamentary governing".

== Renowned members ==
As of March 2012 the Society has 213 members. Some of the more renowned are:

- Attila Borhidi- Biologist
- Tamás Freund - Neurobiologist
- Balázs Gulyás- Neurobiologist
- József Hámori - Politician and Biologist
- Zsolt Liposits - Neuroendocrinologist
- András Prékopa - Mathematician
- György Szabad - Politician and Historian
- Eörs Szathmáry - Biologist
- Tivadar Tulassay - Physician
- Tar Pál- businessman and diplomat pediatrician, Rector of the Semmelweis University between 2003 and 2012
