= Tivadar Tulassay =

Hungarian pediatrician (born 1949)

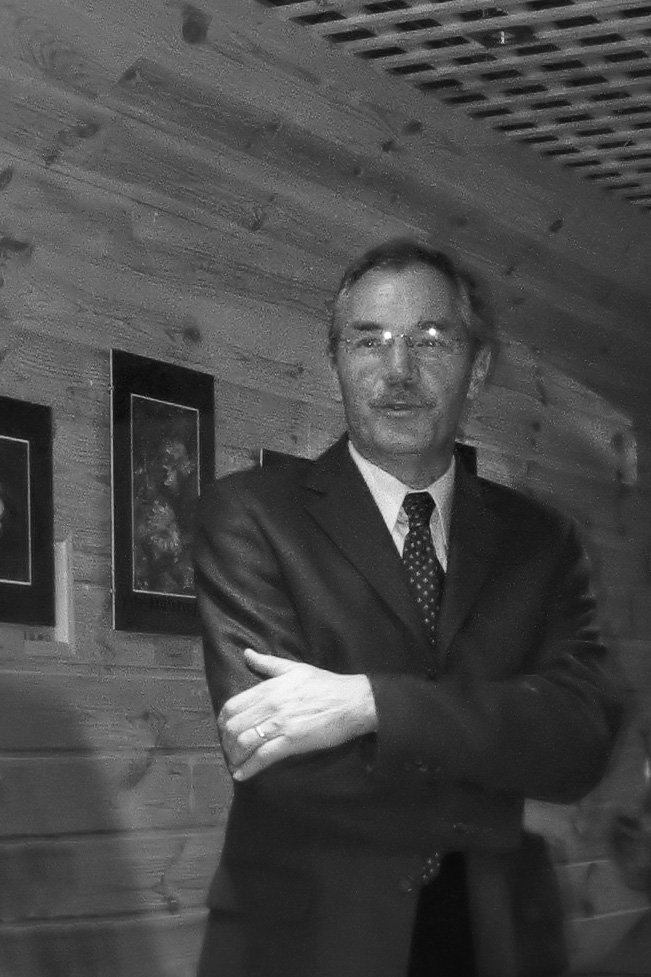
- Born: 18 January 1949 (age 77); Galanta, Czechoslovakia
- Education: Semmelweis University
- Occupations: physician, academic
- Title: Prof. Dr.

Tivadar Tulassay (born 18 January 1949) is a Hungarian pediatrician, who served as Rector of the Semmelweis University between 2003 and 2012. He is a member of the Hungarian Academy of Sciences (2007) and the European Academy of Sciences and Arts since 2012. He also member of the conservative Batthyány Society of Professors.

== Main publications ==
- Koraszülöttek patológiás veseműködése (PhD thesis, 1983)
- Atrial Natriuretic Peptide in Plasma of Volume-Overloaded Children with Chronic Renal Failure (co-author, 1985)
- Hormonal Regulation of Water Metabolism in Children with Nephrotic Syndrome (co-author, 1987)
- A pitvari nátriuretikus peptid és egyéb vazoaktív hormonok szabályozó szerepe a folyadék- és elektrolitháztartásban (academic doctoral thesis, 1989)
- Renal Vascular Disease in the Newborn (co-author, 1998)
- Renal Insufficiency and Acute Renal Failure (co-author, 1998)
- Magas vérnyomás csecsemő és gyermekkorban (1999)
- Humán gyomornyálkahártya savtermelő képességének közvetlem meghatározása gasztroszkópia során vett biopsziás mintákból (co-author, 2000)
- Kis születési súlyú fiatal felnőttek mellékvesehormonjainak vizsgálata és ezek összefüggése a szénhidrát-anyagcsere és a cardiovascularis rendszer egyes paramétereivel (co-author, 2000)
- Variance of ACE and ATI Receptor Gene does not Influence the Rist Neonatal Acute Renal Failure (co-author, 2001)
- Gender-specific association of vitamin D receptor polymorphism combinations with type 1 diabetes mellitus (co-author, 2002)
- Sex differences in the alterations of Na+,K+-ATPase following ischaemia-reperfusion injury in the rat kidney (co-author, 2004)
- Increased mucosal expression of Toll-like receptor (TLR)2 and TLR4 in coeliac disease (co-author, 2007)

Academic offices
Preceded by Péter Sótonyi	Rector of the Semmelweis University; 2003–2012	Succeeded by Ágoston Szél
