= Zsolt Liposits =

Hungarian neuroscientist

- Liposits Zsolt
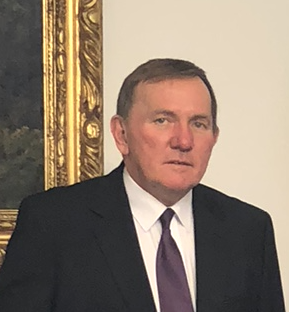
- Born: October 22, 1951 (age 70); Pécs, Hungary
- Education: PhD,1987, Hungarian Academy of Sciences; DSc, 1992, Hungarian Academy of Sciences
- Known for: Neurobiology of reproduction, stress/adaptation and metabolism. Hypothalamic neurosecretory systems. Mechanisms of estrogen signaling
- Spouse: Anna Mária Dobó
- Children: Balázs Liposits Réka Liposits
- Scientific career
- Fields: Neuroscience; Neuroendocrinology

Zsolt Liposits (born 22 October 1951) is a Hungarian physician, neuroscientist and university professor.

== Career ==
In 1976, he received MD degree from University Medical School Pécs and was appointed Lecturer in Anatomy.

He was invited by Albert Szent-Györgyi Medical University and was appointed chairman of the Department of Anatomy, Histology and Embryology, Szeged, Hungary in 1993.

In 1998, he joined the Institute of Experimental Medicine of the Hungarian Academy of Sciences in Budapest and established the Department of Endocrine Neurobiology.

He was appointed Professor at Pázmány Péter Catholic University, Faculty of Information Technology and Bionics in 2002.

He has also worked as visiting scientist at the University of Missouri-Columbia, Columbia, MO, USA, the National Institute of Environmental Heath Sciences, (NIEHS), Research Triangle Park, NC, USA and Nagoya, City University, Nagoya, Japan.

From 2008 until 2017, he was Head of the Hungarian Section of the International Neuroendocrine Federation (INF).

== Scientific achievements ==
He has been studying cellular and molecular mechanisms whereby the hypothalamus regulates centrally the physiological events of reproduction, stress and metabolism.

He elaborated immune electron microscopic techniques for studying the synaptic regulation of hypothalamic neurosecretory systems and elucidated molecular mechanisms of estrogen signalling via nuclear receptors in the brain.

For more information about his current research team, please, visit the webpage of Laboratory of Endocrine Neurobiology.

His scientific publications are over 180, Hirsch-index is 61. Till date, his scientific results received more than 11 000 citations.

== Scientific publications ==
His scientific papers are listed in various data bases.

== Honours and awards ==
- 2010 Pázmány Plaquette
- 2008 Academy Award
- 2005 Charles Simonyi Research Award
- 1997 Széchenyi Professorship
