= Ferenc Gyurcsány plagiarism controversy =

The Ferenc Gyurcsány plagiarism controversy refers to the allegations of plagiarism concerning the 1984 college thesis of Ferenc Gyurcsány, Prime Minister of Hungary between 2004 and 2009, that broke in spring 2012, after the resignation of President Pál Schmitt as the result of the Pál Schmitt academic misconduct controversy.

Gyurcsány graduated from the Teacher's Training Faculty of the Janus Pannonius University, now University of Pécs, in 1984, as an elementary school teacher of biology and technology, with a 35-page college thesis entitled "A Balaton-felvidék szőlészete és borászata" (The viticulture and oenology of the Balaton-highlands).

In an article published on 2 April 2012, Pécsi Újság called into question whether Gyurcsány submitted a diploma thesis at all. István Geresdi, Dean of the Faculty of Sciences at the University of Pécs told Pécsi Újság that they were unable to find Gyurcsány's diploma thesis. He further added that Gyurcsány's thesis was the only missing work from that time period.

On 3 April, Gyurcsány published a page from his course record book that stated that he submitted and defended a college thesis. He also stated that he did not know where his own copy of his thesis was, but he would make efforts to locate and publish it. After two weeks, on 13 April he announced that he failed to find his copy of the thesis.

On 27 April, Hír TV, a government-leaning television channel (owned by members of the Fidesz party, that of which the aforementioned president, Pál Schmitt, resigned), announced that they have found evidence that Szabolcs Rozs, who was Gyurcsány's brother-in-law in 1984, submitted a college thesis at the same college and department as Gyurcsány, with a title identical to Gyurcsány's work, in 1980.

Three days later, on 30 April Hír Tv announced that they have located and compared the reviews of both works, and found that based on the common errors and omissions, Gyurcsány's thesis is likely to be identical to the first half of Rozs's, supporting the allegations of plagiarism. The original works, however, were not compared. Hir TV has, as of 4 May 2012, not made any of the materials cited available to other media outlets for analysis.

Gyurcsány has filed a criminal complaint for the apparent theft of his thesis from the university, believed now to have occurred sometime during the coverage of the Pál Schmitt controversy in the media.
