= Heti Világgazdaság =

Hungarian weekly magazine

- Categories: Business magazine
- Frequency: Weekly
- Circulation: 19,000 (2025)
- Founded: 1979; 47 years ago
- Company: HVG Kiadó Zrt.
- Country: Hungary
- Based in: Budapest
- Language: Hungarian and English
- Website: hvg.hu
- ISSN: 1217-9647

HVG (formerly called Heti Világgazdaság; Hungarian pronunciation: [ˈhɛti ˈvilaːɡːɒzdɒʃaːɡ], lit. 'Weekly World Economy') has been Hungary’s leading economic and political weekly both in terms of circulation and readership since it was founded in 1979. It is closely modeled on The Economist in style and content.

As a regular source of news and information, HVG has a significant influence on business decision makers and other stakeholder groups. Its editorial office is in Budapest. HVG provides information about domestic and international politics, economy and society.

HVG has an online news portal, which is available on all platforms: mobile, tablet, android and iOS applications. With its news and analyses, HVG reaches more than 1.5 million people every week on its various print and digital platforms.

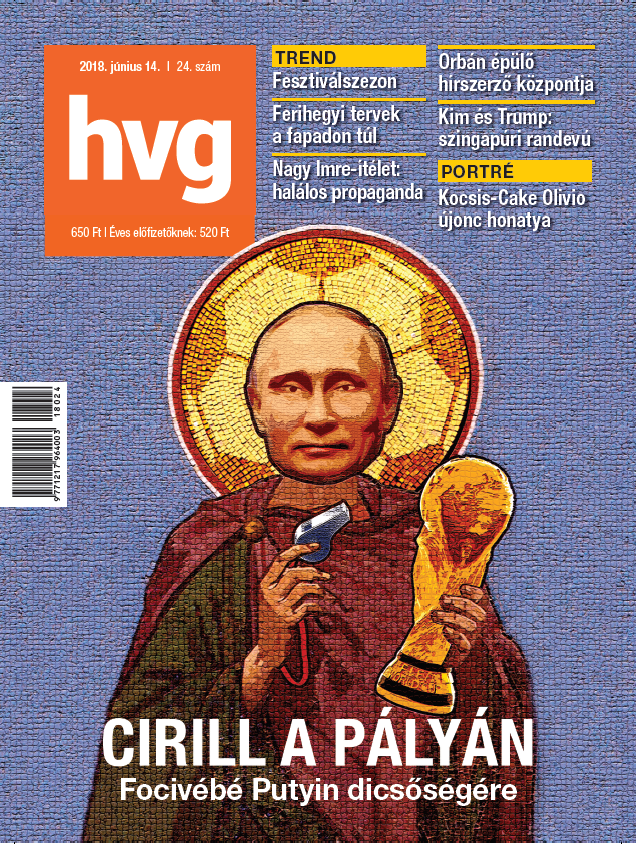
HVG weekly cover page 2018/33

== History and profile ==
The magazine was important in the years spanning the transition from communism in airing new ideas and challenging boundaries. During the same period, it was also a leading investigative publication. HVG Publishing Co. was founded in 1989. In 2003, Westdeutsche Allgemeine Zeitung (WAZ) acquired 75% of the magazine. In 2014 WAZ (Funke) redeemed its majority stake, which was bought back by former HVG shareholder, management and editorial staff, and HVG was again in Hungarian hands.

== HVG cover pages ==
HVG's cover pages always work on one of the main themes of the week, mostly depicting ironic humor. In the 80's, headlines were mostly not photos, but graphics featuring suggestive hints. These covers intended to affect the sense of humor of readers sensitive to the criticism of the ruling political system. After the change of regime, cover pages became partly more concrete, and partly continued the earlier tradition.

== See also ==
- List of magazines in Hungary
