= Rózsa Hoffmann =

Hungarian politician

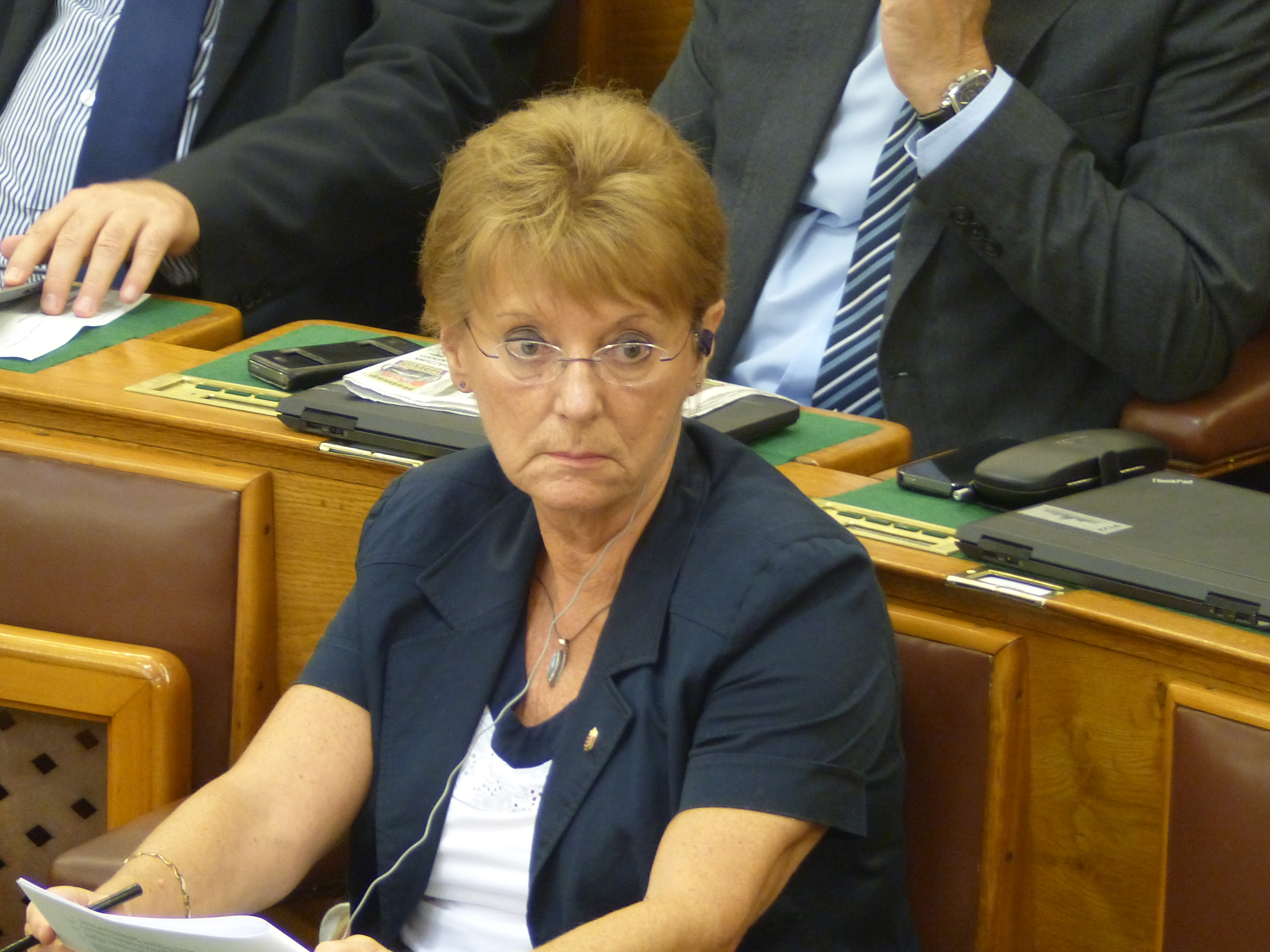

Secretary of State for Public Education
- In office 28 February 2013 – 5 June 2014
- Minister: Zoltán Balog
- Preceded by: herself (Education)
- Succeeded by: Judit Czunyi-Bertalan

Secretary of State for Education
- In office 2 June 2010 – 27 February 2013
- Minister: Miklós Réthelyi; Zoltán Balog
- Preceded by: Gergely Arató
- Succeeded by: István Klinghammer (Higher Education) herself (Public Education)

Member of the National Assembly
- In office 16 May 2006 – 7 May 2018

Personal details
- Born: 22 January 1948 (age 77); Balatonfüred, Hungary
- Political party: MSZMP, Fidesz, KDNP
- Profession: politician, educator

Dr. Rózsa Hoffmann (born 22 January 1948) is a Hungarian politician and educator, Secretary of State for Education of the Ministry of National Resources from 2 June 2010 to 27 February 2013. She was appointed Secretary of State for Public Education on 28 February 2013, holding the office until June 2014.

== Career ==
She finished Kossuth Zsuzsa Grammar School in Budapest in 1966. She graduated as a French-Russian secondary school teacher from the Eötvös Loránd University (ELTE) in 1971. She received a dr.univ. degree in pedagogy from ELTE in 1985, which was converted to a PhD degree in 1996. She was a member of the ruling communist party of Hungary (MSZMP).

She worked as chief official for the Ministry of Cultural from 1972 to 1981, as deputy headmistress for Kaffka Margit Grammar School from 1981 to 1986, as headmistress for Németh László Grammar School from 1986 to 1997, for National Public Education and Estimate Exam Centre (OKÉV). She works as assistant professor and as head of institute for Faculty of Humanities of Péter Pázmány Catholic University from 1995. She is a general editor.

She was awarded several prizes: "Eminent Pedagogue" (1992), Apáczai-Csere János Prize (1995), "For Budapest" Prize (1996), Trefort Ágoston Prize and Széchenyi Scholarship (2001).

She tended several positions in the public life: National General Popular Education Council, National School-leaving Examination Board, Independent Teachers Forum, Teacher's Training Subcommittee of Hungarian Academy of Sciences, Németh László Association.

She joined Fidesz Hungarian Civic Party on 10 May 2003. She is a member of national presidium in the Cultural Branch, head of the Pedagogy Section.

In the 2006 parliamentary elections she obtained a mandate from national list. From 30 May 2006 she was a member of the Committee on Education and Science. In the next elections se won a seat from Győr-Moson-Sopron County regional list. Hoffmann was appointed Secretary of State for Education on 2 June 2010.

=== New education draft ===
In August 2010 she announced the government will take on a greater share of the funding of public education. Local governments will have to fund only 10-15% of schools' operating costs in the future, instead of the current 50%, and the central government will finance the rest, she also said. In other changes, she envisaged a career-for-life model for teachers and a professional supervisory and supporting system. Hoffmann said a review of the Bologna system has been launched and "where professional demand justifies this" Hungary will return to a unified and undivided system.
