= Bokod, Hungary =

Bokod
- Coat of arms

- Location of Komárom-Esztergom county in Hungary

- Location of Bokod, Hungary
- Coordinates: 47.49261°N 18.24814°E
- Country: Hungary
- County: Komárom-Esztergom

Area
  - Total: 29.92 km^{2} (11.55 sq mi)

Population (2004)
  - Total: 2,276
  - Density: 76.06/km^{2} (197.0/sq mi)
- Time zone: UTC+1 (CET)
  - Summer (DST): UTC+2 (CEST)
- Postal code: 2855
- Area code: 34

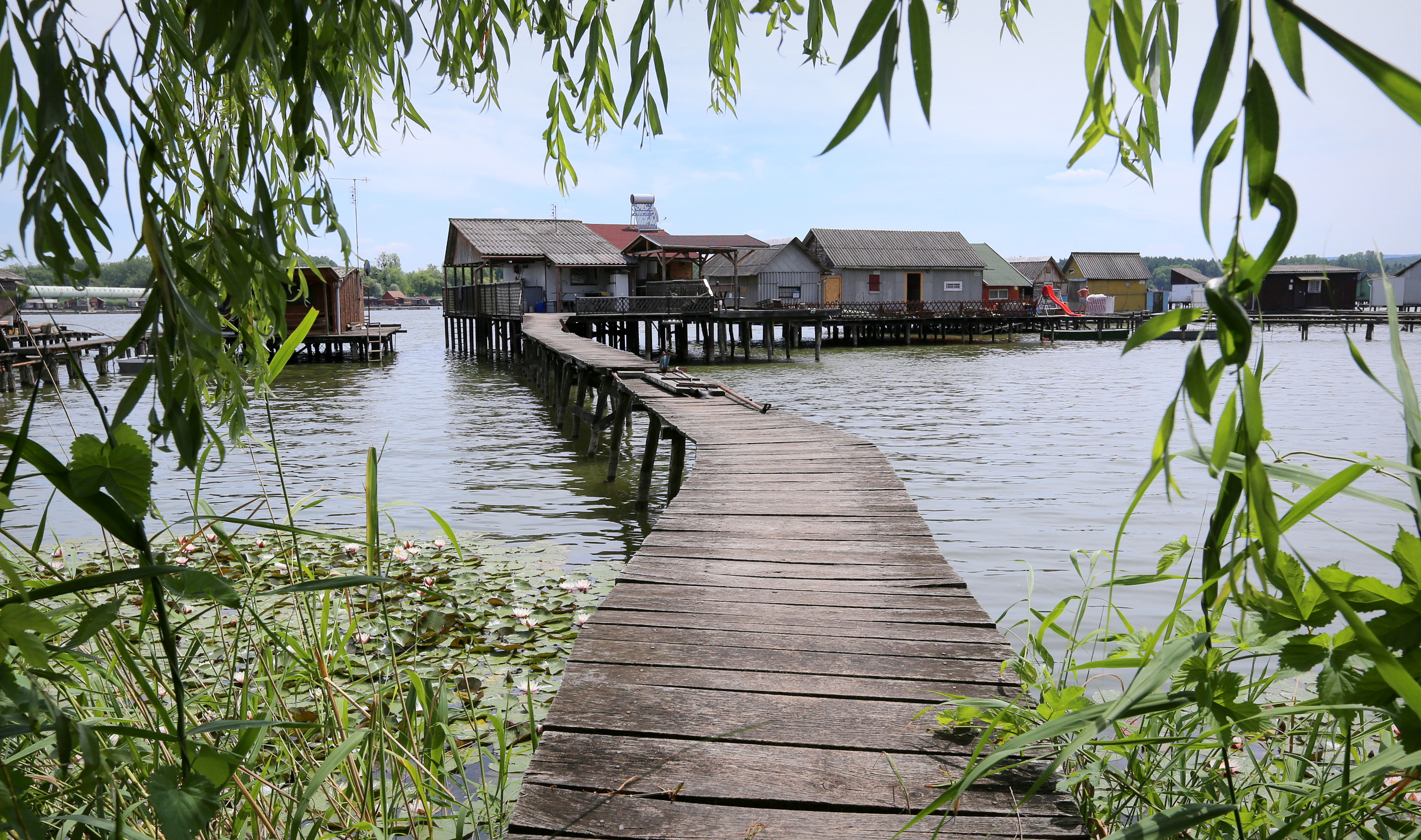

Bokod is a village in Komárom-Esztergom county, in Hungary.
