= Szalay =

Szalay is a surname. Notable people with the surname include:

- Antal Szalay (1912–1960), Hungarian footballer
- David Szalay (born 1974), Hungarian-British writer
- László Szalay de Kéménd (1813–1864), Hungarian statesman and historian
- Pál Szalay or Pál Szalai (1915–1994), anglicized as Paul Sterling, a high-ranking member of the Budapest police office
- Rachel Szalay, Australian actress and artist
- Sándor Szalay (physicist) (1909–1987), pioneer of Hungarian nuclear physics
- Sándor Szalay (figure skater) (1893–1965), Hungarian pair skater
- Szabolcs Szalay (born 2002), Hungarian professional football player
- Szandra Szalay (born 1989), Hungarian triathlete
- Thatcher Szalay (born 1979), American football player of Hungarian origin

== See also ==
- Szalai
- Szalay Goreny or Furmint, a variety of wine grape from the Pontian Balcanica branch of Vitis vinifera
- Salaj (surname)
