= Bánhida =

Coordinates: 47°34′16″N 18°23′10″E

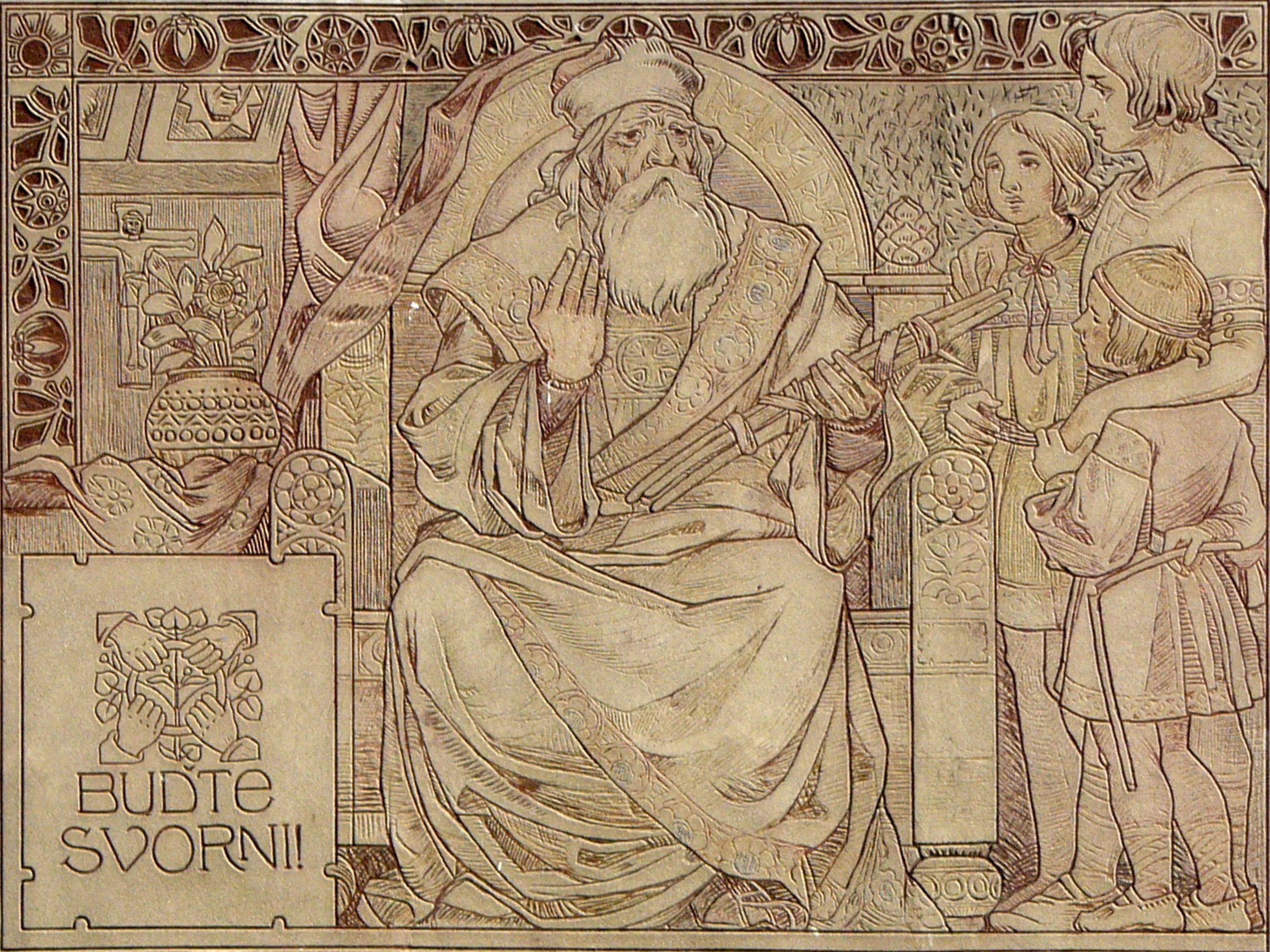
Szvatopluk

Bánhida (in German: Weinhild) is the oldest quarter of the city of Tatabánya in north-western Hungary. Inhabited since ancient times, excavations in this area have uncovered finds from the Bronze Age and the Roman era. It is hypothesized that the name derives from a former landowner named Bán who owned a bridge across the Rákos River (now called Által-ér).

== Bánhida in the middle age ==
By chronicle of Anonymus: Árpád, the second Grand Prince of the Magyars, destroyed the army of Szvatopluk here. The legend was immortalized by Árpád Feszty in a huge painting on the thousandth anniversary of the event. The largest bird statue of Central Europe, the Turul monument, was also erected in honor of the millennium. The work of Gyula Donáth, which stands on Stone-Hill, above the city, refers to the totem animal of our ancestors.

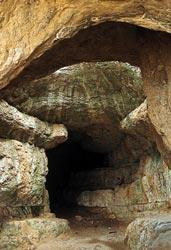
Szelim cave

In the diplomas the name of village is mentioned first in 1288. In the later diplomas the village is in the service of castles Vitány and Tata. In the medieval diplomas, two villages are consistently mentioned: Bánhyda maior and Bánhyda minor. The name of Mészáros (butcher) street refers to the ancient transportation road of our successful export item, beef. In the 16th century the Ottomans occupied the area (v. tale of Szelim cave).

Around this time the inhabitants became Protestants. Later, (in the 18th century) its feudal lords, the Esterházys populated the area with Roman Catholic Slovak settlers.

== Opening of the mines, the loss of the independence ==
The opening of the mines at the end of the 19th century caused significant changes in the character and life of the village.

During the industrialization wave which took over the country after World War II several Hungarian towns were developed into large industrial cities. The four villages (Tatabánya, Alsógalla, Felsőgalla, Bánhida) were united on October 1, 1947, under the name Tatabánya, and it was elevated to town status.

== Gallery ==
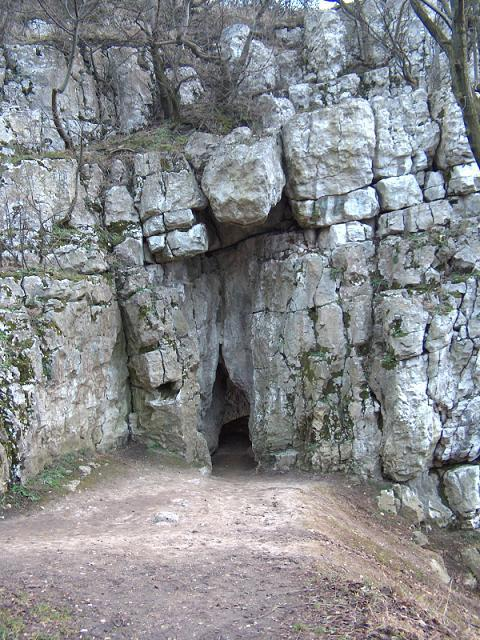
Szelim cave

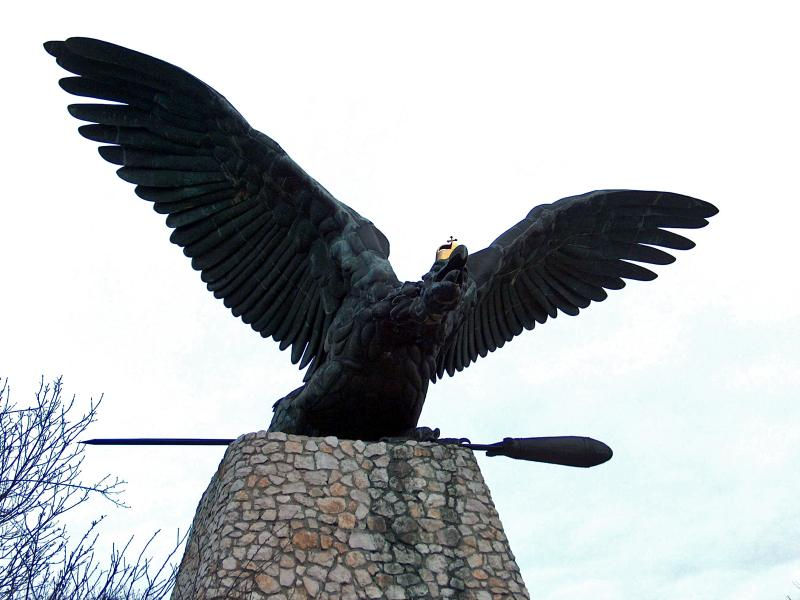
Turul

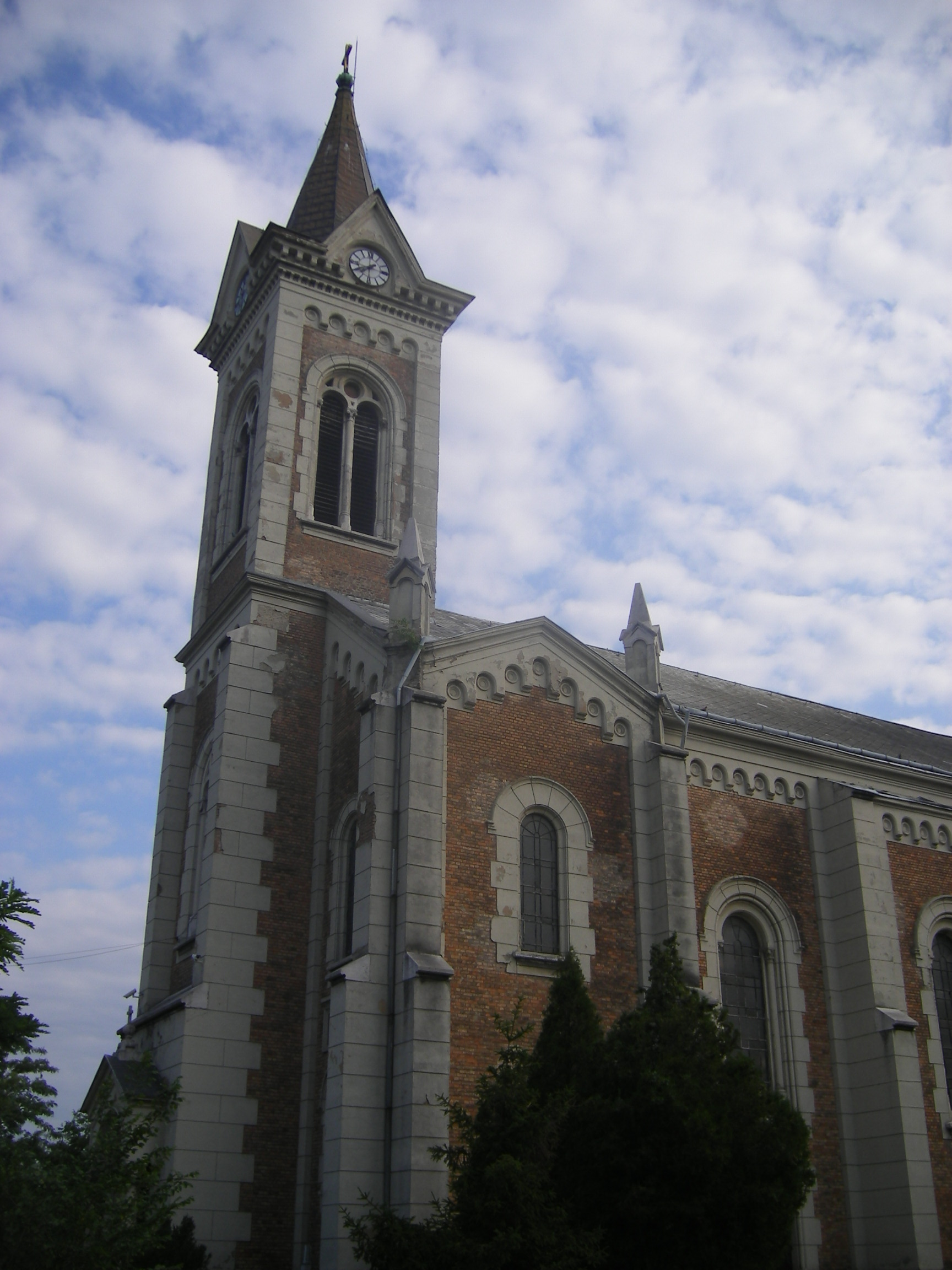
Roman Catholic Church – St. Michael

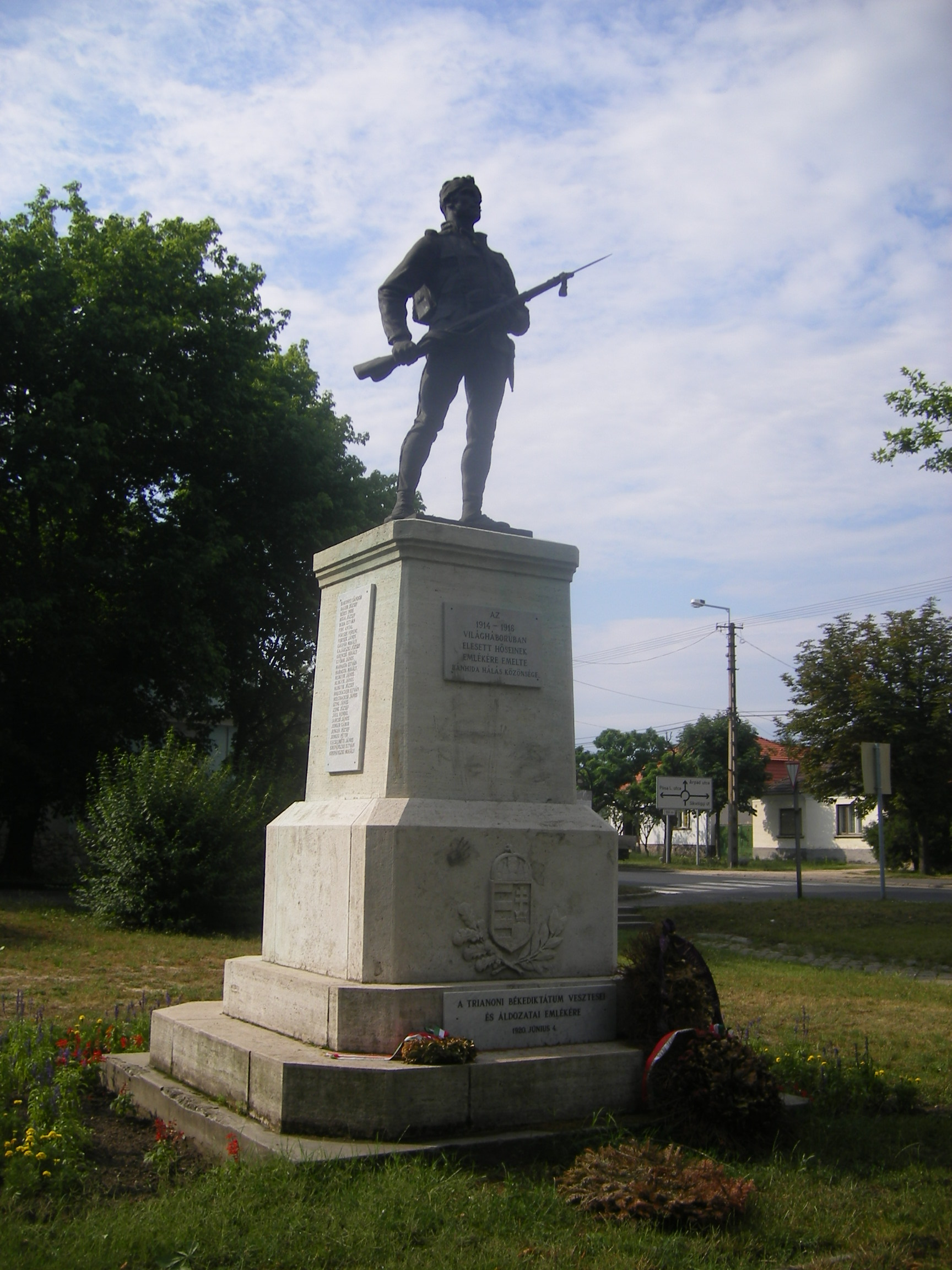
First World War monument

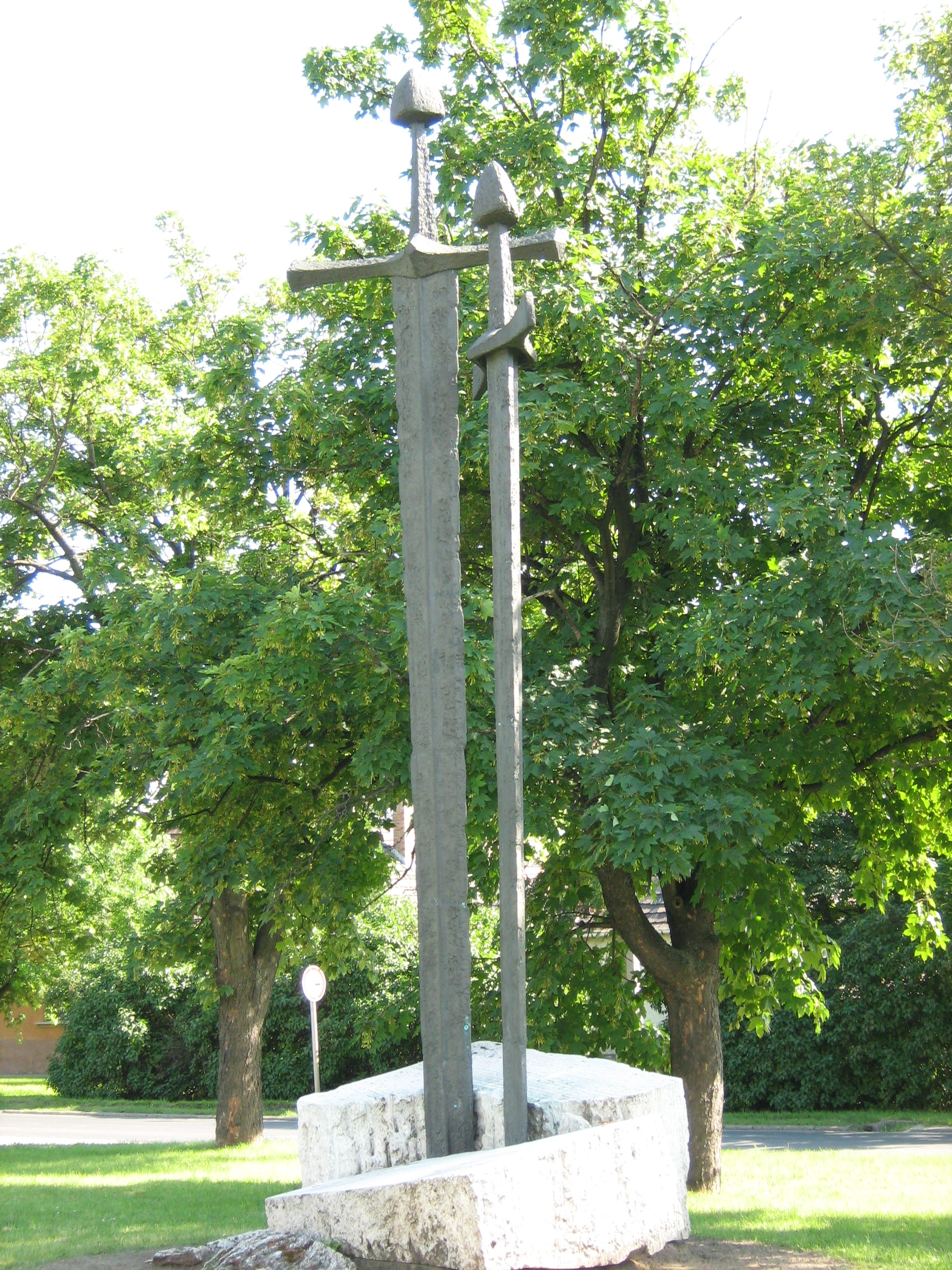
Second World War monument

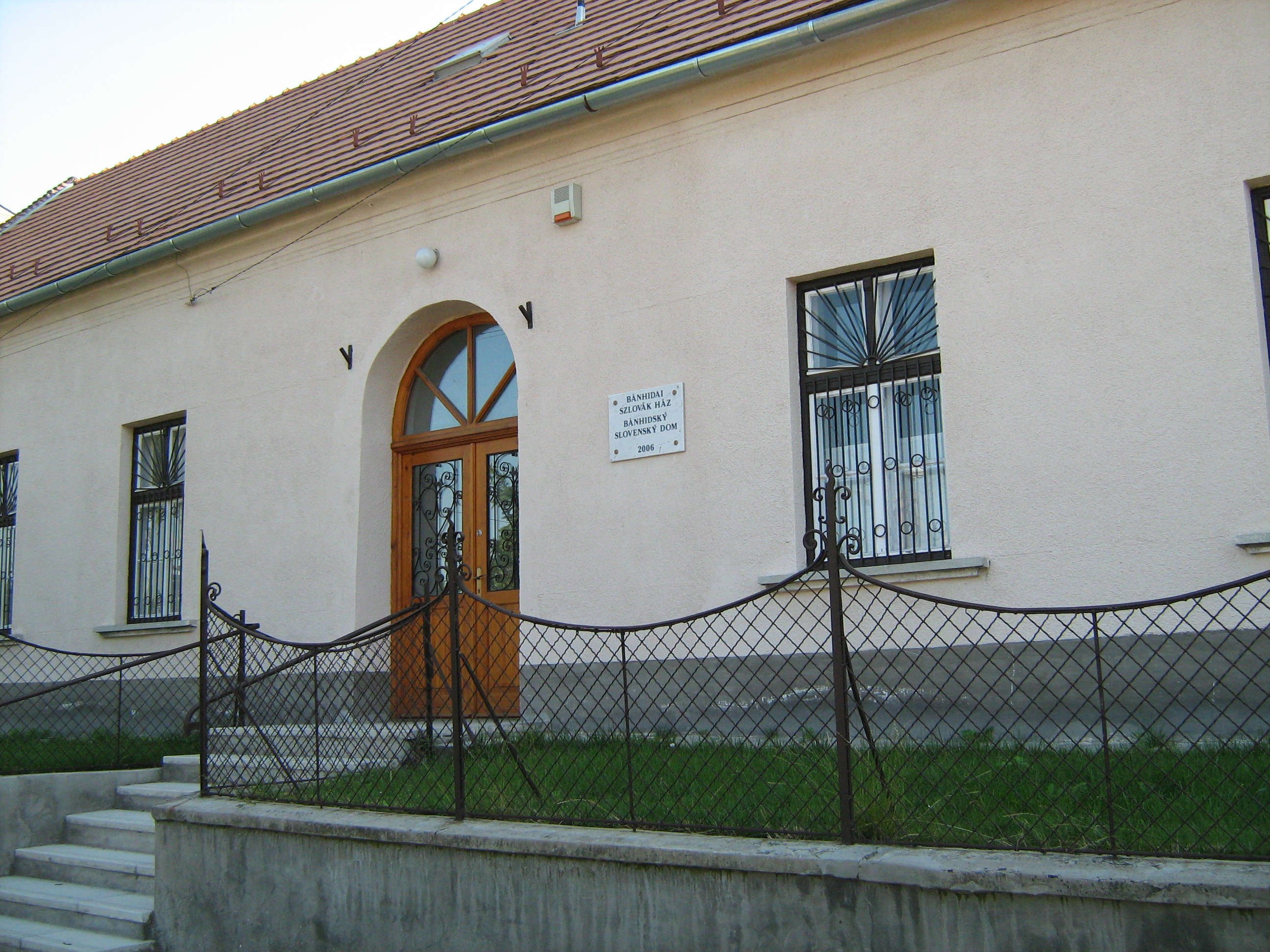
Bánhidian Slovak house
