= Szalai =

Szalai is a surname. Notable people with the surname include:

- Ádám Szalai (born 1987), Hungarian football player
- András Szalai (born 1998), Hungarian football player
- Annamária Szalai (1961–2013), Hungarian journalist and politician
- Antal Szalai (born 1981), Hungarian violinist
- Attila Szalai (born 1998), Hungarian football player
- Dániel Szalai (born 1996), Hungarian football player
- Gábor Szalai (born 2000), Hungarian footballer
- Jennifer Szalai, nonfiction book critic at The New York Times
- Kévin Szalaï (born 1992), French motorcycle racer
- Kenneth J. Szalai (born 1943), American aerospace engineer and former director of NASA Dryden Flight Research Center
- Pál Szalai (1915–1994), high-ranking member of the Budapest police force and the Hungarian Arrow Cross Party during World War II
- Peter Szalai (born 1962), Hungarian tabla player
- Silvia Szalai (born 1975), Hungarian-born German swimmer
- Tamás Szalai (born 1980), Hungarian football player
- Tamás Szalai (born 1984), Hungarian football player
- Vilmos Szalai (born 1991), Hungarian football player

== See also ==
- Furmint, a variety of wine grape
- Szalay
