= Tatabánya =

- City with county rights
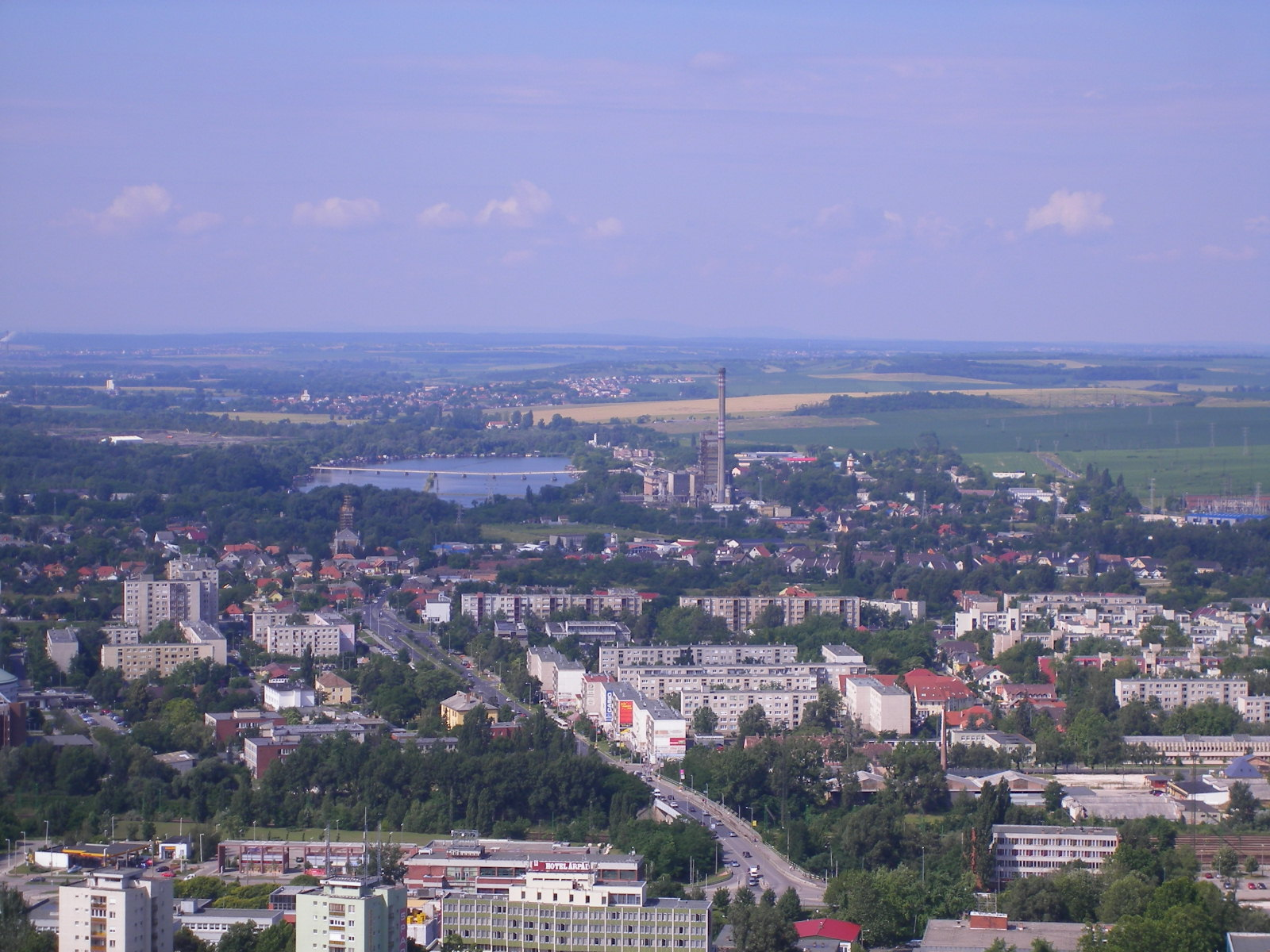
- Tatabánya in June 2008

- Flag Coat of arms

- Location within Komárom-Esztergom County Location within Hungary
- Coordinates: 47.58616°N 18.39485°E
- Country: Hungary
- Region: Central Transdanubia
- County: Komárom-Esztergom
- District: Tatabánya

Government
  - Mayor: Ilona Szűcsné Posztovics (Independent)
  - Town Notary: Dr. Gergely Berkovics

Area
  - Total: 91.42 km^{2} (35.30 sq mi)
- Elevation: 167 m (548 ft)

Population (2022)
  - Total: 64,305
  - Rank: 12th
- Postal code: 2800
- Area code: 34
- Motorways: M1
- Distance from Budapest: 60.1 km (37.3 mi) East
- Website: tatabanya.hu

Tatabánya (Hungarian: [ˈtɒtɒbaːɲɒ]; German: Totiserkolonie; Slovak: Banská Stará) is a city with county rights of 64,305 inhabitants in northwestern Hungary, in the Central Transdanubian region. It is the capital of Komárom-Esztergom County.

== Location ==
The city is located in the valley between the Gerecse and Vértes Hills, some 55 km (34 mi) from the capital. By virtue of its location, the city is a railway and road junction. The M1 (also European routes E60, E75) motorway from Vienna to Budapest passes through the outer city limits, and the Vienna-Budapest railway line also passes through the city.

== History ==
Largest groups of foreign residents
Nationality	Population (2011)
Germany	1,749
Slovakia	263
Poland	58
Greece	51
Russia	46

Archaeological findings prove that humans have been living here since the Stone Age. The three historic predecessor settlements of Tatabánya are Alsógalla, Felsőgalla, and Bánhida. Bánhida is the earliest settlement, it was first mentioned in 1288.

In the 16th century, the Ottoman Turks occupied the area. Around this time, the inhabitants became Protestants. Later, its feudal lords, the Esterházys populated the area with Roman Catholic German and Slovak settlers.

According to the 1787 census, Alsógalla had 580 and Felsőgalla had 842 inhabitants. The coal resources of the area were discovered around this time. The population began to grow, and a new mining colony was formed, later developing into the village of Tatabánya.

During the industrialization wave that took over the country after World War II, several Hungarian towns developed into large industrial cities. The four villages were united on October 1, 1947, under the name Tatabánya and it was elevated to town status. In 1950, it became the county capital of Komárom-Esztergom county (then called Komárom county.) By the 1980s, it had more than 80,000 inhabitants.

The industrial character of the city was significant until the fall of the Socialist government and the following political changes of 1989. After that, the importance of heavy industry and mining decreased and the economic structure of the city has changed remarkably.

== Archaeology ==
In April 2025, researchers from the Hungarian National Museum identified a previously unknown Avar-era cemetery estimated to contain up to 1,000 graves through aerial photographs revealing rectangular discolorations in a grain field. Subsequent excavations confirmed the presence of two log coffin tombs characteristic of Avar burial traditions dating from the 6th to 9th centuries AD.

== Infrastructure ==
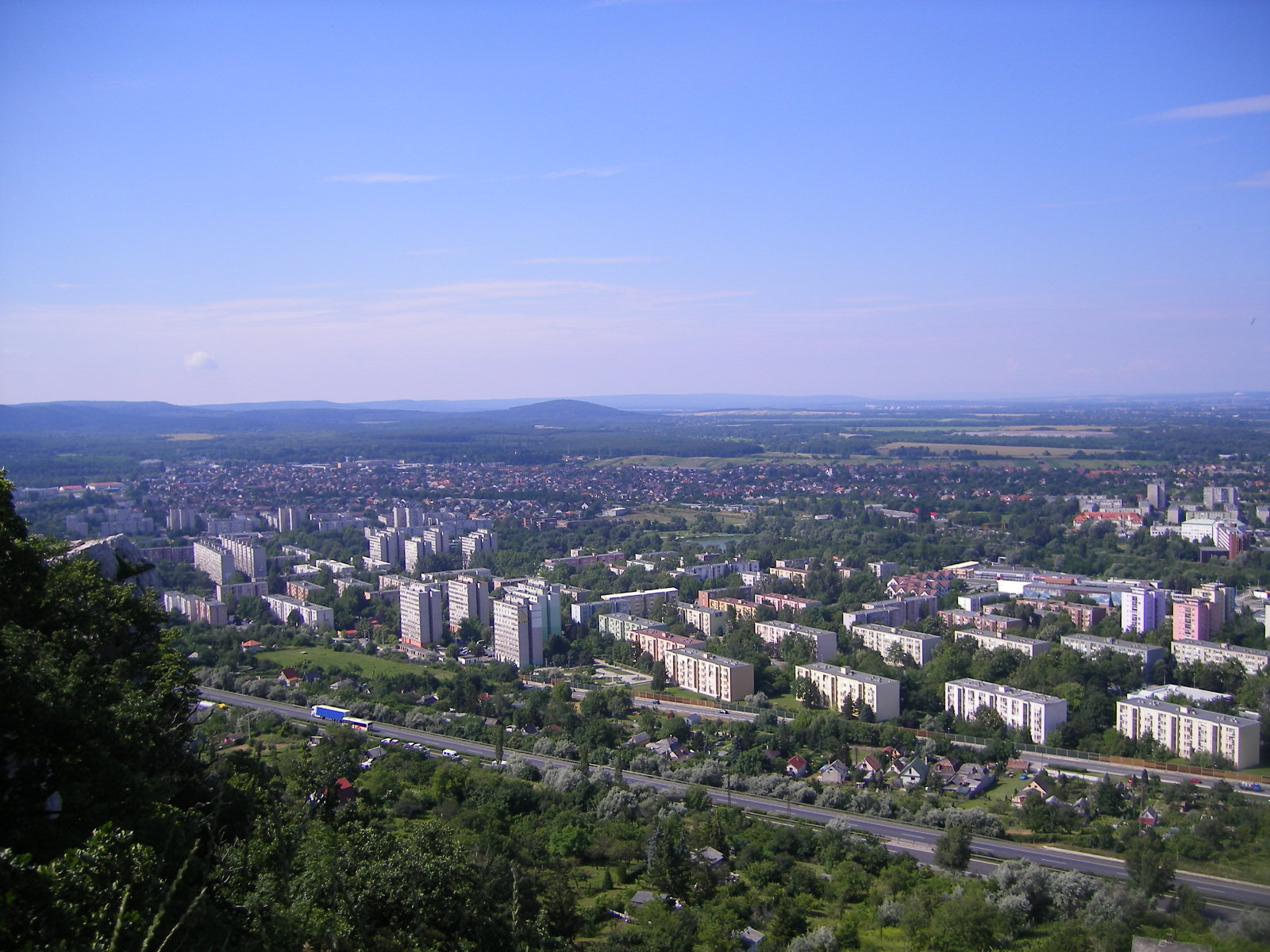
Communist housing developments in Tatabánya

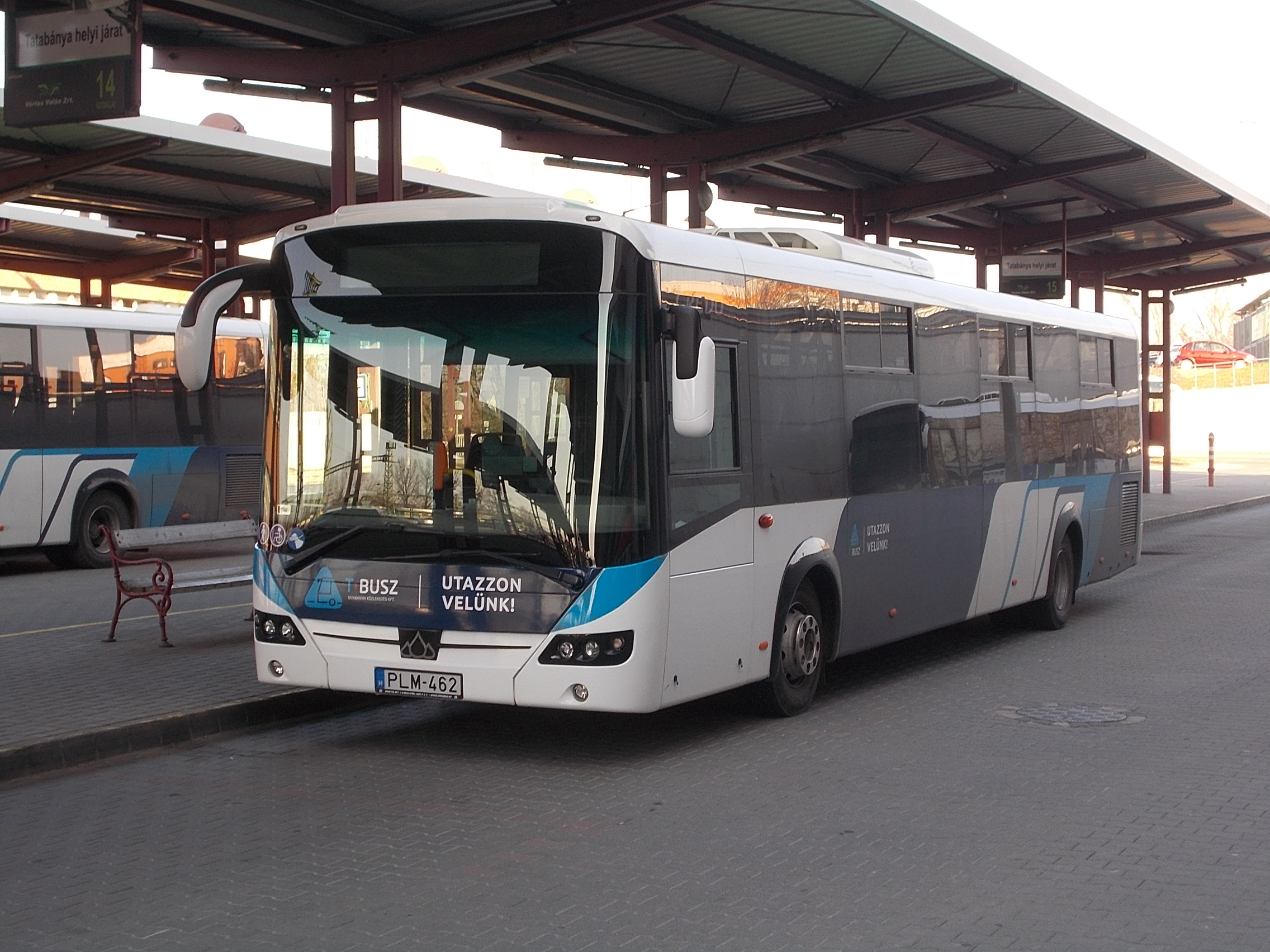
Credo Econell at Tatabánya bus station

According to the 2001 census, Tatabánya had 28,912 households and 92% of them had central heating and telephone access. Almost all households have access to the cable TV network. 98% of the city roads are paved, mass transport is well organized. T-Busz provides local bus services and KNYKK provides the regional bus services.

== Education ==
Until the mid-20th century, educational standards in the city were average, but in the second half of the century they deteriorated to below average, mostly because the local mines did not require their employees to have a high level of education. By the end of the 20th century, this trend had reversed again. The city currently has two colleges, ten secondary schools, 16 primary schools, 18 kindergartens, and five crèches.

== Culture and sports ==
The most important cultural institution is the Mari Jászai Theatre. The city has several other institutions, including museums and libraries.

Tatabánya has a football team called FC Tatabánya, founded in 1910. The town also has a successful handball team, Tatabánya KC.

One of Tatabánya's most prominent residents is József Kiprich, formally known as "the Wizard from Tatabánya". He became the top goalscorer in the Hungarian League in 1985, scoring 18 goals in 26 matches. In total, he played nine seasons at Tatabánya before making the move to the Netherlands. He had just played his first match in his 10th season at Tatabánya when Feyenoord of Rotterdam got interested in signing him. Kiprich didn't hesitate and signed a contract and left Tatabánya for Rotterdam. He is also one of Hungary's top goal scorers. In eleven seasons of football with the Hungarian national team, "the Wizard" managed to score 28 goals in 70 appearances.

== Sights ==
The Turul monument, above the city on the top of Gerecse Mountain, is the largest bird statue in Central Europe.

The Szelim cave and the forest park of Gerecse Mountain are local tourist attractions.

== Politics ==
The mayor of Tatabánya is Ilona Szücsné Posztovics (DK).

The local Municipal Assembly, elected at the 2019 local government elections, is made up of 18 members (1 Mayor, 12 Individual constituencies MEPs and 5 Compensation List MEPs) divided into this political parties and alliances:

Party	Seats	Current Municipal Assembly
Fidesz-KDNP	8	
Opposition coalition (Note: Coalition of DK-Jobbik-MSZP-Momentum-Dialogue.)	5	
Independents	4	M
Our Homeland Movement	1	

=== List of mayors ===
List of City Mayors since 1990:

Member	Party	Term of office
János Bencsik	Fidesz-KDNP	1990–2010
Csaba Schmidt	Fidesz-KDNP	2010–2019
Ilona Szücsné Posztovics	Independent	2019–

== Town districts ==
Tatabánya is divided into eight districts:

- Alsógalla
- Sárberek
- Újváros
- Bánhida
- Kertváros
- Dózsakert
- Felsőgalla
- Óváros

== Nearby villages ==
- Gyermely
- Héreg
- Környe
- Szárliget
- Szomor
- Tarján
- Tardos
- Várgesztes
- Vértessomló
- Vértesszőlős

== Notable people ==
- Éva Csernoviczki (born 1986), judoka
- Rita Deli (born 1972), handball player
- András Dombai (born 1979), footballer
- Bernadett Ferling (born 1977), handball player
- Ádám Gyurcsó (born 1991), football winger
- Anita Herr (born 1987), handball player
- Orsolya Herr (born 1984), handball player
- Viktor Kassai (born 1975), football referee
- Andrea Keszler (born 1989), short-track speed-skater
- Klára Killermann (1929-2012), breaststroke swimmer
- József Kiprich (born 1963), football striker
- Béla Kovács (born 1937), clarinetist
- László Kovács (born 1951), football goalkeeper
- Zsolt Kunyik (born 1974), judoka
- Csaba Kuzma (born 1954), light-heavyweight boxer
- Ferenc Machos (1934-2006), footballer
- Viktória Pácz (born 1990), handball player
- Josef Papp (1933-1989), American engineer
- Csaba Schmidt (born 1979), chemist and politician, mayor of Tatabánya
- Szandra Szalay (born 1989), triathlete
- Patricia Szölösi (born 1991), handballer
- László Szűcs (born 1991), footballer
- István Vincze (born 1967), footballer
- Miklós Fehér (1979-2004) footballer

== Twin towns – sister cities ==
Tatabánya is twinned with:

- Aalen, Germany (1987)
- Banská Štiavnica, Slovakia (2017)
- Będzin, Poland (2000)
- Christchurch, United Kingdom (1992)
- Fairfield, United States (1993)
- Odorheiu Secuiesc, Romania (2000)
- Izhevsk, Russia (1992)

=== Town partnerships ===
Tatabánya also maintains partnerships with:

- Arad, Romania
- Hoogezand-Sappemeer, Netherlands
- Nové Zámky, Slovakia
- Saint-Ghislain, Belgium
- Saint-Lô, France

== Gallery ==
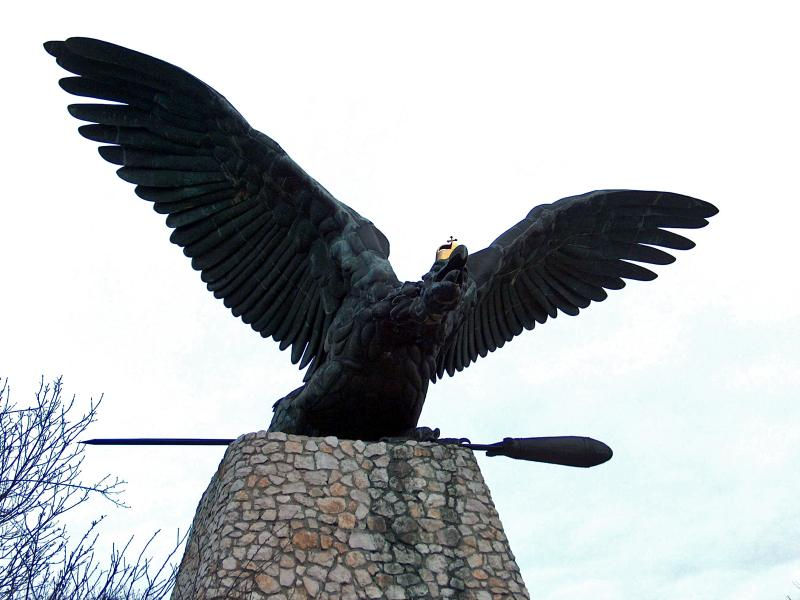
The Turul monument, which towers over the town from Gerecse mountain

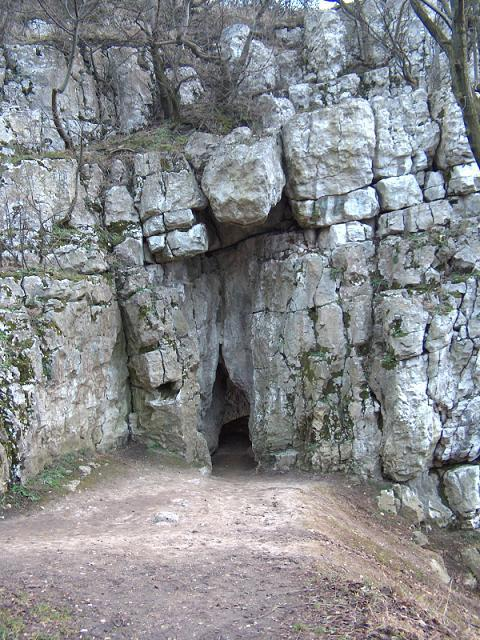
Szelim cave, northern entrance

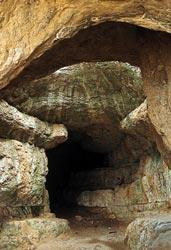
Szelim cave, view from inside

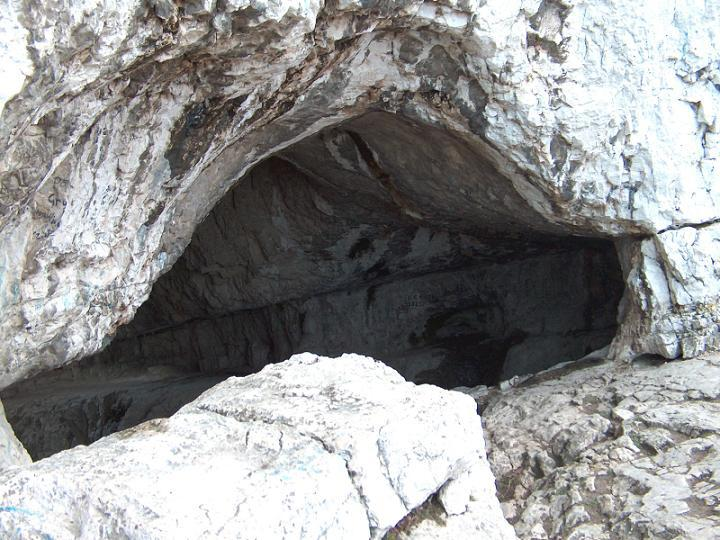
Szelim cave, western entrance

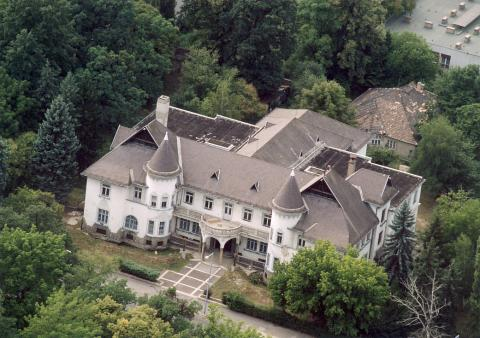
Tulip house

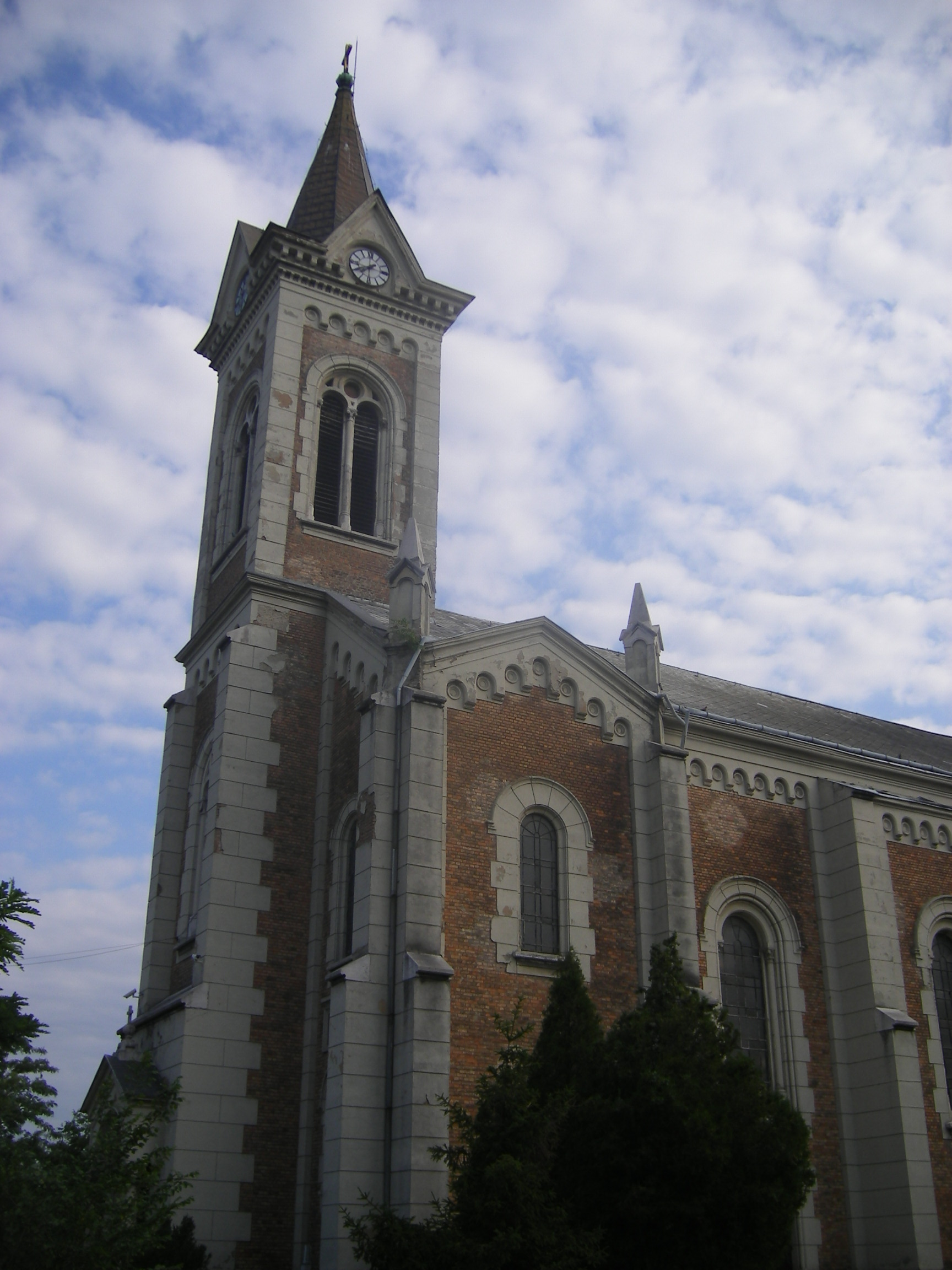
Catholic church
