= Salaj (surname) =

Salaj (Serbian Cyrillic: Салај) is a surname. Notable people with the surname include:

- Đuro Salaj (1889–1958), Yugoslav politician
- Ivan Salaj (1961–2020), Serbian basketball player

== See also ==
- Szalay
