= Szandra Szalay =

Hungarian triathlete

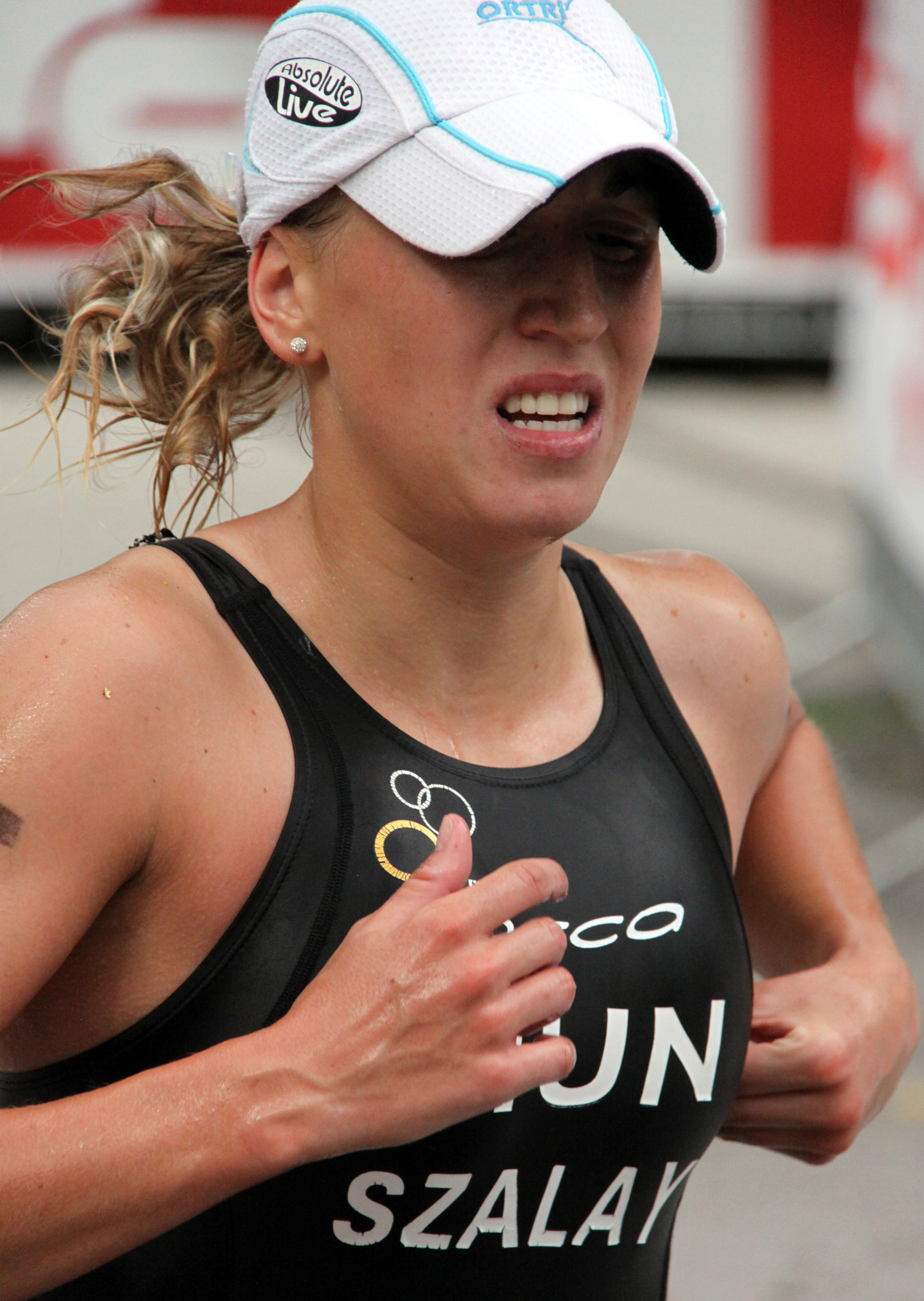
Szandra Szalay at the World Championship Series triathlon in Kitzbuhel, 2010.

Szandra Szalay (born 30 July 1989 in Tatabánya), is a Hungarian professional triathlete and the third best Hungarian triathlete of the year 2010 according to the Hungarian Ranglista, i.e. National Championship Series.

In 2007, Szandra Szalay took part in her first ITU triathlon and won the Junior European Cup in Tiszaújváros, as in 2008, the year in which she won the silver medal at the European Championships. Since 2006 Szandra Szalay represents the club ORTRI, located in Oroszlány near her hometown Tatabánya. Her coach is Licskó Csaba. Together with Zsófia Tóth, until 2008 also a member of ORTRI, and Zsófia Kovács Szandra Szalay may be considered one of Hungary's most promising hopes for the Olympic Games in London 2012.

In 2011, Szalay will also take part in the German Bundesliga circuit and represent the team EJOT.

Szandra Szalay attended the Váci Mihály Általános Iskola elementary school and the Péch Antal Műszaki Szakközép Iskola és Gimnázium highschool in Tatabánya.

== ITU Competitions ==
In the four years from 2007 to 2010 Szandra Szalay took part in 29 ITU competitions and achieved 10 top ten positions. The following list is based upon the official ITU rankings and the athlete's Profile Page. Unless indicated otherwise all events are triathlons and belong to the Elite category.

Date	Competition	Place	Rank
2007-05-19	Duathlon World Championships (Junior)	Győr	6
2007-06-29	European Championships (Junior)	Copenhagen	15
2007-08-12	European Cup (Junior)	Tiszaújváros	1
2007-08-30	BG World Championships (Junior)	Hamburg	23
2008-05-10	European Championships (Junior)	Lisbon	16
2008-05-18	European Cup	Brno	8
2008-05-24	Duathlon European Championships (Junior)	Serres	2
2008-06-05	BG World Championships (Junior)	Vancouver	14
2008-06-14	European Cup	Balatonfüred	DNS
2008-07-12	European Cup (Junior)	Tiszaújváros	1
2008-09-06	European Championships (U23)	Pulpí	13
2008-09-27	Duathlon World Championships (Junior)	Rimini	DNF
2009-05-23	Duathlon European Championships (U23)	Budapest	DNF
2009-06-20	European Championships (U23)	Tarzo Revine	7
2009-08-09	World Cup	Tiszaújváros	24
2009-08-15	Dextro Energy World Championship Series	London	27
2009-08-23	European Cup	Karlovy Vary (Carlsbad)	11
2009-09-26	European Cup	Mar Menor	12
2009-11-21	Premium European Cup	Eilat	11
2010-04-17	European Cup	Antalya	2
2010-05-22	European Cup	Senec	5
2010-05-30	African Cup	Larache	3
2010-06-05	Dextro Energy World Championship Series	Madrid	46
2010-07-10	World Cup	Holten	36
2010-07-24	Dextro Energy World Championship Series	London	42
2010-08-08	World Cup	Tiszaújváros	21
2010-08-14	Dextro Energy World Championship Series	Kitzbuhel	36
2010-08-28	European Championships (U23)	Vila Nova de Gaia (Porto)	12
2010-09-08	Dextro Energy World Championship Series, Grand Final: U23 World Championship	Budapest	DNF
2010-09-08	Aquathlon World Championships	Budapest	2

BG = the sponsor British Gas · DNF = did not finish · DNS = did not start
