= Szelim Cave =

Cave and archaeological site in Hungary

- Szelim-barlang
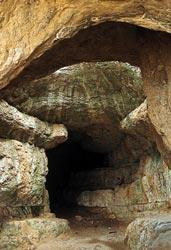
- Szelim Cave

- Location in Hungary
- 47°35′25″N 18°24′25″E
- Periods: Upper Paleolithic
- Location: Gerecse Mountains, near Tatabánya
- Region: Komárom-Esztergom County, Central Transdanubia, Hungary

Site notes
- Material: karst, limestone
- Height: 14 m (46 ft)
- Length: 45 m (148 ft)
- Excavation dates: 1932, 1934
- Archaeologists: Hubert Kessler, István Gaál

The Szelim Cave (Hungarian: Szelim-barlang or Szelim-lyuk (Szelim hole), Bánhidai nagy barlang (Bánhidian big cave), Eperjes-barlang, Szemi-luki, Szemi-lyuka, Szelimluk barlang, Bánhidai-zsomboly, Szent Vit-barlang) is located in northwestern Hungary at the western margin of the Gerecse Mountains, 289 m (948 ft) above the Által-ér Valley near Tatabánya city. The cave interior is 45 m (148 ft) long and 14 m (46 ft) high. The site has been regularly frequented and used as a shelter by local villagers over the centuries, is easily accessible and its huge rectangular entrance features a memorial of the Turul.

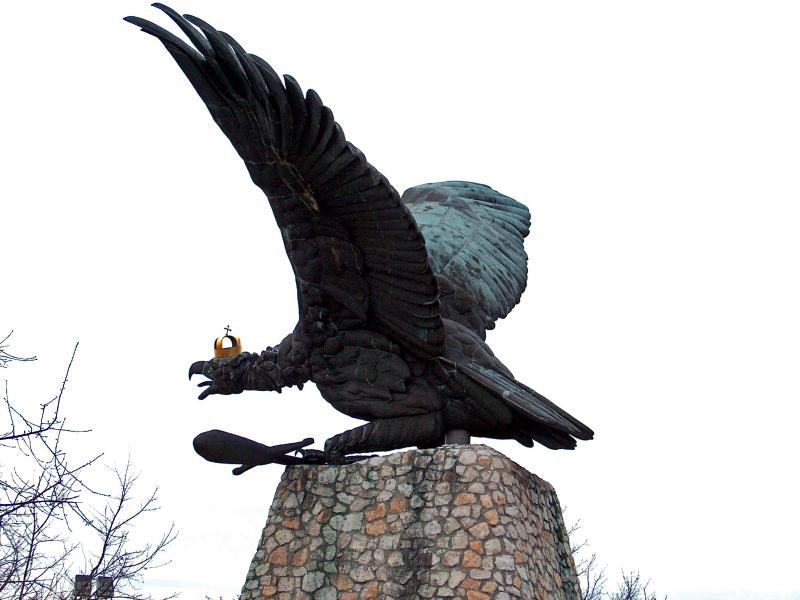
Turul with the Holy Crown of Hungary, Tatabánya, Hungary

== Geology ==
The karstic cave was formed during the Upper Trias, has undergone and will further undergo extensive corrosion. Meteoric water infiltrates the compact Mesozoic limestone and is going to carve cavities into the bedrock, solve the limestone and abrade the cavities with the debris and rocks.

== Excavations ==
The cave was recognized as an archaeological site only relatively late. In 1932 Hubert Kessler, the first promoter of speleological research, began excavations. The results of Kessler work encouraged István Gaál to start regular excavations. In 1934 the Natural History Research Council supplied - although insufficient - the financial means for further work. Remains of hearths, stoves, carvings, animal bones and human remains, some of which date to the era of Turkish invasions in early modernity were excavated.

The sediments are more than 12 m (39 ft) deep and rich in archaeological finds, that were extracted to the bedrock in a few months in most of the cave. More recent research results confirm the notion that human occupation in Szelim dates back as far as 200,000 years BP. Mousterian artefacts and stone tools discovered in the stratae date back to the Upper Paleolithic.

In 2013 the Hungarian Ministry of Interior declared the site a protected natural national asset.

== Legends of the cave ==
The cave is the subject of several historical legends.

- According to oral tradition the population of 7 neighboring villages escaped to the depths of the cave during the Turkish wars from Szelim sultan's troops who devastated Transdanubia. Unfortunately, the Turks found the people who were hidden there and killed them with the smoke of the bonfire they poured into the opening of the cave.
- During the Tartar invasions, the populations of nearby villages sought refuge in the cave. During their concealment, a young boy became thirsty and started crying, which led his mother to take him to a nearby spring for water. However, this exposed them to Tartar scouts. The mother and son were captured, and under coercion, the mother revealed the location of the other villagers. The Tartars then seized the opportunity to capture all those who were hiding in the cave.

== Pictures ==
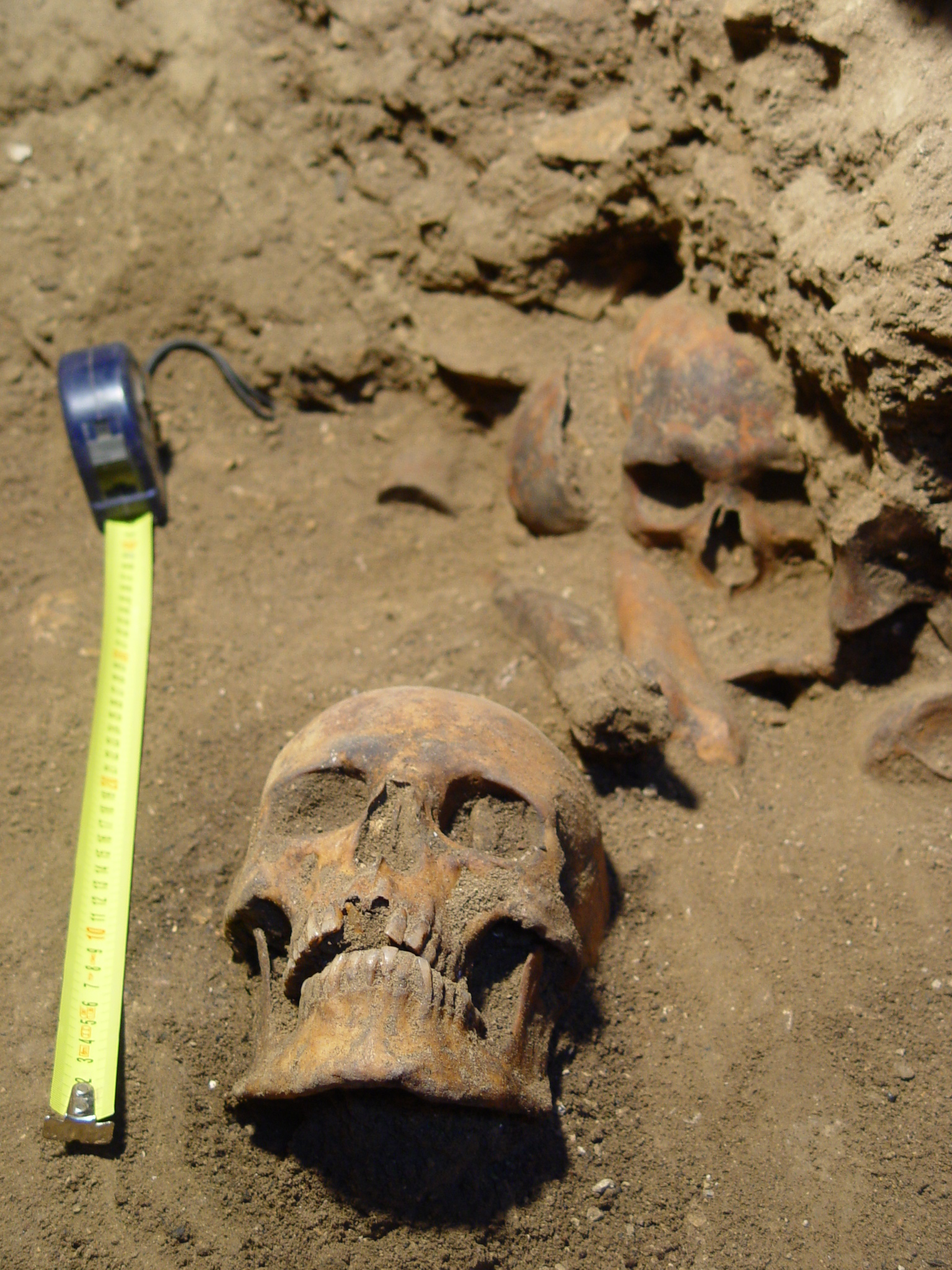

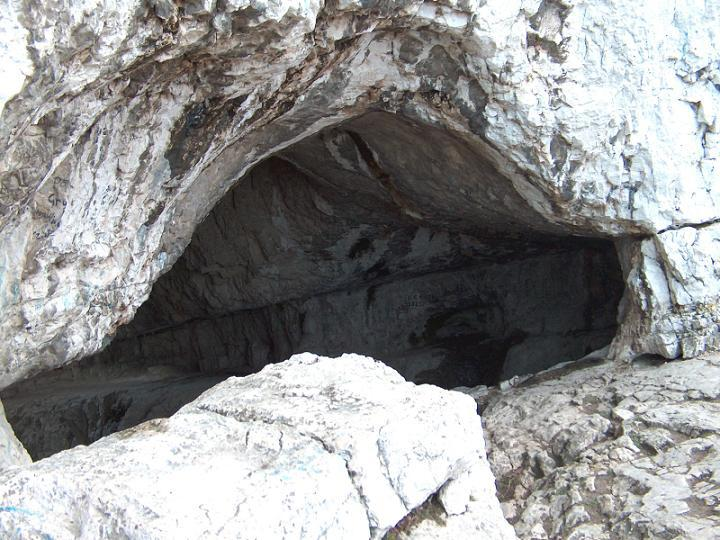

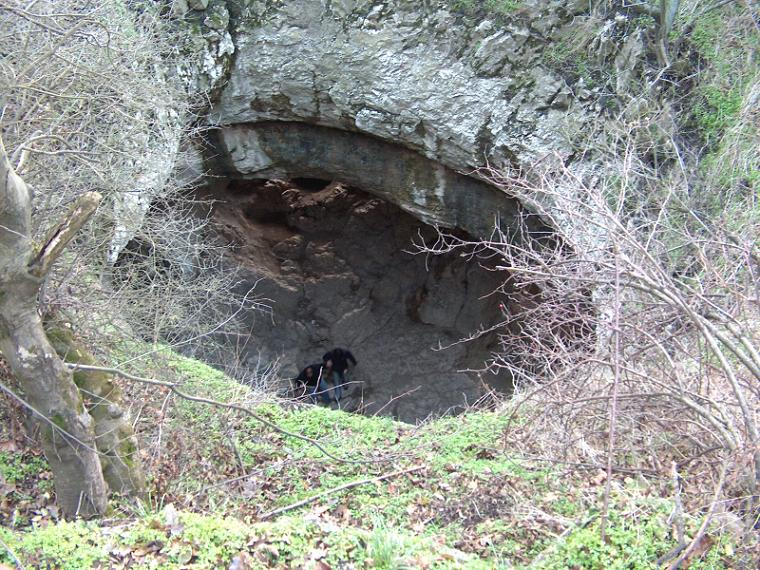

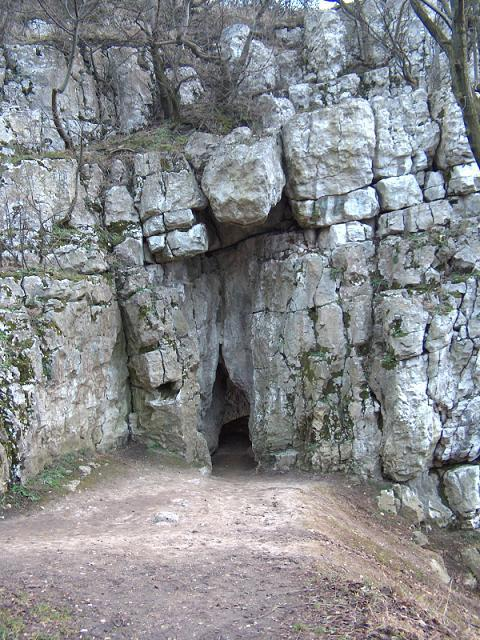

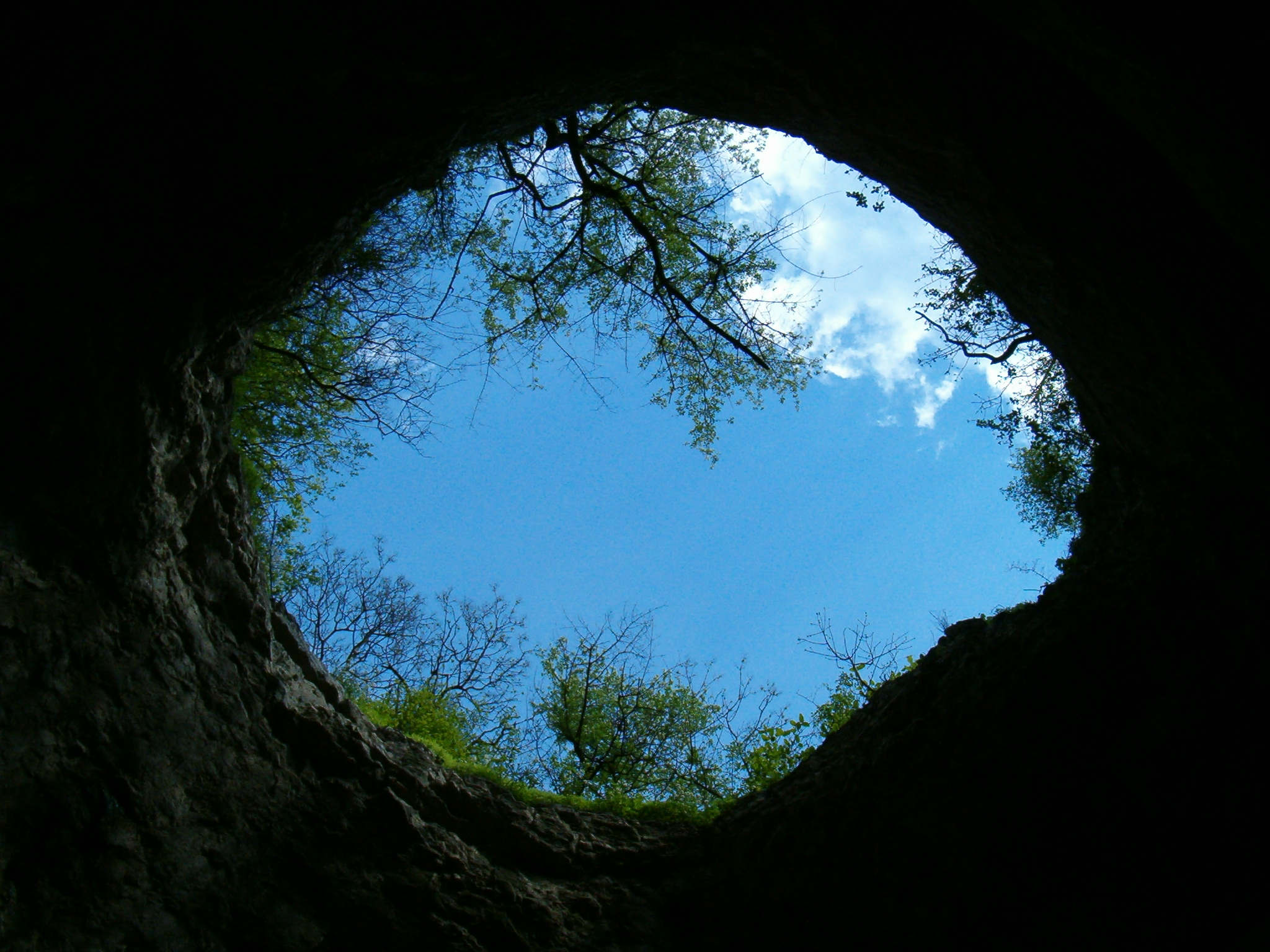
