= List of administrative divisions of the Kingdom of Hungary =

The following lists show the administrative divisions of the lands belonging to the Hungarian crown (1000–1920) at selected points of time. The names are given in the main official language used in the Kingdom at the times in question.

For details on the functioning and development of the counties and some other administrative divisions see Counties of the Kingdom of Hungary.

Map of the counties in the Kingdom of Hungary around 1880

== Notes ==
This article does not show all states of administrative divisions that existed throughout the centuries, only the major ones. Especially for the medieval period, various sources often give slightly different divisions. Also, the lists of the individual points of time stem from different sources so that the first-level categorization is not necessarily compatible over time.

== 1038 ==
- Arad
- Bács (predecessor of present Bács-Kiskun)
- Baranya (predecessor of present Baranya County)
- Bars
- Békés (predecessor of present Békés County)
- Bihar (predecessor of present Hajdú-Bihar)
- Bodrog
- Borsod (predecessor of present Borsod-Abaúj-Zemplén)
- Borsova
- Csanád
- Csongrád (predecessor of present Csongrád County)
- Fejér (predecessor of present Fejér)
- Gömör
- Hont
- Keve
- Kolon
- Komárom (predecessor of present Komárom-Esztergom)
- Krassó
- Nyír
- Nyitra
- Pozsony
- Sasvár
- Somogy (predecessor of present Somogy)
- Sopron (predecessor of present Sopron County)
- Temes
- Tolna (predecessor of present Tolna County)
- Ung
- Újvár I.
- Újvár II. (Aba-újvár, predecessor of present Borsod-Abaúj-Zemplén)
- Valkó
- Veszprém (predecessor of present Veszprém County)
- Visegrád
- Zaránd
- Zemplén (predecessor of present Borsod-Abaúj-Zemplén)

== Around 1074 ==
Around 1074, the whole Kingdom of Hungary consisted of some 45–50 counties. The existence of many of them is disputed for this time period.

=== Counties ===
- Albae Iuliensis
- Albensis (a very big county)
- Aradiensis
- Bacsensis (southern part of the later Bacsensis)
- Baranyiensis (incl. the other Drava bank with Požega)
- Barsiensis
- Bihariensis (bigger than the later Bihariensis)
- Bekesiensis
- Bodrogiensis (northern part of the later Bacsensis)
- Borsodiensis
- Borsova (approximately later Bereghiensis);
- Castriferrei
- Comaromiensis
- Csanadiensis
- Csongradiensis
- Dobocensis (around Dăbâca)
- Hontensis – maybe
- Jauriensis
- Karakó (between Castriferrei and Vespriminiensis)
- Kéve (northern part of the later Torontaliensis)
- Kolon (later called Szaladiensis, but here incl. the other Drava bank)
- Colosiensis
- Krassovinsis
- Krasznensis (around Crasna) – maybe
- Kukoliensis
- Mosoniensis
- Neogradiensis
- Nitriensis
- Novi Castri (the later Abaujvariensis + southern Sarosiensis + Hevesiensis)
- Wissegradensis (the later county Pesthiensis and Pilisensis)
- Posoniensis
- Simigiensis (incl. the other Drava bank)
- Soproniensis
- Strigoniensis
- Szabolcsensis
- Szathmariensis
- Szolnokiensis I (around Szolnok)
- Szolnokiensis II (around Dej)
- Temesiensis
- Tolnensis
- Thordensis
- Trenchiniensis – annexed at the end of the 11th century only
- Tornensis
- Unghvariensis
- Vukovariensis
- Vesprimiensis
- Zarandiensis (in the Körös river basin)
- Zempliniensis – maybe

=== Frontier counties ===
The following castles are assumed to have been seats of frontier counties (marchiae, határispánságok), it is probable that other castles were such seats as well (ordered from the north to the south):

- in present-day Slovakia: Bratislava (at that time: Bresburc/ Preslawaspurch/Poson), Hlohovec (at that time: Golguc/Golgoc), Trenčín (at that time: Treinchen), Beckov (at that time: Blundus), Nitra (at that time: Nitria), Šintava (at that time: Sempte), Gemer Castle (at that time: Gomur), Zemplin Castle (at that time: Zemněn, Zemlyn)
- in present-day Ukraine: Uzhhorod (Ungvár), Borsova
- in present-day Hungary: Moson Castle, Sopron, Novum Castrum (Hungarian at that time: Újvár), Borsod Castle, Vasvár, Karakó (near Jánosháza), Zalavár (called Kolon at that time)
- present-day Romania: Dobaca (Hungarian: Doboka), Alba Iulia (Hungarian: Gyulafehérvár), Cluj-Napoca (Hungarian: Kolozsvár), Satu Mare (Hungarian: Szatmárnémeti), Timișoara (Hungarian: Temesvár), Turda (Hungarian: Torda)
- present-day Croatia: Vukovar (Hungarian: Valkóvár)
- present-day Serbia: Belgrade (Hungarian at that time: Fehérvár), Stara Palanka (Hungarian: Haram (Krassó)), Kovin (Hungarian: Kéve)

== 15th century ==
In the late 14th and in the 15th century there were around 70 counties, out of which 7(?) under the voivodship of Transylvania (in present-day Romania), 7 under the banate of Slavonia (mainly in present-day Slavonia and Croatia), and the rest forming Hungary proper (mainly present-day Hungary and Slovakia, with 10 counties entirely and 11 partially in present-day Slovakia.

=== Counties ===
==== Hungary proper ====
- Albensis
- Abaujvariensis
- Aradiensis
- Arvensis
- Bacsensis
- Baranyiensis
- Barsiensis
- Bekesiensis
- Bereghiensis
- Bihariensis
- Borsodiensis
- Castriferrei
- Comaromiensis
- Csanadiensis
- Csongradiensis
- Gömöriensis
- Hevesiensis
- Honthiensis
- Jauriensis
- Kéve
- Kishontensis
- Krassovinsis
- Krasznensis
- Lyptoviensis
- Maramarusiensis
- Mosoniensis
- Nagysziget
- Nitriensis
- Neogradiensis
- Pesthiensis
- Pilisensis
- Poseganus
- Posoniensis
- Sarosiensis
- Scepusiensis
- Simigiensis
- Sirmiensis
- Soproniensis
- Strigoniensis
- Szabolcsensis
- Szaladiensis
- Szathmariensis
- Szolnok exterior (Külső-Szolnok)
- Szolnok mediocris (Közép-Szolnok)
- Temesiensis
- Thurociensis
- Tolnensis
- Tornensis
- Torontaliensis
- Trenchiniensis
- Ugotgensis
- Unghvariensis
- Vesprimiensis
- Vukovariensis
- Zarandiensis
- Zempliniensis
- Zoliensis

==== Transylvania ====
- Albae Iuliensis
- Barcia (also: Burcia, Burica)
- Bistricia
- Colosiensis
- Dobocensis
- Fogarasiensis
- Hunyadensis
- Kukoliensis
- Szászföld (literally "Saxony")
- Szolnok interior (Belső-Szolnok)
- Thordensis

==== Croatia-Slavonia ====
- Crisiensis
- Dubicensis
- Orbasz (also spelled Vrbas, Wrbas, Urbas etc. )
- Szana (at the Sana River)
- Varasdinensis
- Verovitiensis
- Zagrabiensis

==== Banates ====
- Nándorfehérvár (Hungarian: Nándorfehérvári bánság)
- Jajca (Hungarian: Jajcai bánság)
- Macsó (Hungarian: Macsói bánság)
- Szörény (Hungarian: Szörényi bánság)
- Szrebernik (Hungarian: Szreberniki bánság)

=== Special status ===
==== Hungary proper ====
- Halasszék (a sedes)
- Jászság
- Kolbázszék (a sedes)
- Kunság
- Provincia XXIV oppidorum terrae Scepusiensis (in 1412, thirteen of the towns were pawned to Poland and kept a special status)

==== Transylvania ====
- Aranyensis sedes (Hungarian:Aranyosszék)
- Csikiensis sedes (Csíkszék)
- Giergiensis sedes (Gyergyószék)
- Kászonszék (a sedes; Casin in Romanian)
- Kesdiensis sedes (Kézdiszék)
- Marusiensis sedes (Marosszék)
- Orbai sedes (Orbaiszék)
- Sepsiensis sedes (Sepsiszék)
- Udvarhelyensis sedes (Udvarhelyszék)

=== Free royal towns and the mining towns (Liberae regiae civitate et civitates montanae) ===
Their number was changing (the mining towns were largely situated in the Upper Lands – present-day Slovakia)

== 16th–18th centuries ==
In the 16th century, the Kingdom was so gravely impacted by Ottoman conquest that its territory was reduced to almost a third of its previous size. By 1541, the remaining part was renamed Royal Hungary and ruled by the Habsburgs.

=== Captaincies (1547 – 1699) ===
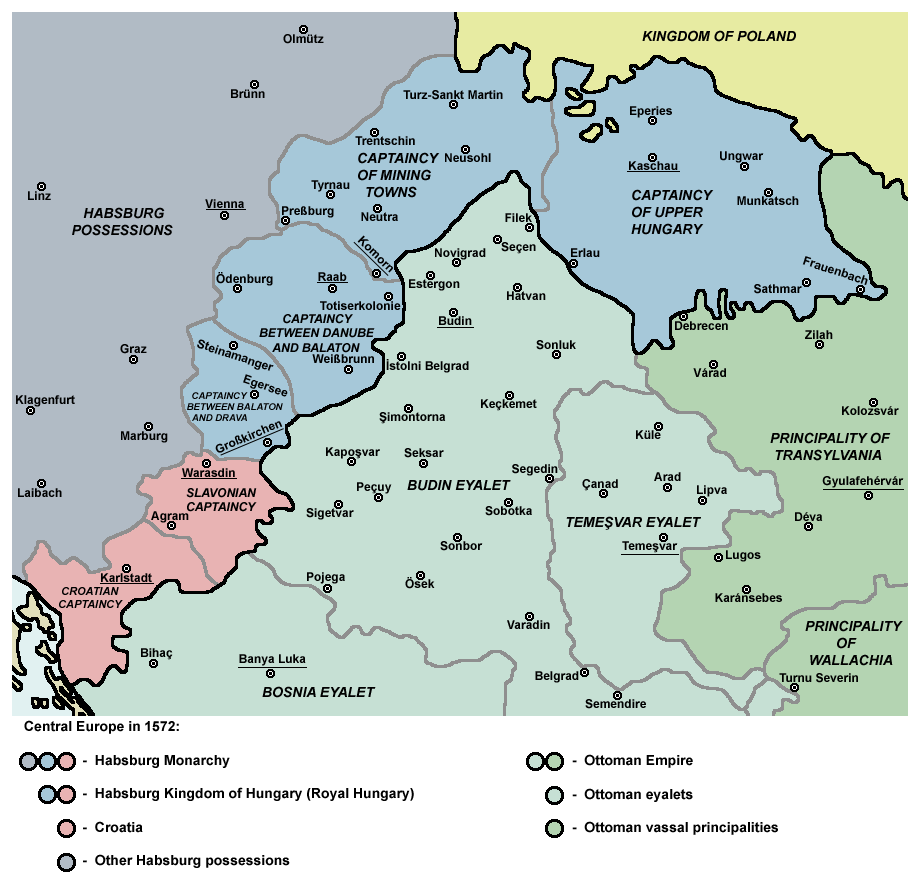
Map of captaincies of Royal Hungary in 1572

In 1547, Royal Hungary was divided for military and partly also administrative purposes in two captaincies-general (Hungarian: főkapitányságok, Slovak: hlavné kapitanáty):

- Cisdanubia (largely present-day Slovakia)
- Transdanubia (the remaining Royal Hungary).

Later on, these captaincies were further subdivided.

In 1553 and 1578, southern and southeastern regions were split off into the Military Frontier and were de facto no longer part of the Kingdom.

Also, after 1606 there were the following captaincies-general:

- Captaincy of Upper Hungary (eastern Slovakia and adjacent northeastern present-day Hungary, part of present-day northern Romania and part of Carpathian Ruthenia, created 1563)
- Captaincy of Lower Hungary (western and central Slovakia, created 1563)
- Captaincy of Győr (territories between Lake Balaton and river Danube)
- Captaincy of Kanizsa (western Hungary)
- Captaincy of Croatia (western Croatia)
- Captaincy of Slavonia (northern Croatia)

=== Counties (1699–1848) ===
Hungary c. 1825, shown divided into districts/circles, counties and autonomous districts (shaded pink). Slavonia and adjacent parts of the Military Frontier and Transylvania (labelled as Siebenbürgen and including the Partium counties) are also shown. (Names in German.)

Note that many of the counties ceased to exist during the Turkish occupation (app. 1541 – 1699/1718). For administrative divisions on the Turkish territory see Ottoman Hungary.

After the defeat of the Turks there were some 70 counties in the whole Kingdom of Hungary again. After the final defeat of the Turks in 1718, the former Temeşvar Eyalet became the special administrative district Banatus Temesiensis (Hungarian: Temesi Bánság). This district was dissolved in 1779 and divided into the Temesiensis, Torontaliensis and Krassovinsis counties; its southernmost part remained part of the Military Frontier (Confiniaria militaria) until the late 19th century.

The following list does not show Transylvania. The districtus (or circulus, 'circle') is a traditional formal division. Note that some of the previous counties, e.g. the Zarandiensis, were part of Transylvania (the Partium) at this time.

(a) Districtus Cis-Danubianus (13):

- Arvensis
- Bacsensis
- Barsiensis
- Honthiensis
- Lyptoviensis
- Nitriensis
- Neogradiensis
- Pesthiensis
- Posoniensis
- Strigoniensis
- Trenchiniensis
- Turocziensis
- Zoliensis

(b) Districtus Trans-Danubianus (11):

- Albensis
- Baranyiensis
- Castriferrei
- Comaromiensis
- Jauriensis
- Mosoniensis,
- Simigiensis
- Soproniensis
- Tolnensis
- Vesprimiensis
- Szaladiensis

(c) Districtus Cis-Tybiscanus (10):

- Abaujvariensis
- Bereghiensis
- Borsodiensis
- Gömöriensis
- Hevesiensis et Szolnok mediocris
- Sarosiensis
- Scepusiensis
- Tornensis
- Unghvariensis
- Zempliniensis

(d) Districtus Trans-Tibiscanus (12):

- Aradiensis
- Bekesiensis
- Bihariensis
- Csanadiensis
- Csongradiensis
- Krassovinsis
- Maramarosiensis
- Szabolcsensis
- Szathmariensis
- Temesiensis
- Torontaliensis
- Ugotgensis

(e) Counties between the Drava and Sava (after the defeat of the Turks in 1699, they formed the separate Kingdom of Slavonia):

- Poseganus
- Sirmiensis
- Verovitiensis/Vukovariensis

The Jászkunság and Hajdúság also existed as special autonomous districts apart from the counties.

=== Free districts (Circuli/Districtus liberi) ===
These were privileged territories, which were totally exempt from the county system.

- Districtus Jazygum et Cumanum (Hungarian: Jászkunság / Jászkun kerület)
- Oppida sedecim Scepusiensia - since 1772 (First Partition of Poland); before 1772 the towns were pawned to Poland and had another special status
- Oppida privilegiata Hajdonicalia (Hungarian: Hajdúság) – since the 17th century

=== Free royal towns and the mining towns (Liberae regiae civitate et civitates montanae) ===
Their number was changing

== After the 1848/1849 Revolution ==
For details see Comitatus (Kingdom of Hungary)

=== 1849–1860 ===
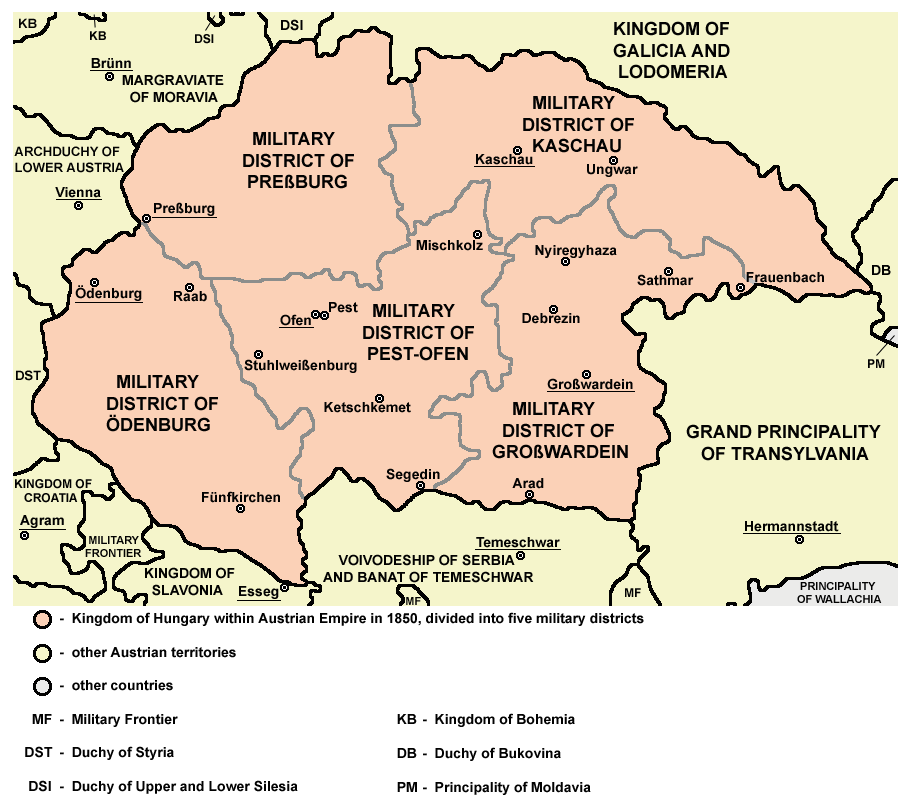
Map of the Kingdom of Hungary in 1850, showing the five military districts

Hungary c. 1856, showing the counties and five districts

During this period, the Kingdom of Croatia (with Međimurje), Kingdom of Slavonia, and the Voivodeship of Serbia and Banatus Temesiensis (Szerb vajdaság és Temesi bánság) were separated from the Kingdom of Hungary and directly subordinated to Vienna (Austria). The remaining territory of the Kingdom of Hungary (which did not include Transylvania at that time) was divided into 5 Districts. These Districts were divided into counties, whose traditional territories were modified in 1850 and 1853; several of the traditional counties were merged or partitioned. The official language during this period was German. The districts and counties were:

Pest-Ofen (Note: Officially rendered using the now-obsolete German spelling Pesth)

- Pest-Pilis. The northern part of the former Pest-Pilis-Solt County, including all of the former county of Pilis. (Note: As of 1853 Pest-Pilis comprised the Landbezirk of Ofen and the Stuhlbezirke of Ráczkevi, Waitzen, Nagy-Káta, Monor, Ócsa and Gödöllő.)
- Pest-Solt. The southern part of Pest-Pilis-Solt, including all of the former region of Solt. (Note: As of 1853 Pest-Solt comprised the Stuhlbezirke of Kis-Kőrös, Nagy-Kőrös, Duna-Vecse, Czegléd, Kalocsa and Kecskemét.)
- Stuhlweißenburg (Székesfehérvár; former Fejér County under the name of its capital Stuhlweißenburg)
- Gran (Esztergom). Comprised those areas of the former Gran/Esztergom and Komorn/Komárom Counties south of the Danube other than the Szőny suburb of Komárom (Gran Land- and Stadtbezirke; Kócs and Dotis Stuhlbezirke). Closely resembled Komárom-Esztergom County as it was between 1923 and 1938.
- Heves. Roughly the northern half of the former Heves-Külső-Szolnok County, bounded mostly by the Tisza. (Note: As of 1853 Heves comprised the Land- and Stadtbezirke of Erlau and the Stuhlbezirke of Pétervásár, Heves, and Gyöngyös.)
- Szolnok. Roughly the southern half of the former Heves-Külső-Szolnok County, bounded mostly by the Tisza. (Note: As of 1853 Szolnok comprised the Stuhlbezirke of Tisza-Füred, Mező-Túr and Szolnok.)
- Borsod
- Csongrad
- Jazygien mit Kumanien or die Districte Jazygien und Cumanien (Jászság with Kunság/the Districts of the Jászság and Kunság; i.e. Jászság, Kiskunság and Nagykunság)

Preßburg

- Preßburg (Pozsony)
- Ober-Neutra (Upper/Over Nyitra). Included those parts of Neutra/Nyitra west of the Waag. (Note: The Stuhlbezirke Miava, Pőstyén, Szenitz, Wag-Neustadtl, Skalitz.) The capital, Tyrnau, was formerly part of Preßburg/Pozsony County.
- Unter-Neutra (Lower/Under Nyitra). Included those parts of Neutra/Nyitra east of the Waag. (Note: The Land- and Stadtbezirk Neutra; the Stuhlbezirke Freistadtl, Topolcsán, Privicz and Neuhäusel.) It also included the Stuhlbezirke of Oszlán and Baan, which were formerly part of Bars and Trentschin/Trencsén Counties respectively.
- Trentschin (Trencsén)
- Arva-Turócz, (Note: Variously rendered in legislation using the spellings Arva-Thuroz, Arva-Thurócz) merger re-affirmed in 1853
- Liptau (Liptó)
- Hont
- Zohl (Zólyom)
- Bars
- Neograd (Nógrád)
- Komorn (Komárom). Comprised those areas of the former Gran/Esztergom and Komorn/Komárom Counties north of the Danube as well as Szőny directly across from Komárom (Komorn Land- and Stadtbezirke; Muzsla and Perbete Stuhlbezirke).

Ödenburg

- Wieselburg (Moson)
- Ödenburg (Sopron)
- Raab (Győr)
- Eisenburg (Vas)
- Weszprim (Veszprém)
- Szalad (Zala). Excluded the Međimurje, which was attached to Croatia.
- Sümegh (Somogy)
- Tolna
- Baranyá

Kaschau

- Gömör (Gömör-Kishont county under the name Gömör)
- Zips (Szepes)
- Saros
- Abaúj-Torna
- Zemplin (Zemplén)
- Ungh(var) (Note: Named Unghvar in 1850, Ungh in 1854) (Ung)
- Beregh-Ugocsa
- Maramaros

Großwardein

- Arad. Western part around Elek attached to Békes-Csanad in 1853.
- Csanad (1849–53)
- Bekes (1849–53)
- Békes-Csanad (1853–60). Included the former territories of Békes and Csanad as well as the area around Elek which had previously belonged to Arad county (including a salient (panhandle) of formerly Arad territory which lay between Békes and Csanad).
- Ober-Bihar (Upper/Over Bihar, 1850–53)
- Unter-Bihar (Lower/Under Bihar, 1850–53)
- Süd-Bihar (South Bihar, 1853–60). Former southern territory of Bihar (mostly delineated by the Berettyó/Barcău river and associated canals). (Note: Süd-Bihar comprised the Landbezirk of Großwardein (Hungarian: Nagyvárad, Romanian: Oradea) and the Stuhlbezirke of Ártánd, Élesd, Margita, Szalonta, Belényes and Tenke.)
- Nord-Bihar (North Bihar, 1853–60). Former northern territory of Bihar (mostly delineated by the Berettyó/Barcău river and associated canals), as well as the former Hajdúság and former western parts of Szabolcs County. (Note: Nord-Bihar comprised the Land- and Stadtbezirk of Debreczin and the Stuhlbezirke of Dorogh, Diószegh, Derecske and Püspök-Ladány.)
- Szatmar
- Szabolcz
  - Szabolcz mit den Haiduken-Städten (Szabolcz with the Hajdú cities; 1849–53). The Hajdúság and western parts of Szabolcz were attached to Nord-Bihar 1853.

=== 1860–1867 ===
In October 1860, the Districts were abolished and the pre-1848 counties were restored.

== 1867–1920 ==
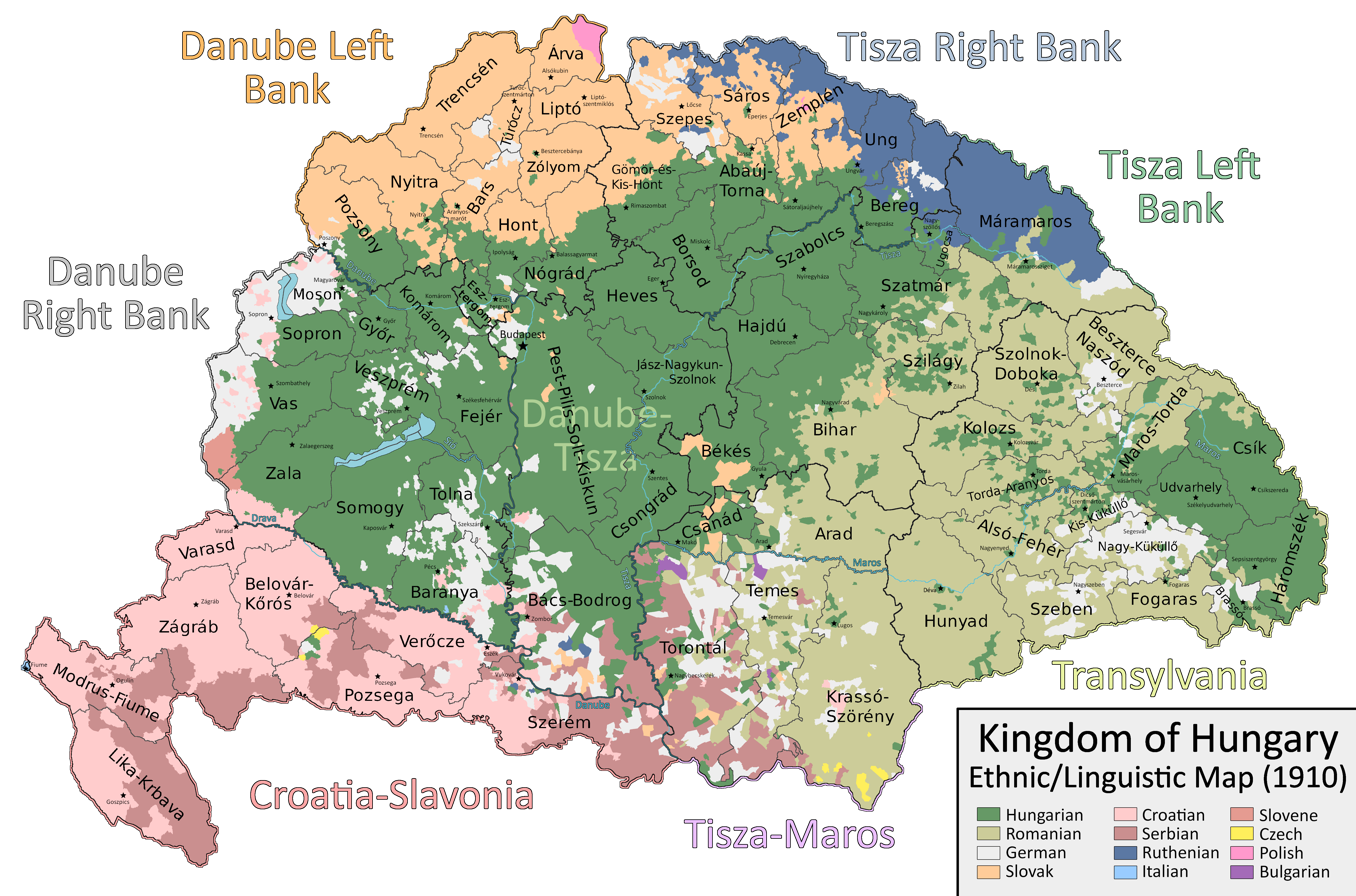
Ethnic and political situation in the Kingdom of Hungary according to the 1910 census

From 1867 the administrative and political divisions of the lands belonging to the Hungarian crown (Kingdom of Hungary) were significantly remodelled. In 1868 Transylvania was definitely reunited with Hungary proper, and the town and district of Fiume (Rijeka) declared autonomous. In 1873 part of the Military Frontier was united with Hungary proper and part with Croatia-Slavonia. Hungary proper, according to ancient usage, was generally divided into four great divisions or circles, and Transylvania up to 1876 was regarded as the fifth.

In 1876 a general system of counties was introduced. According to this division Hungary proper was divided into seven statistical regions having no administrative functions, of which Transylvania formed one.

The following administrative divisions existed between 1886 and 1920:

=== Rural counties ===
In the following, the key in the brackets gives the capital towns around 1910 first (note however that the capitals were usually changing throughout the centuries) and then the abbreviation for the country in which the territory is situated today:

- HU: present-day Hungary
- SK: present-day Slovakia
- UA: present-day Ukraine
- AT: present-day Austria
- RO: present-day Romania
- HR: present-day Croatia
- SR: present-day Serbia
- SI: present-day Slovenia
- PL: present-day Poland

The Kingdom of Hungary was divided into the following 71 counties:

==== Hungary proper ====
(a) On the left bank of the Danube:

1. Árva County (Alsókubin, SK, PL)
2. Bars County (Aranyosmarót, SK)
3. Esztergom County (Esztergom, SK, HU)
4. Hont County (Ipolyság, SK, HU)
5. Liptó County (Liptószentmiklós, SK)
6. Nógrád County (Balassagyarmat, SK, HU)
7. Nyitra County (Nyitra, SK)
8. Pozsony County (Pozsony, SK, HU)
9. Trencsén County (Trencsén, SK)
10. Turóc County (Turócszentmárton, SK)
11. Zólyom County (Besztercebánya, SK)

(b) On the right bank of the Danube:

1. Baranya County (Pécs, HU, HR)
2. Fejér County (Székesfehérvár, HU)
3. Győr County (Győr, HU, SK)
4. Komárom County (Komárom, SK, HU)
5. Moson County (Mosonmagyaróvár, HU, AT, SK)
6. Somogy County (Kaposvár, HU)
7. Sopron County (Sopron, HU, AT)
8. Tolna County (Szekszárd, HU)
9. Vas County (Szombathely, HU, AT, SI)
10. Veszprém County (Veszprém, HU)
11. Zala County (Zalaegerszeg, HU, HR, SI)

(c) Between the Danube and Tisza:

1. Bács-Bodrog County (Zombor, HU, SR)
2. Csongrád County (Szentes, HU, SR)
3. Heves County (Eger, HU)
4. Jász-Nagykun-Szolnok County (Szolnok, HU)
5. Pest-Pilis-Solt-Kiskun County (Budapest, HU)

(d) On the right bank of the Tisza:

1. Abaúj-Torna County (Kassa, SK, HU) Note: formed in 1881 from the counties of Abaúj County and Torna County.
2. Bereg County (Beregszász, UA, HU)
3. Borsod County (Miskolc, HU)
4. Gömör és Kis-Hont County (Rimaszombat, SK, HU)
5. Sáros County (Eperjes, SK)
6. Szepes County (Lőcse, SK, PL)
7. Ung County (Ungvár, UA, SK, HU)
8. Zemplén County (Sátoraljaújhely, SK, HU)

(e) On the left bank of the Tisza:

1. Békés County (Gyula, HU)
2. Bihar County (Nagyvárad, RO, HU)
3. Hajdú County (Debrecen, HU)
4. Máramaros County (Máramarossziget, UA, RO)
5. Szabolcs County (Nyíregyháza, HU, UA)
6. Szatmár County (Nagykároly, RO, HU)
7. Szilágy County (Zilah, RO)
8. Ugocsa County (Nagyszőllős, UA, RO)

(f) Between the Tisza and the Maros:

1. Arad County (Arad, RO, HU)
2. Csanád County (Makó, HU, RO)
3. Krassó-Szörény County (Lugos, RO) Note: formed in 1880 from the counties of Krassó County and Szörény County.
4. Temes County (Temesvár, RO, SR)
5. Torontál County (Nagybecskerek, SR, RO, HU)

(g) Királyhágón túl (i.e. "over the royal pass through the mountains", roughly equal to Transylvania, all in present-day Romania):

1. Alsó-Fehér County (Nagyenyed)
2. Beszterce-Naszód County (Beszterce)
3. Brassó County (Brassó)
4. Csík County (Csíkszereda)
5. Fogaras County (Fogaras)
6. Háromszék County (Sepsiszentgyörgy)
7. Hunyad County (Déva)
8. Kis-Küküllő County (Dicsőszentmárton)
9. Kolozs County (Kolozsvár)
10. Maros-Torda County (Marosvásárhely)
11. Nagy-Küküllő County (Segesvár)
12. Szeben County (Nagyszeben)
13. Szolnok-Doboka County (Dés)
14. Torda-Aranyos County (Torda)
15. Udvarhely County (Székelyudvarhely)

==== Kingdom of Croatia and Slavonia ====
Kingdom of Croatia and Slavonia was divided into eight counties (all, except for most of Syrmia, in present-day Croatia):

1. Bjelovar-Križevci (Bjelovar, HR)
2. Lika-Krbava (Gospić, HR)
3. Modruš-Rijeka (Ogulin, HR)
4. Požega (Požega, HR)
5. Syrmia (Vukovar, HR, SR)
6. Varaždin (Varaždin, HR)
7. Virovitica (Osijek, HR)
8. Zagreb (Zagreb, HR)

=== Towns with municipal rights ===
The following 30 Hungarian towns had municipal rights:

==== Hungary proper ====
Hungary proper had twenty-six urban counties or towns with municipal rights. These were:

- Arad
- Baja
- Debrecen
- Győr
- Hódmezővásárhely
- Kassa (Košice)
- Kecskemét
- Kolozsvár (Cluj)
- Komárom (Komárno)
- Marosvásárhely (Târgu Mureş)
- Miskolc (from 1909)
- Nagyvárad (Oradea)
- Pancsova (Pančevo)
- Pécs
- Pozsony (Bratislava)
- Selmecbánya and Bélabánya (Banská Štiavnica and Banská Belá) – one urban county
- Sopron
- Szabadka (Subotica)
- Szatmárnémeti (Satu Mare)
- Szeged
- Székesfehérvár
- Temesvár (Timișoara)
- Újvidék (Novi Sad)
- Versec (Vršac)
- Zombor (Sombor)
- Budapest – the capital of the country.

==== Croatia-Slavonia ====
In Croatia-Slavonia there were four urban counties or towns with municipal rights namely:

- Eszék (Osijek)
- Varasd (Varaždin)
- Zágráb (Zagreb)
- Zimony (Zemun)

=== Fiume (Rijeka) ===
The town and district of Fiume (Rijeka) formed a separate division. It was a subject of dispute between Hungary proper and Croatia-Slavonia and changed hands several times (its desirability as a seaport caused it to change hands even after the Hungarian-Croatian union eventually broke up).

== See also ==
- Regions of Hungary
- Counties of Hungary
- Demographic history of Syrmia
- Districts of Hungary (from 2013)
  - Subregions of Hungary (until 2013)
- Administrative divisions of the Kingdom of Hungary (until 1920)
  - Counties of the Kingdom of Hungary
- Administrative divisions of the Kingdom of Hungary (1941–1945)
- List of cities and towns of Hungary
- NUTS:HU
