= Perpetual count =

A perpetual count (Hungarian: örökös főispán, Latin: supremus et perpetuus comes) was a head or an ispán of a county in the Kingdom of Hungary (“Lord Lieutenant”) whose office was either hereditary or attached to the dignity of a prelate or of a great officer of the realm. The earliest examples of a perpetual ispánate are from the 12th century, but the institution flourished between the 15th and 18th centuries. Although all administrative functions of the office were abolished in 1870, the title itself was preserved until the general abolition of noble titles in Hungary in 1946.

== List of perpetual ispánates ==
=== Ex officio ispánates ===
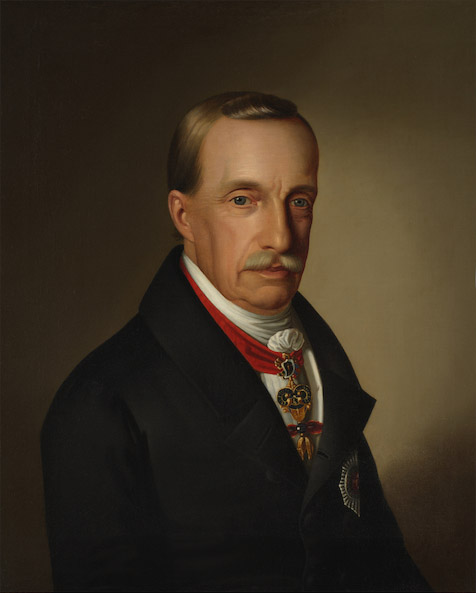
Archduke Joseph of Austria, palatine of Hungary, perpetual count of Pest and Pilis Counties

County	Perpetual count	Period	Notes	Source
Baranya	Bishop of Pécs	?–1777		
Bács	Archbishop of Kalocsa	?–1776		
Bihar	Bishop of Várad	1466–1776		
Esztergom	Archbishop of Esztergom	1270–1300; 1301–1881	granted to archbishop Philip Türje by King Stephen V King Andrew III temporarily deprived the archbishop from the ispánate castellans of the archbishops' castle at Esztergom sometimes styled themselves ispán	
Fehér	Voivode of Transylvania			
Győr	Bishop of Győr	1453–1783		
Heves	Bishop (from 1804 Archbishop) of Eger	1498–1840		
Nyitra	Bishop of Nyitra	?–1777		
Outer Szolnok	Bishop (from 1804 Archbishop) of Eger	1569–1840		
Pest	Palatine	?–1848		
Pilis	Castellan of the Visegrád Castle	?–?		
Pilis	Palatine	1569–1848		
Požega/Pozsega	Bishop of Bosznia	1753–1770	renounced of the title	
Veszprém	Bishop of Veszprém	1313–1323; 1392–1773	although King Charles I awarded the bishops with the ispánate, he seems to have failed to confirm this grant in 1323 the bishops perpetually held the office from 1392	

=== Hereditary ispánates ===
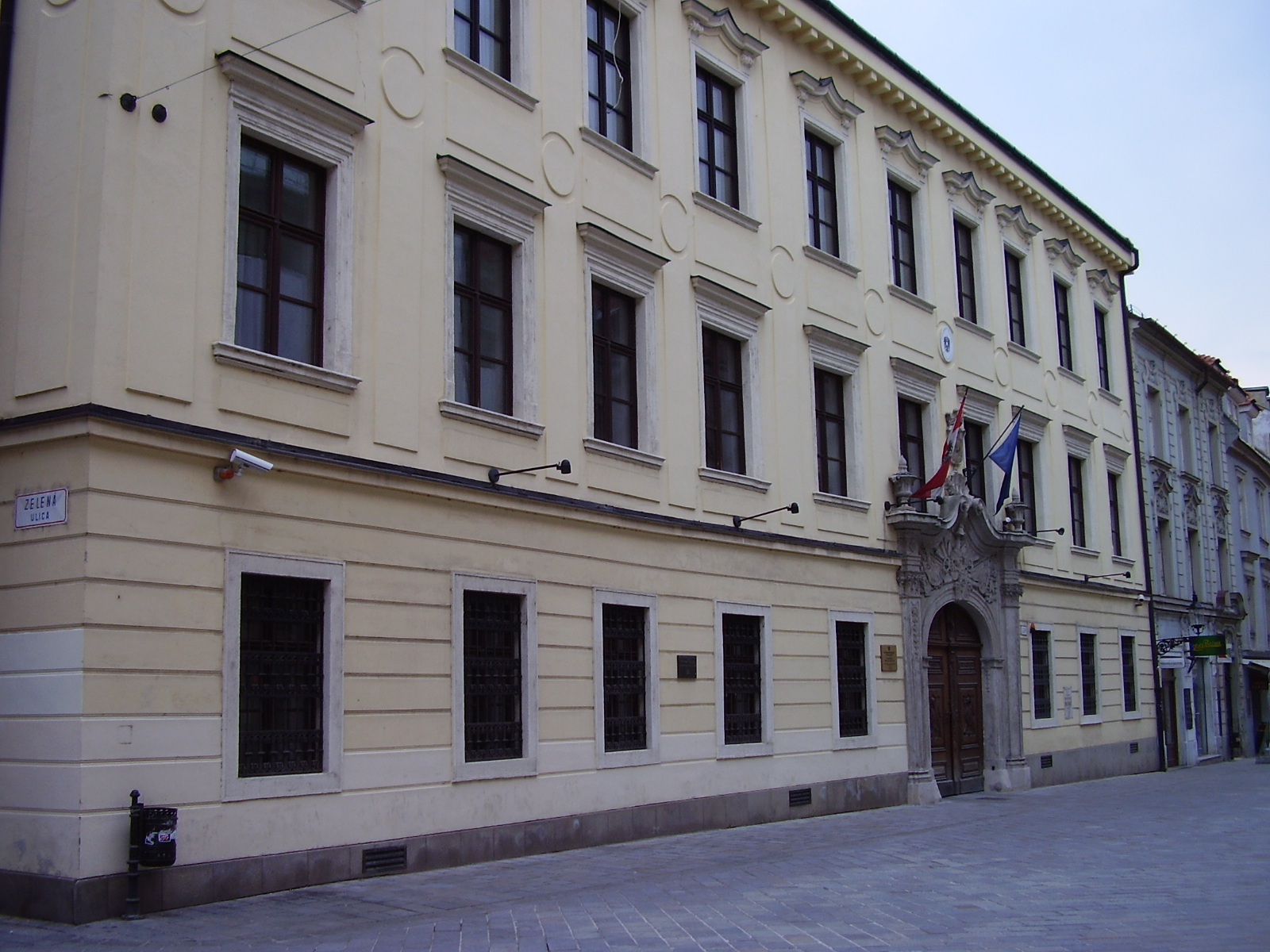
Pálffy Palace, Pressburg/Pozsony (now Bratislava, Slovakia)

County	Family	Period	Notes	Source
Abaúj	Perényi	1570–1598; 1643–1699		
Abaúj	Csáky	1702–1764		
Árva	Thurzó	1585–1626	also perpetual ispáns of Szepes County	
Árva	Thököly	1666–1668		
Bereg	Schönborn	1740–	last grant of a perpetual ispánate	
Dobor	Berislavići	1514–	a Bosnian hereditary title	
Beszterce	Hunyadi	1452–1458	earliest example of a hereditary title in Hungary proper	
Beszterce	Szilágyi	1458–?		
Hont	Koháry	1711–1826		
Komárom	Nádasdy	1751–	last grant of a perpetual ispánate	
Liptó	Illésházy	1582–1838	also perpetual ispáns of Trencsén County	
Požega/Pozsega	Keglevich	1707–1749		
Pozsony	Pálffy	1651–	always a member of the family was appointed ispán from 1580	
Sáros	Rákóczi	1666–1711	always a member of the family was appointed ispán from 1622	
Sopron	Esterházy	1686–	always a member of the family was appointed ispán from 1626	
Szepes	Szapolyai	1464–1528		
Szepes	Thurzó	1531–1635	also perpetual ispáns of Árva County	
Szepes	Csáky and later also Csáky-Pallavicini branch	1638–		
Teočak	Újlaki	1464–?	in Bosnia	
Trencsén	Illésházy	1600–1838	also perpetual ispáns of Liptó County	
Turóc	Révay	1712–1875	always a member of the family was appointed ispán from 1532	
Valkó	Draskovich	1693–1695	the county was dissolved in 1695	
Varaždin/Varasd	Erdődy	1570–c. 1582		
Varaždin/Varasd	Erdődy	1687–	always a member of the family was appointed ispán from 1607	
Vas	Batthyány	1728–		
Zala	Althann	1721–1824		

== See also ==
- County (Kingdom of Hungary)
- Ispán
