= Komárom County =

County of the Kingdom of Hungary

Komárom County Comitatus Comaromiensis (Latin) Komárom vármegye (Hungarian) Komitat Komorn (German)
- County of the Kingdom of Hungary (11th century-1786, 1790-1923, 1938-1945)
- Coat of arms

- Capital: Komárom
- Area
  - Coordinates: 47°45′N 18°8′E
  - 1910: 2,834 km^{2} (1,094 sq mi)
- Population
  - 1910: 201,800
- History
  - Established: 11th century
  - Merged into Esztergom-Komárom County: 1786
  - County recreated: 1790
  - Treaty of Trianon: 4 June 1920
  - Merged into Komárom-Esztergom County: 1923
  - County recreated (First Vienna Award): 2 November 1938
  - Remerged into Komárom-Esztergom County: 1945
- Today part of: Hungary (1,442 km^{2}); Slovakia (1,392 km^{2})
- Komárom/Komárno is the current name of the capital.

Komárom county (in Latin: comitatus Comaromiensis, in Hungarian: Komárom (vár)megye, in Slovak: Komárňanský komitát / Komárňanská stolica / Komárňanská župa, in German: Komorner Gespanschaft / Komitat Komorn) was an administrative county (comitatus) of the Kingdom of Hungary, situated on both sides of the Danube river. Today, the territory to the north of the Danube is part of Slovakia, while the territory to the south of the Danube is part of Hungary.

== Geography ==
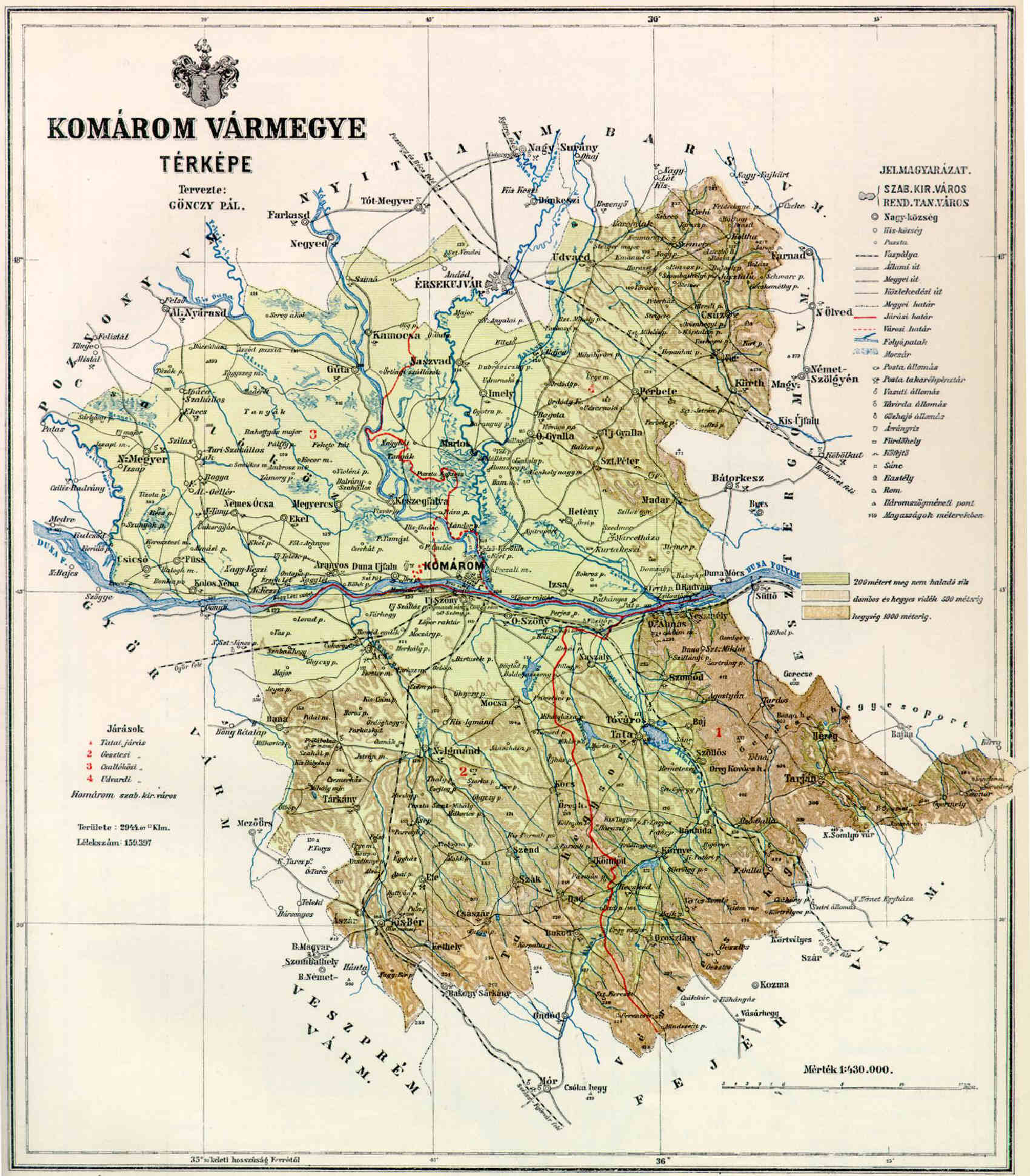
Map of Komárom, 1891.

Komárom County shared borders with the counties of Győr, Pozsony, Nyitra, Bars, Esztergom, Pest-Pilis-Solt-Kiskun, Fejér and Veszprém. The rivers Danube Vág and Nyitra ran through the county. It also covered the eastern part of the island between the Danube and the Little Danube (Slovak Žitný ostrov translates as English: Rye Island, Hungarian: Csallóköz). Around 1910 its area was 2,834 km^{2} (1,094 sq mi).

== Capitals ==
The capital of the county was the Komárom Castle and later the town of Komárom (the town was divided into Komárom-Komárno).

== History ==
The Komárom comitatus arose in the 11th century as one of the first comitatuses of the Kingdom of Hungary. It was situated within a radius of about 20 km around Komárom.

In the aftermath of the revolutions of 1848 in the Austrian Empire Hungary came under military administration and was divided into five military districts. In 1850 Komárom and Esztergom counties were divided along the Danube: the areas north of the river – Komárom's Comorn (Komárom) Land- and Stadtbezirke (land- and city-districts, including the Szőny suburb of Komárom on the southern bank) and Perbete Stuhlbezirk ('seat-district'); Esztergom's Muzsla Stuhlbezirk and a small part of Győr County on the north bank – were combined into a new Komárom county (under the German name Comorn) administered by the Military District of Preßburg; the southern parts of the traditional Komárom and Esztergom counties, including Komárom's Kócs and Dotis Stuhlbezirke, were merged to form a new Gran (Esztergom) county administered by the Military District of Pest-Ofen. The districts were dissolved and traditional counties restored in 1860.

Until the later 19th century the area of Lábatlan and Piszke (now merged with Lábatlan) was an exclave of Komárom county within Esztergom county.

In 1920 the Treaty of Trianon assigned the part of Komárom county north of the Danube to Czechoslovakia (Komárno region). The southern part stayed in Hungary and merged with the southern part of Esztergom county to form Komárom-Esztergom County in 1923. The forming of Czechoslovakia, whose border in the south became the Danube River, separated the seat of the county, Komárom, from its southern half.

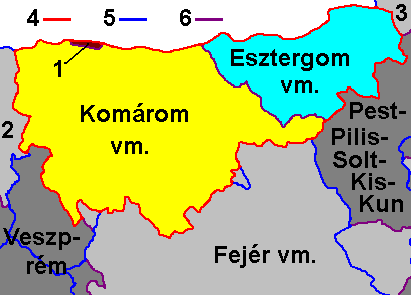
Komárom and Esztergom counties after the Treaty of Trianon. In 1923, the two counties were merged to form Komárom-Esztergom county. (1) that part of the city of Komárom (urban county) that remained in Hungary.

In 1938, the Czechoslovak part became part of Hungary by the First Vienna Award. Komárom county was recreated, which included, besides the territory of pre-1920 Komárom County, most of the Rye Island. After World War II, the pre-war situation was reestablished, but in 1950, the county was renamed to Komárom as the county was rearranged and received some extra territories. This county was renamed to Komárom-Esztergom County in 1990. The part of the former county north of the river Danube is now in Slovakia, is part of the Nitra region and is largely identical with the Komárno district.

The territory to the north of the Danube is part of Slovakia (Nitra region) and is largely identical with the Komárno district. The territory to the south of the Danube is part of Hungary. The town on the northern shore was renamed to Komárno. Komárno and Komárom are today connected by the Elisabeth Bridge.

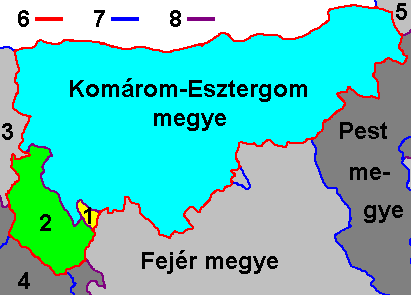
The formation of modern Komárom-Esztergom County. (1) territory assigned from Fejér County to Komárom-Esztergom County in 1950. (2) territory assigned from Veszprém County to Komárom-Esztergom County in 1950.

== Demographics ==
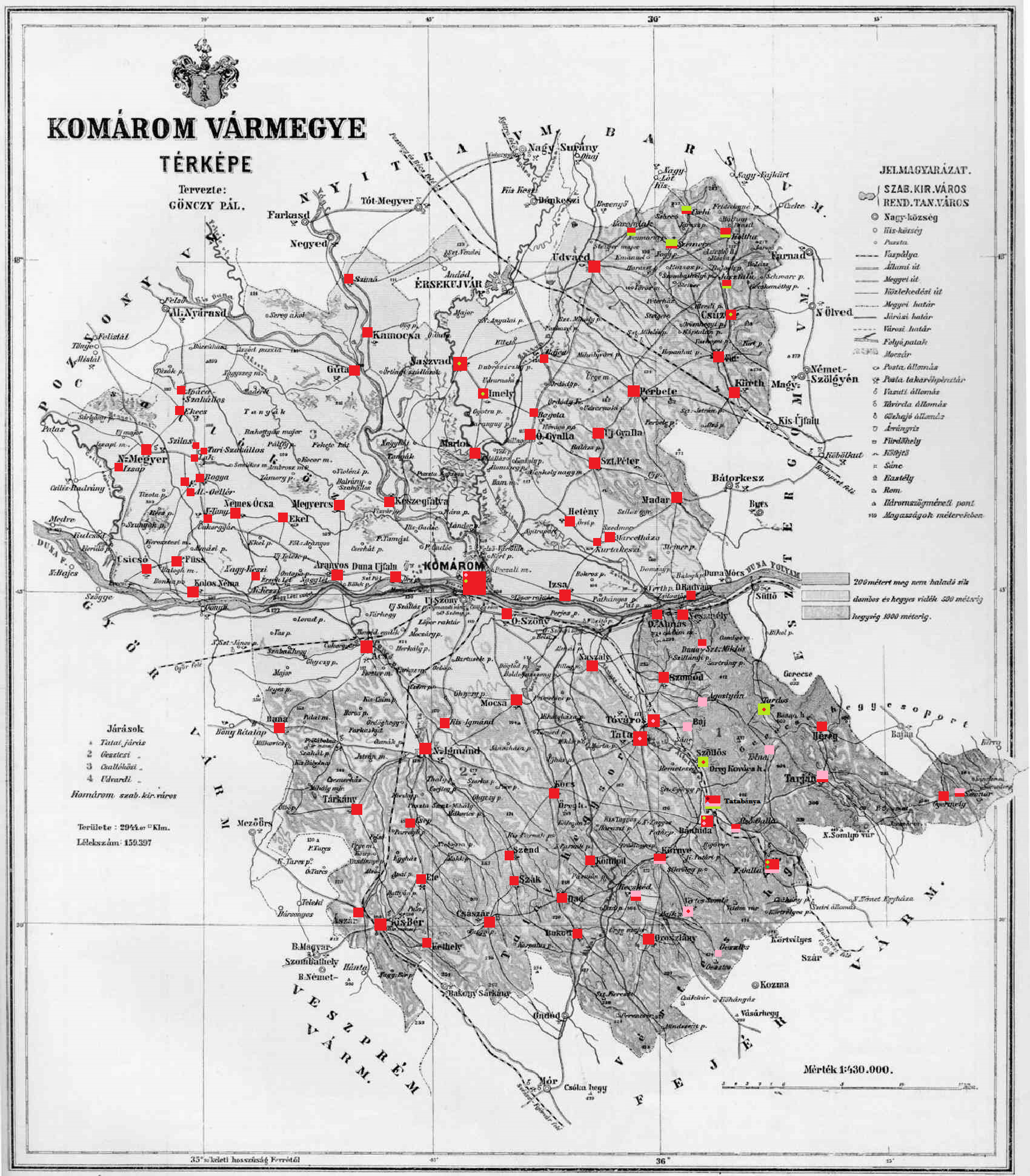
Ethnographic map of the county (with data of the 1910 census). Key: red – Hungarians; pink – Germans; light green – Slovaks. Coloured dots in plain rectangles imply the presence of smaller minority populations (generally more than 100 people or 10%). Multicoloured rectangles imply cities and villages with multi-ethnic populations with the order of the stripes following the ethnic composition of the settlement.

In 1900, the county had a population of 180,024 people and was composed of the following linguistic communities:

Total:

- Hungarian: 155,850 (86.6%)
- German: 12,439 (6.9%)
- Slovak: 10,012 (5.6%)
- Croatian: 144 (0.0%)
- Romanian: 52 (0.0%)
- Serbian: 22 (0.0%)
- Ruthenian: 19 (0.0%)
- Other or unknown: 1,486 (0.8%)

According to the census of 1900, the county was composed of the following religious communities:

Total:

- Roman Catholic: 118,513 (65.8%)
- Calvinist: 48,618 (27.0%)
- Jewish: 7,235 (4.0%)
- Lutheran: 5,376 (3.0%)
- Greek Catholic: 189 (0.1%)
- Greek Orthodox: 53 (0.0%)
- Unitarian: 9 (0.0%)
- Other or unknown: 31 (0.0%)

== Subdivisions ==
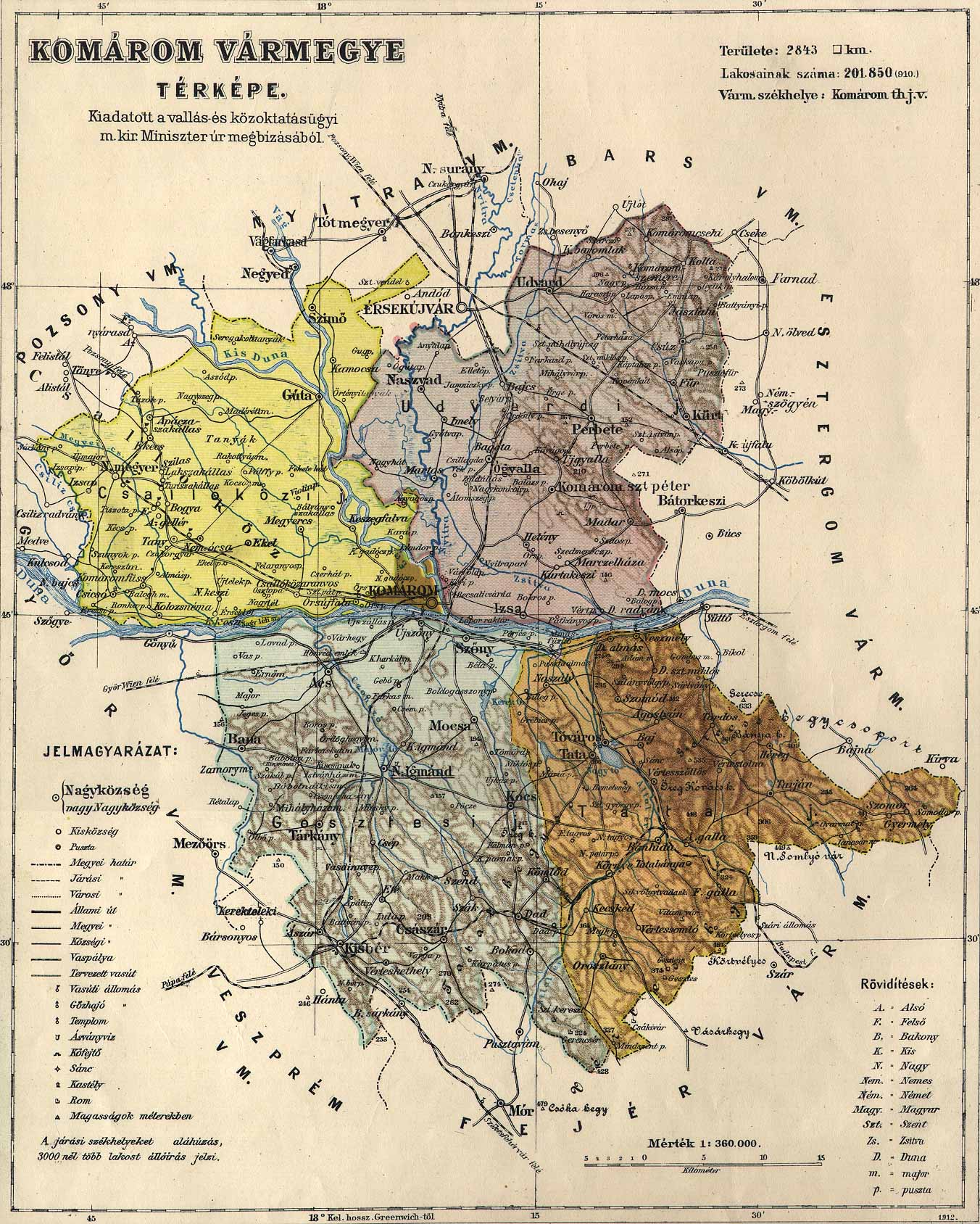

In the early 20th century, the subdivisions of Komárom county were:

Districts (járás)
District	Capital
Csallóköz	Nemesócsa (now Zemianska Olča)
Gesztes	Nagyigmánd
Tata	Tata
Udvard	Ógyalla (now Hurbanovo)
Urban counties (törvényhatósági jogú város)
Komárom, (now divided between Komárom, Hungary and Komárno, Slovakia)

Komárno, Zemianska Olča, Dvory nad Žitavou and Hurbanovo are now in Slovakia.
