= Jagasits =

Hungarian noble family

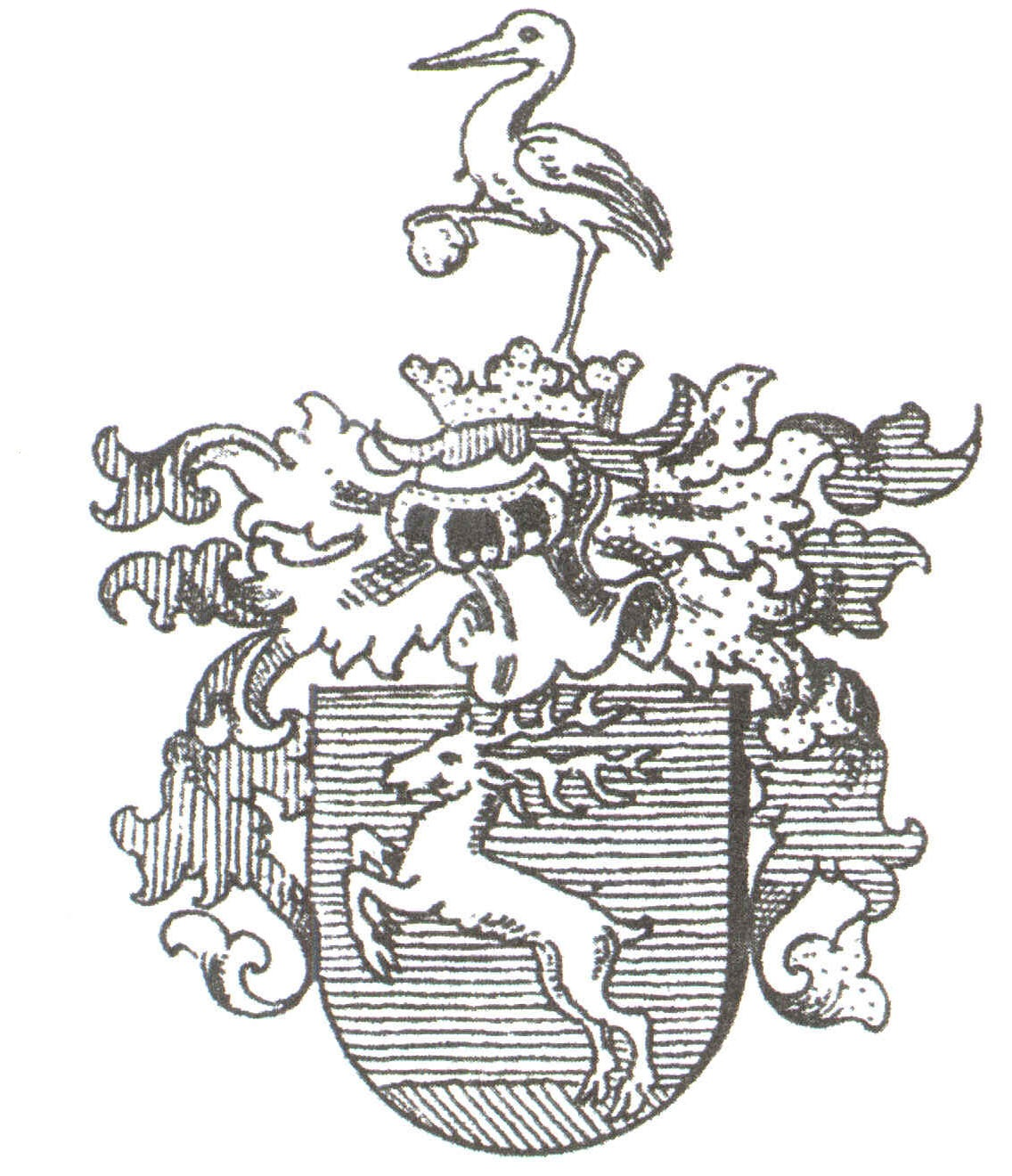
Coat of Arms of Jagasics family

The Jagasits family (Jagasich, Jagasics) was a Hungarian noble family from Zala County, with parts of it in Vas and Esztergom Counties as well. The patent of nobility was issued to János Jagasich and his children (Ferenc, Ádám, László, György, Katalin, Mária-Éva, Julianna) on 28 July 1715 from King Charles III (ruled 1711–1740) and publicly announced in Sopron on 1 October 1715.

== Coat of arms ==
The family's coat of arms is a standing deer on a shield in a blue background with a green field. On the helmet over the shield there's a crane with one of its legs pulled up and holding a stone. The side is silver-red on the right side, gold-blue on the left side.

== Notable members ==
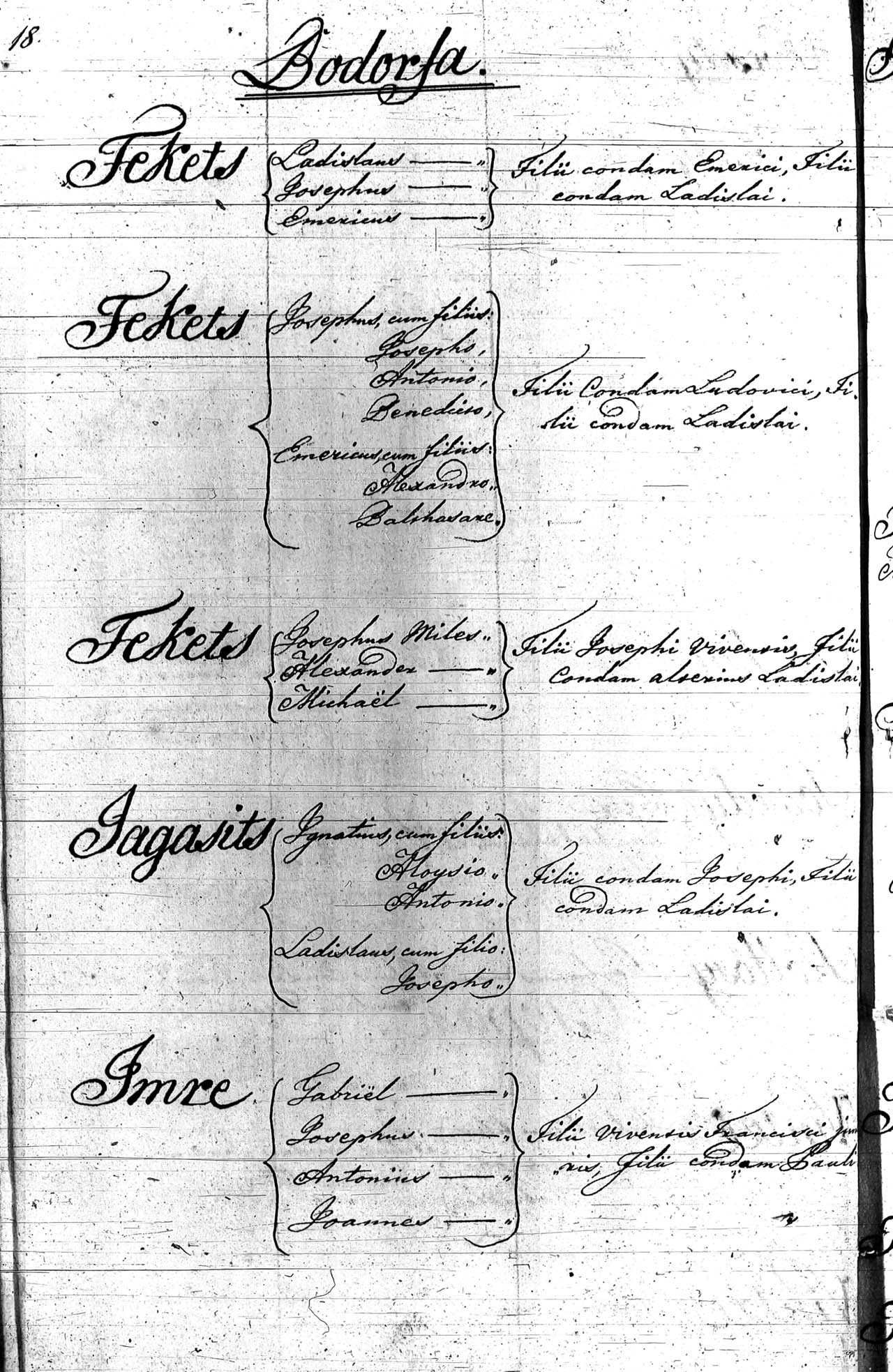
Noble charter

- The son of Ferenc Jagasits was promoted to vice-count of Zala County in 1770.
- Alajos Jagasich became a Salthouse-controller in 1844.
- Sándor Jagasich served as a royal prosecutor at first, then in 1847/48 was the MP for Esztergom County, then from 1850 the Chief of Esztergom County (K.u.K) and member of the Franz Joseph knight's order.

== Sources ==
- Szluha, Márton (2012). Vas vármegye nemes családjai. Vol. I. Heraldika Kiadó. pp. 645–646.
