= Esztergom County =

County of the Kingdom of Hungary

Esztergom County Comitatus Strigoniensis (Latin) Esztergom vármegye (Hungarian) Komitat Gran (German)
- County of the Kingdom of Hungary (10th century-1543, 1690-1786, 1790-1923, 1938-1945)
- Coat of arms

- Capital: Esztergom
- Area
  - Coordinates: 47°48′N 18°45′E
  - 1910: 1,076 km^{2} (415 sq mi)
- Population
  - 1910: 90,800
- History
  - Established: 10th century
  - Ottoman conquest: 1543
  - County recreated: 1690
  - Merged into Esztergom-Komárom County: 1786
  - County recreated: 1790
  - Treaty of Trianon: 20 June 1920
  - Merged into Komárom-Esztergom County: 1923
  - County recreated (First Vienna Award): 2 November 1938
  - Remerged into Komárom-Esztergom County: 1945
- Today part of: Slovakia (544 km^{2}); Hungary (532 km^{2})

Esztergom County (Latin: comitatus Strigoniensis, Hungarian: Esztergom (vár)megye, Slovak: Ostrihomský komitát / Ostrihomská stolica / Ostrihomská župa, German: Graner Gespanschaft / Komitat Gran) was an administrative county of the Kingdom of Hungary, situated on both sides of the Danube river. Its territory is now divided between Hungary and Slovakia. The territory to the north of the Danube is part of Slovakia, while the territory to the south of the Danube is part of Hungary.

== Geography ==
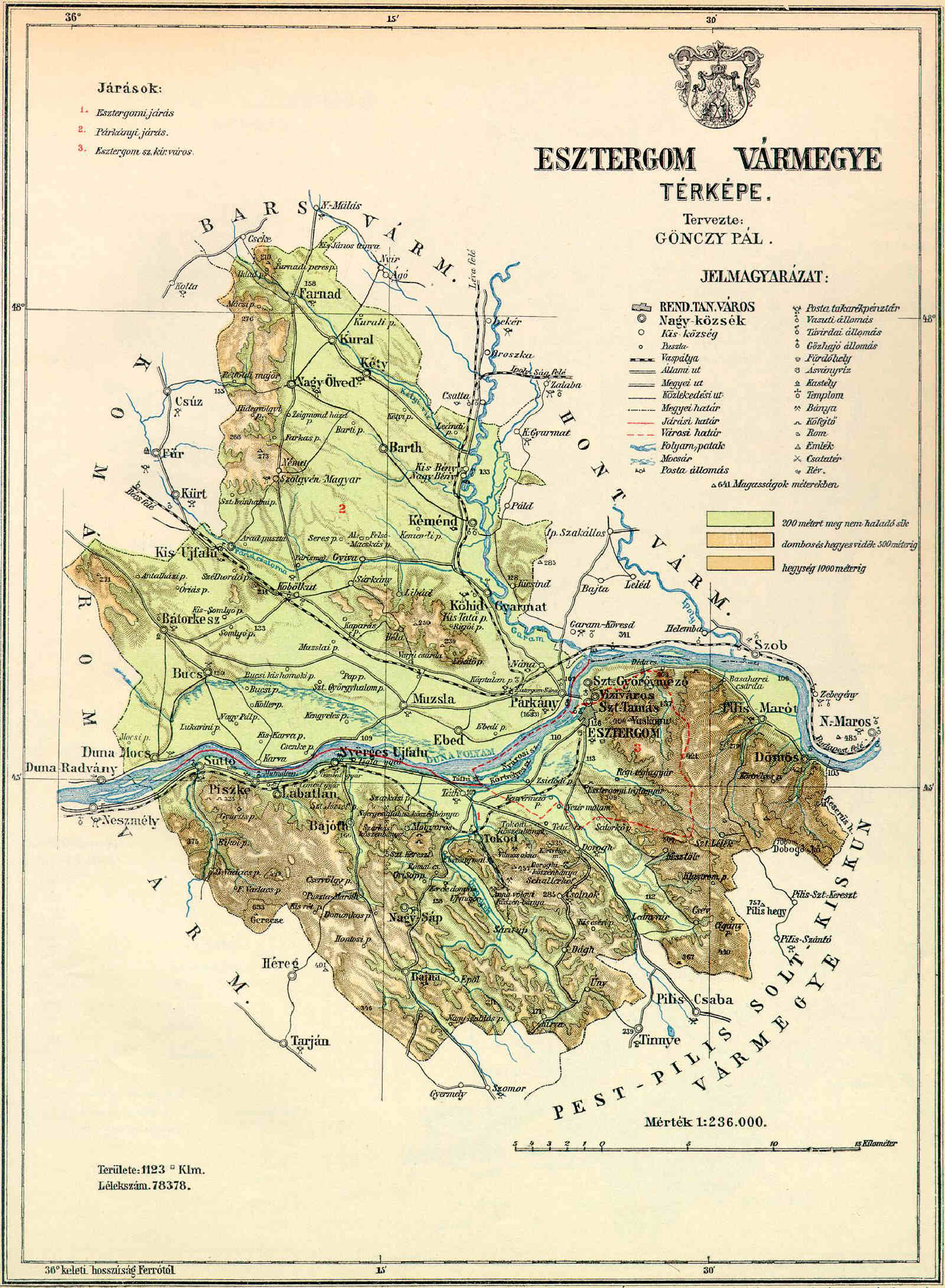
Map of Esztergom, 1891.

Esztergom County shared borders with the counties Bars, Hont, Pest-Pilis-Solt-Kiskun and Komárom. Its territory comprised a 15 km strip to the west of the lower part of the Garam river and continued some 10 km south of the Danube river. Its area was 1076 km^{2} around 1910.

== Capitals ==
The capital of the county was the Esztergom Castle and the town of Esztergom, then from 1543 onwards, when the territory became part of the Ottoman Empire, the county officials fled to Nagyszombat and Érsekújvár, the latter functioning as a seat (e. g. 1605–1663) and finally since 1714 the previous situation was restored.

== History ==
A predecessor of the county existed as early as in the 9th century, when Esztergom (Slovak: Ostrihom) was one of the most important castles of Great Moravia. The Esztergom county as a comitatus arose at the end of the 10th century as one of the first comitatus of the Kingdom of Hungary. The county had a special status in that since 1270 its heads were at the same time the archbishops of Esztergom.

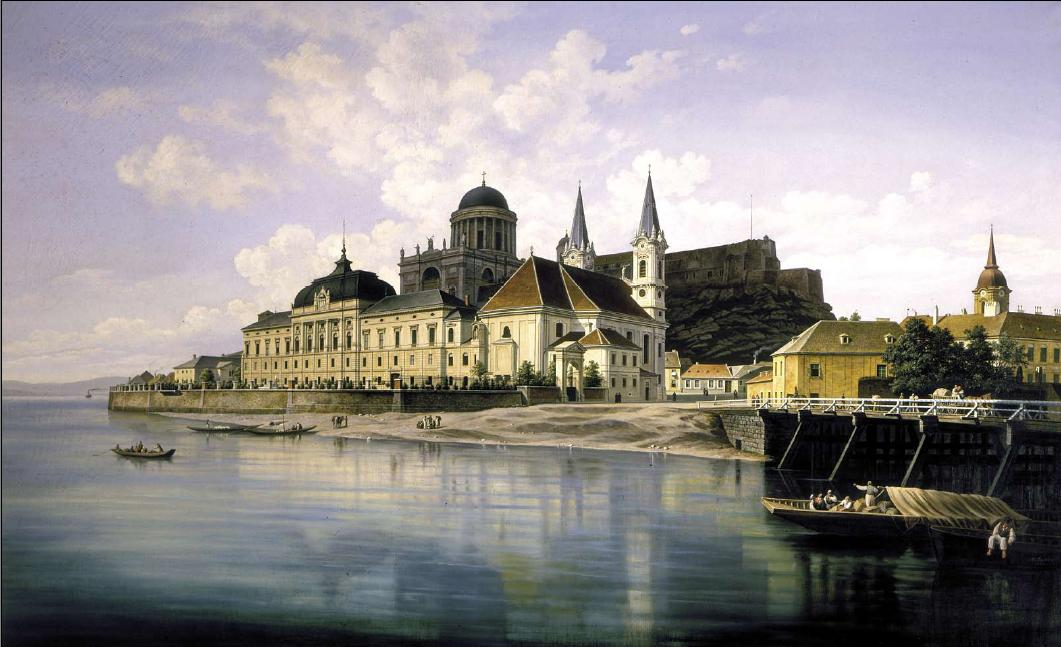
The city of Esztergom in the 19th century

In the aftermath of the revolutions of 1848 in the Austrian Empire Hungary came under military administration and was divided into five military districts. In 1850 Komárom and Esztergom counties were divided along the Danube: the areas north of the river (along with a small part of Győr County on the north bank and the Szőny suburb of Komárom on the southern bank), including Esztergom's Muzsla Stuhlbezirk ('seat-district'), were combined into a new Komárom county (under the German name Comorn) administered by the Military District of Preßburg; the southern parts of the traditional Komárom and Esztergom counties (the Gran (Esztergom) Land- and Stadtbezirke and Komárom's Kócs and Dotis Stuhlbezirke) were merged to form a new Gran (Esztergom) county administered by the Military District of Pest-Ofen. The districts were dissolved and traditional counties restored in 1860.

Until the later 19th century the area of Lábatlan and Piszke (now merged with Lábatlan) was an enclave belonging to Komárom county within Esztergom county.

In the aftermath of World War I, the part of Esztergom county north of the Danube became part of newly formed Czechoslovakia, as recognized by the concerned states in 1920 by the Treaty of Trianon. The southern part remained in Hungary and merged with the southern part of Komárom county to form Komárom-Esztergom County in 1923.

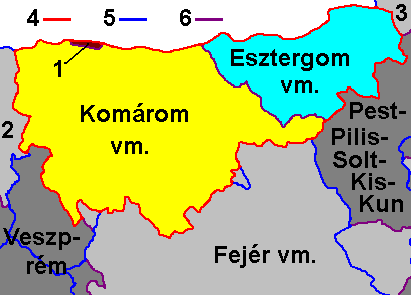
Komárom and Esztergom counties after the Treaty of Trianon. In 1923, the two counties were merged to form Komárom-Esztergom county.

Following the provisions of the First Vienna Award, the Czechoslovak part became again part of Hungary in November 1938. The old Esztergom county was recreated. After World War II, the Trianon borders were reestablished and Komárom-Esztergom County was recreated again. In 1950, it was renamed to Komárom county and received some additional territories. This county was eventually renamed to Komárom-Esztergom county again in 1990. The part of the county north of the river Danube is now in Slovakia and is part of the Nitra region.

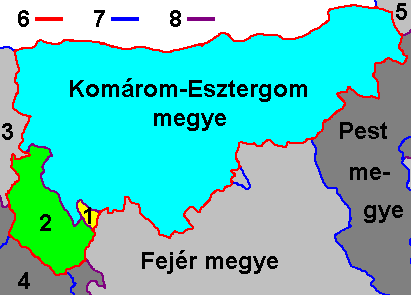
The formation of modern Komárom-Esztergom County. (1) territory assigned from Fejér County to Komárom-Esztergom County in 1950. (2) territory assigned from Veszprém County to Komárom-Esztergom County in 1950.

== Demographics ==
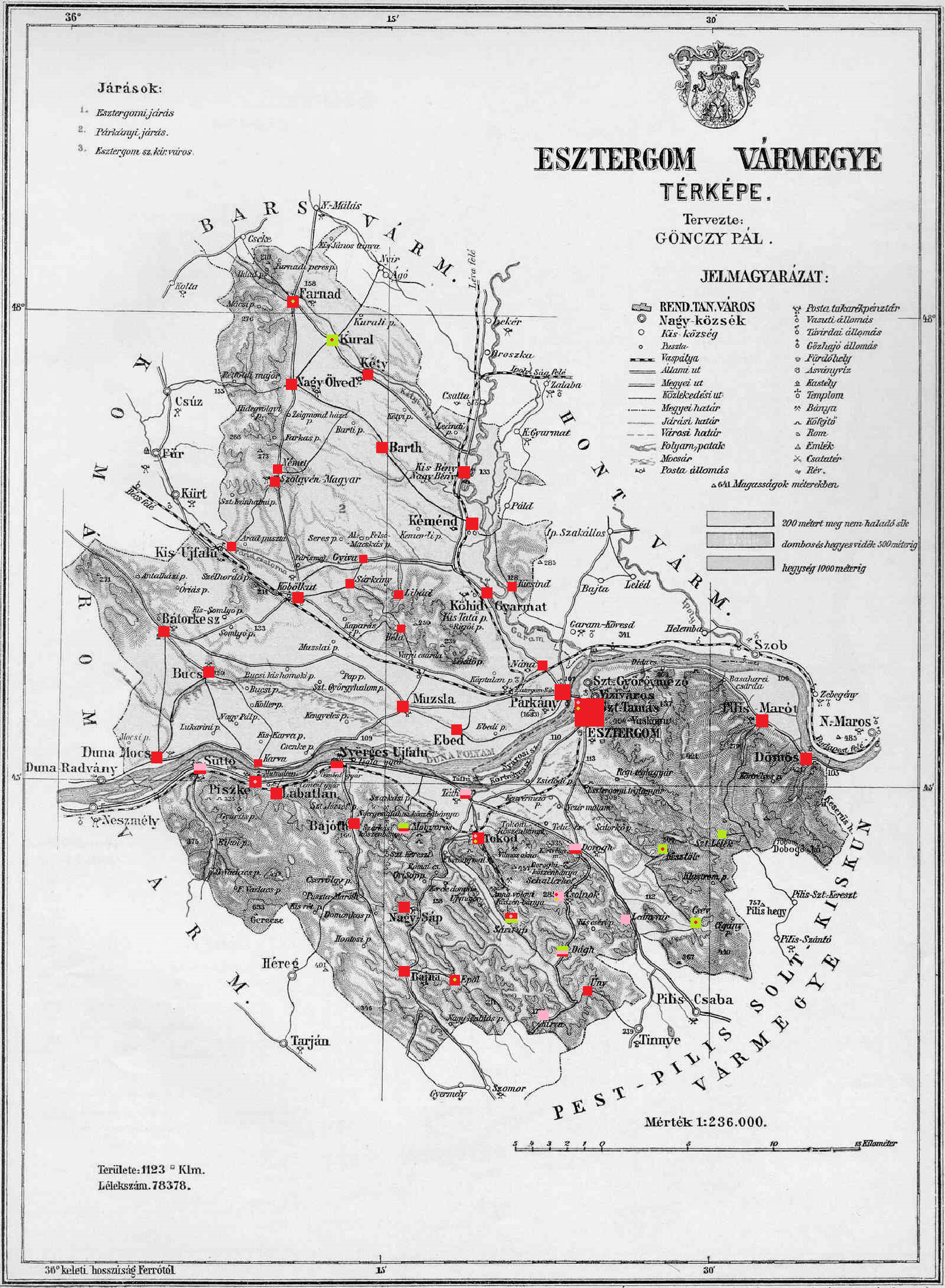
Ethnic map of Esztergom county according to the data of the 1910 census. Key: red - Hungarians; pink - Germans; light green - Slovaks. Coloured dots in a plain rectangle imply the presence of smaller minority populations (generally more than 100 people or 10%). Multicoloured rectangles imply cities and villages with multi-ethnic populations with the order of the stripes following the ethnic composition of the settlement.

In 1900, the county had a population of 87,651 people and was composed of the following linguistic communities:

Total:

- Hungarian: 69,429 (79,2%)
- German: 9,995 (11,4%)
- Slovak: 7,491 (8,6%)
- Croatian: 61 (0,1%)
- Serbian: 15 (0,0%)
- Romanian: 7 (0,0%)
- Ruthenian: 1 (0,0%)
- Other or unknown: 652 (0,7%)

According to the census of 1900, the county was composed of the following religious communities:

Total:

- Roman Catholic: 74,017 (84,4%)
- Calvinist: 9,829 (11,2%)
- Jewish: 2,974 (3,4%)
- Lutheran: 733 (0,8%)
- Greek Catholic: 54 (0,1%)
- Greek Orthodox: 33 (0,1%)
- Unitarian: 6 (0,0%)
- Other or unknown: 5 (0,0%)

== Subdivisions ==
In the early 20th century, the subdivisions of Esztergom county were:

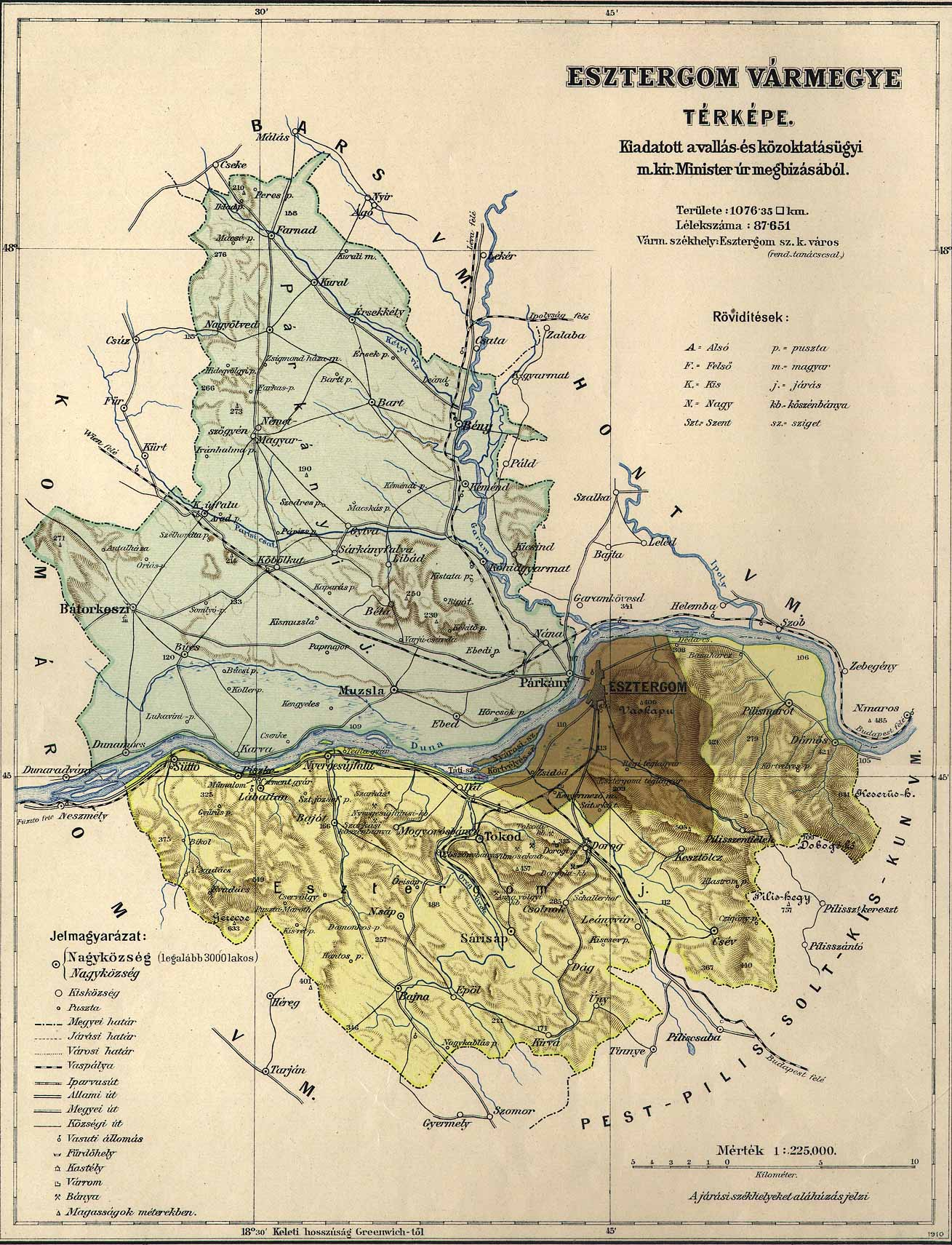

Districts (járás)
District	Capital
Esztergom	Esztergom
Párkány	Muzsla (now Mužla) until 1908, after Párkány (now Štúrovo)
Urban districts (rendezett tanácsú város)
Esztergom

Štúrovo and Mužla are now in Slovakia.

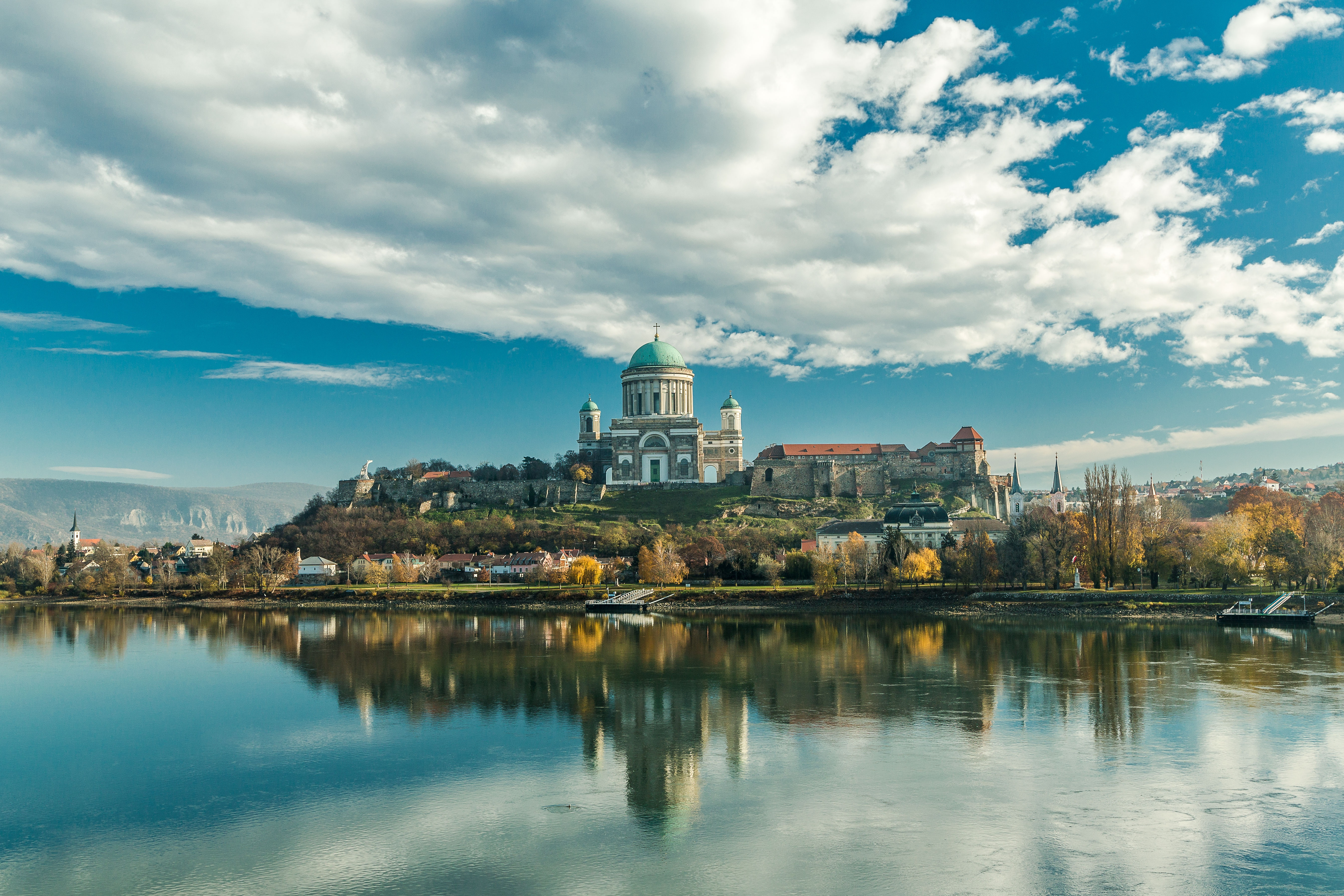
Esztergom Castle Hill panorama from Štúrovo
