= Abov =

Region of Slovakia

Coordinates: 48.61°N 21.145°E

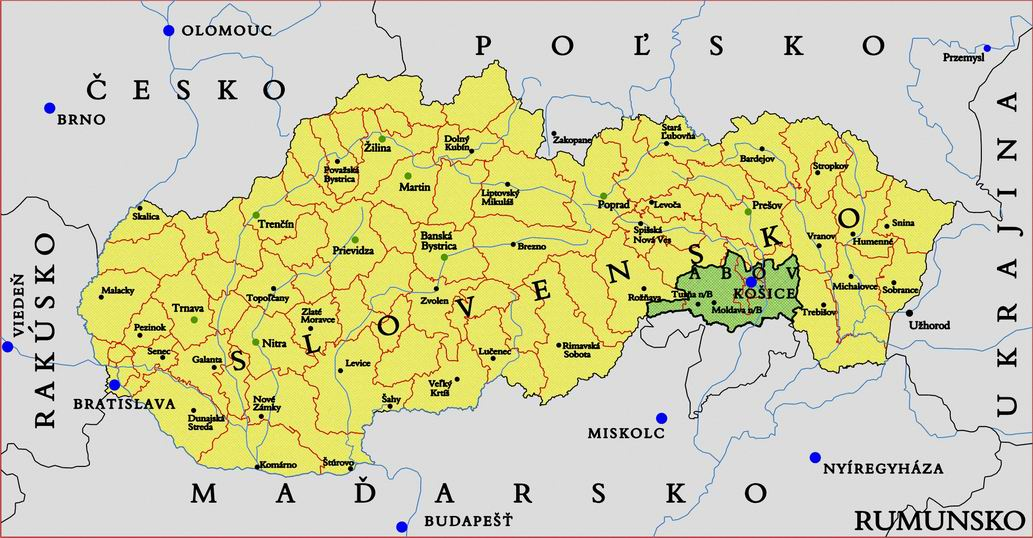
Abov in Slovakia

Abov (Hungarian: Abaúj) is historically the Slovak name of Abaúj County in the Kingdom of Hungary. Today, it is an informal designation of the part of that county situated in Slovakia, as well as the official name of one of Slovakia's tourist regions (situated in that territory). The southern half of the former county is part of modern Hungary.

== Geography ==
Abov is situated some 20 km to both sides along the Hornád river (Hungarian: Hernád) around Košice.

== History ==
The (whole) county arose in the second half of the 13th century from the comitatus Novi Castri (named after Novum Castrum, today Abaújvár), which also included the later counties Sáros and Heves counties. In 1882, the county was merged with the small Torna County and has existed as the Abaúj-Torna county since. This county previously existed temporarily in 1785-1790 and 1848-1859.

In 1920, the northern half of the county (including Košice) became part of newly formed Czechoslovakia and continued to exist as an administrative unit till 1922 (Abovskoturnianska župa).

By the First Vienna Award most of the Czechoslovak part of the county was returned to Hungary and added to the county of Abaúj-Torna, with Košice (Hungarian: Kassa) as capital. After World War II, the pre-war border was restored.

== See also ==
List of traditional regions of Slovakia
