= Abaúj-Torna County =

County of the Kingdom of Hungary

Coordinates: 48.28°N 21.19°E

Abaúj-Torna County Comitatus Abaujvariensis et Tornensis (Latin) Abaúj-Torna vármegye (Hungarian) Komitat Abaúj-Torna (German) Abovsko-turnianska župa (Slovak)
- County of the Kingdom of Hungary
- 1850–1860; 1881–1945
- Coat of arms

- Capital: Kassa; Szikszó (1920-1938)
- Area
  - 1910: 3,223 km^{2} (1,244 sq mi)
  - 1930: 1,672 km^{2} (646 sq mi)
- Population
  - 1910: 202,288
  - 1930: 91,428
- History
  - First establishment: 13 September 1850
  - Traditional counties of Hungary restored: October 1860
  - Re-established: 1881
  - Treaty of Trianon: 4 June 1920
  - First Vienna Award: 2 November 1938
  - Pre-WWII partition restored; Hungarian part renamed Abaúj County: 1945
  - Treaty of Paris; pre-war border formally restored: 10 February 1947
- Today part of: Hungary (1,672 km^{2}); Slovakia (1,551 km^{2})
- Košice is the current name of the capital.

Abaúj-Torna (Slovak: Abov-Turňa, German: Abaujwar-Tornau, Latin: comitatus Abaujvar-Tornensis) was an administrative county (comitatus) of the Kingdom of Hungary. Its capital was Kassa (present-day Košice). Its territory is now divided between Hungary and Slovakia.

== Geography ==
Around 1910, Abaúj-Torna county shared borders with Gömör-Kishont, Szepes, Sáros, Zemplén and Borsod counties. The rivers Hernád and Bódva flowed through the county. Its area was 3,223 km^{2} (1,244 sq mi) around 1910.

== History ==
The county Abaúj-Torna was a combination of Abaúj and Torna counties.

Its first creation was during the period of military dictatorship and centralisation in the Kingdom of Hungary following the Hungarian Revolution of 1848, existing from 13 September 1850 until the restoration of the traditional counties of Hungry in October 1860. It formed part of the District of Kaschau during this period.

The two counties were joined a second time in 1881.

In the aftermath of World War I, the northern part of Abaúj-Torna county became part of newly formed Czechoslovakia (as Abovskoturnianska župa), as recognized by the concerned states in the 1920 Treaty of Trianon. It continued to exist as an administrative unit until 1922. The southern half stayed in Hungary as the county Abaúj-Torna, with capital Szikszó.

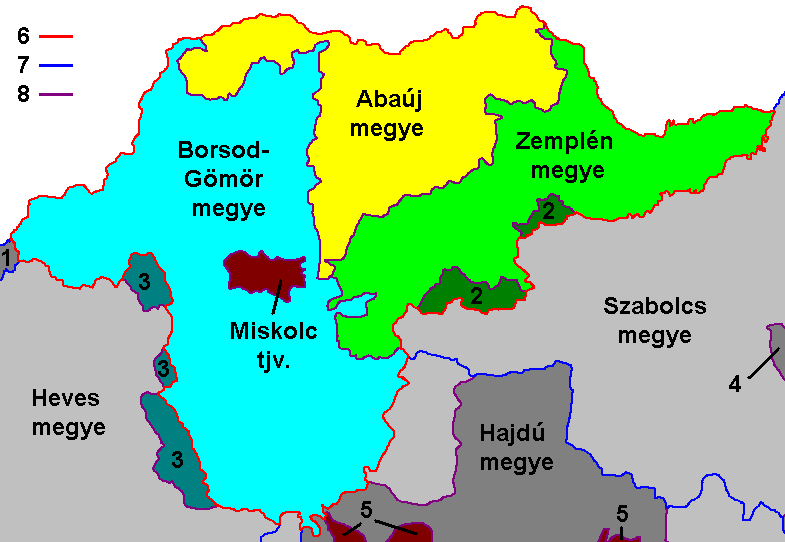
The territories merged in 1950 to form the modern Borsod-Abaúj-Zemplén County. Post-war Abaúj county is shown in yellow.

Following the provisions of the First Vienna Award, most of the Czechoslovak part was returned to Hungary in November 1938. It was added to the county of Abaúj-Torna, with capital Kassa (present-day Košice). After World War II, the Trianon border was restored and the county was renamed to Abaúj County. In 1950, it merged with the county of Borsod-Gömör and the Hungarian part of Zemplén to form the present Borsod-Abaúj-Zemplén county. Since 1993, when Czechoslovakia was split, the northern part of the county's former territory has been part of Slovakia's Košice Region.

== Demographics ==
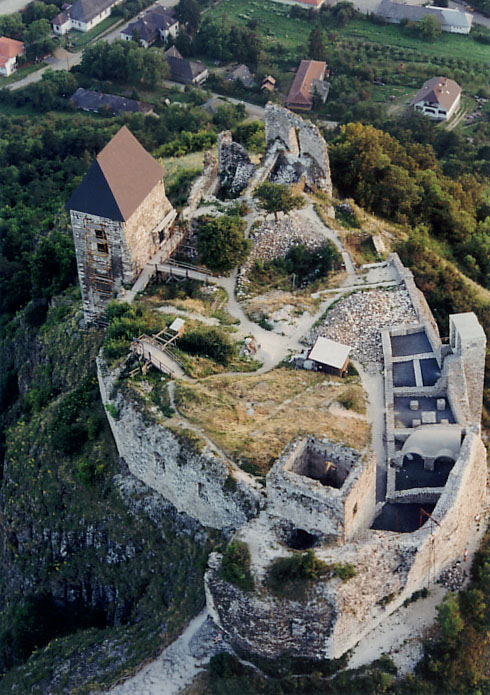
Aerial Photo: Füzér – Castle

In 1900, the county had a population of 196,462 people and was composed of the following linguistic communities:

Total:

- Hungarian: 140,050 (71.3%)
- Slovak: 45,072 (22.9%)
- German: 8,734 (4.5%)
- Ruthenian: 519 (0.3%)
- Croatian: 74 (0.0%)
- Romanian: 60 (0.0%)
- Serbian: 13 (0.0%)
- Other or unknown: 1,940 (1.0%)

According to the census of 1900, the county was composed of the following religious communities:

Total:

- Roman Catholic: 113,447 (57.7%)
- Calvinist: 41,562 (21.2%)
- Greek Catholic: 20,142 (10.3%)
- Jewish: 14,069 (7.2%)
- Lutheran: 7,101 (3.6%)
- Greek Orthodox: 106 (0.0%)
- Unitarian: 18 (0.0%)
- Other or unknown: 17 (0.0%)

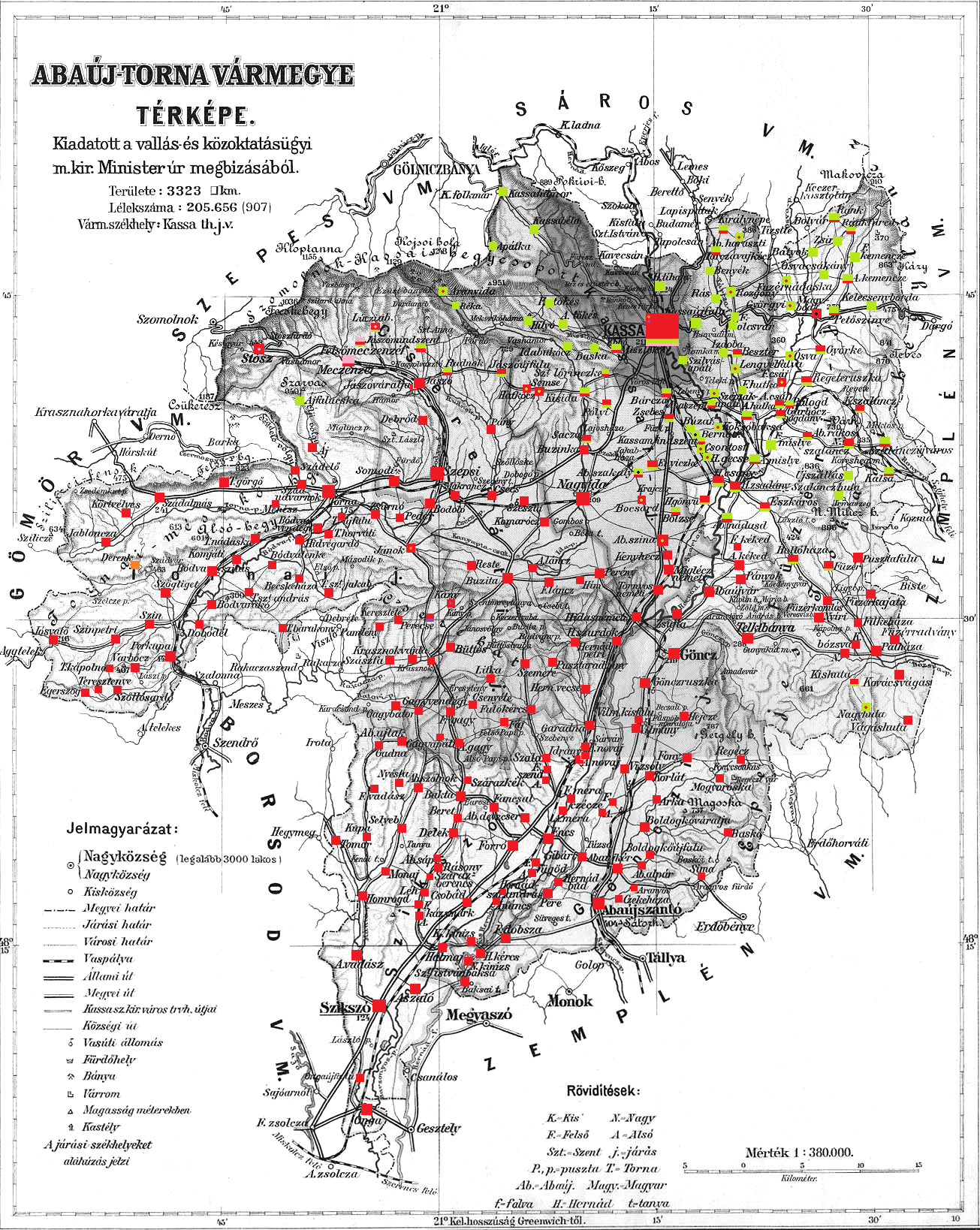
Ethnic map of the county with data of the 1910 census (see the key in the description)

In 1910, the county had a population of 202,288 people and was composed of the following linguistic communities:

Total:

- Hungarian: 156,668 (77.5%)
- Slovak: 36,067 (17.8%)
- German: 6,520 (3.2%)
- Ruthenian: 378 (0.2%)
- Romanian: 127 (0.0%)
- Croatian: 63 (0.0%)
- Serbian: 21 (0.0%)
- Other or unknown: 2,444 (1.2%)

According to the census of 1910, the county was composed of the following religious communities:

Total:

- Roman Catholic: 118,179 (58.4%)
- Calvinist: 42,728 (21.1%)
- Greek Catholic: 20,089 (9.9%)
- Jewish: 14,251 (7.1%)
- Lutheran: 6,832 (3.4%)
- Greek Orthodox: 161 (0.0%)
- Unitarian: 24 (0.0%)
- Other or unknown: 24 (0.0%)

In 1941: 203,438 Hungarians, 18,879 Slovaks, 2581 Bunjevacs, 904 Germans, 623 Roma, 256 Ruthenians, 72 Romanians, 3 Croatians, 105 other; 140,377 Roman Catholics, 45,384 Protestants, 22,476 Greek Catholics, 14,764 Jewish, 4773 Evangelicals, 339 Greek Orthodox, 116 Baptists and 55 Unitarians.

== Subdivisions ==
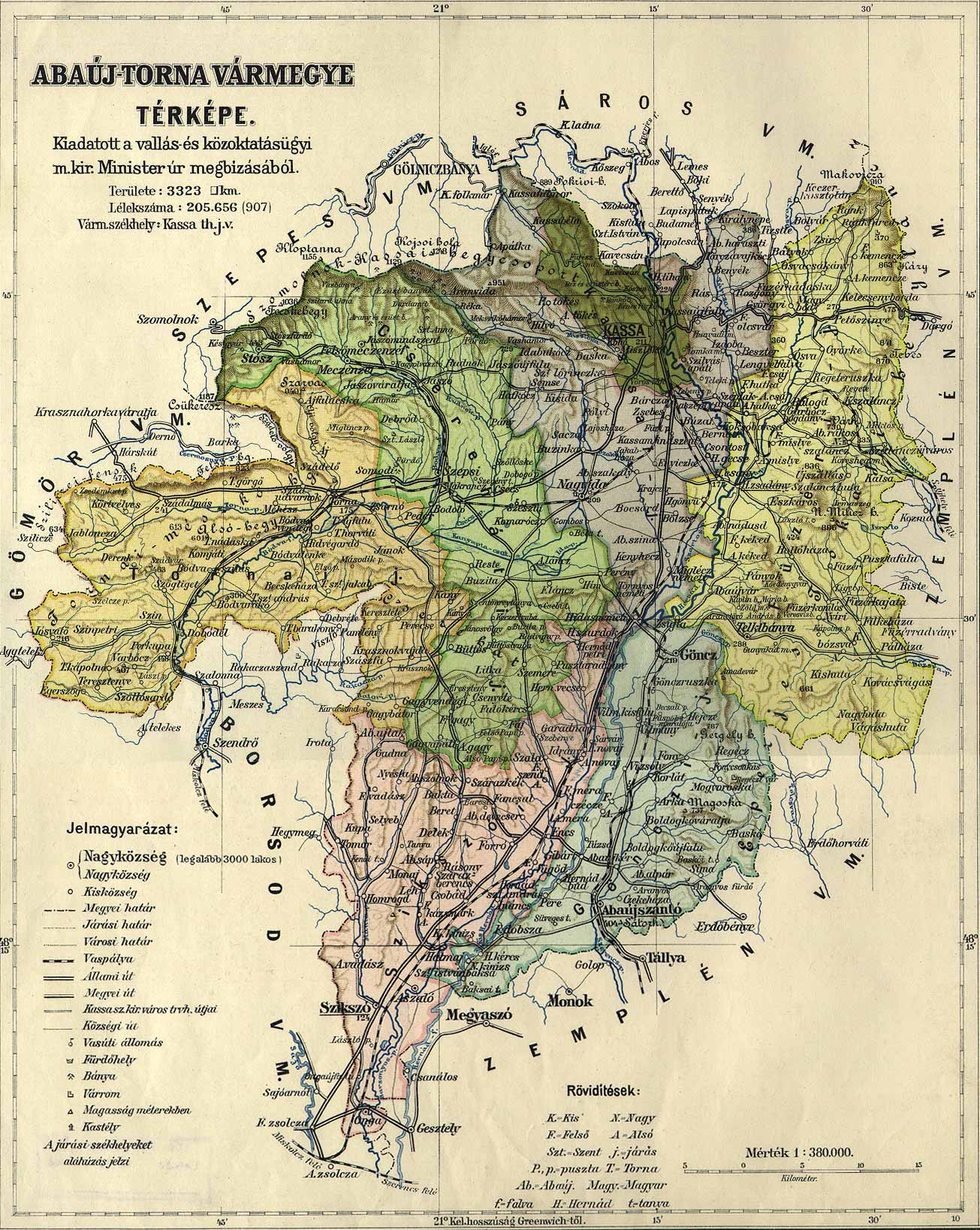

In the early 20th century, the subdivisions of Abaúj-Torna were:

Districts (járás)
District	County seat
Cserehát	Szepsi
Füzér	Hernádzsadány
Gönc	Abaújszántó
Kassa	Kassa
Szikszó	Szikszó
Torna	Torna
Urban counties (törvényhatósági jogú város)
Kassa

The towns Füzér, Szikszó, Gönc and Abaújszántó are now in Hungary.

== See also ==
- Abaúj
- Abov
- Turňa
