= Military District of Ödenburg =

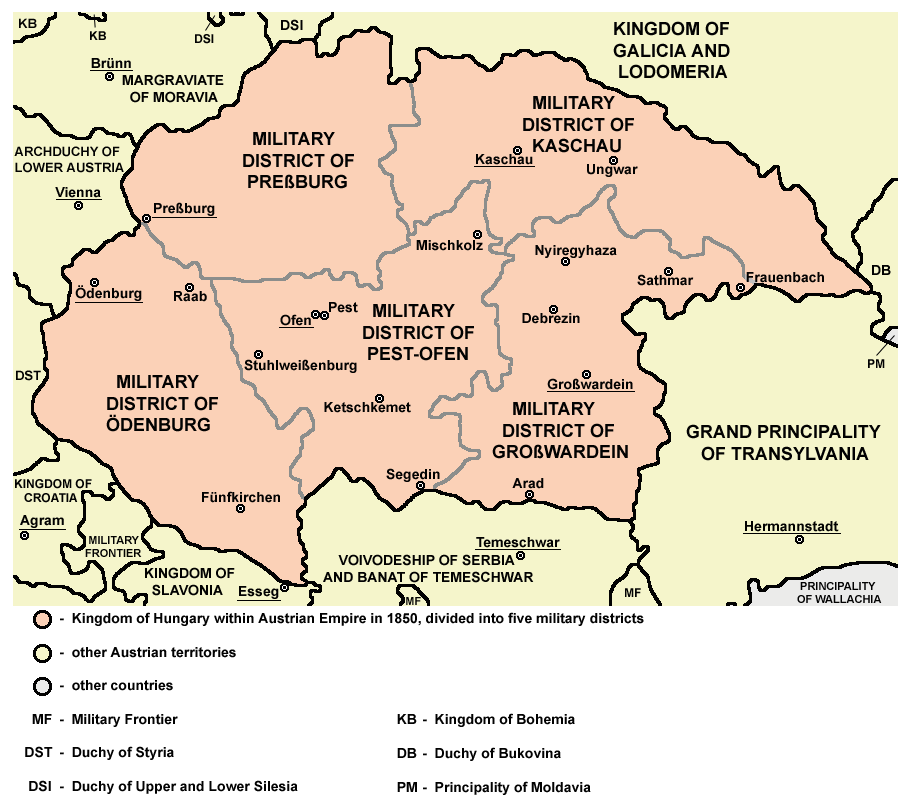
Kingdom of Hungary in 1850

The Military District of Ödenburg was one of the administrative units of the Habsburg Kingdom of Hungary from 1850 to 1860. The seat of the district was Ödenburg (Sopron). It included parts of present-day Hungary, Austria, Croatia, and Slovenia.

== See also ==
- Administrative divisions of the Kingdom of Hungary
