= Military District of Kaschau =

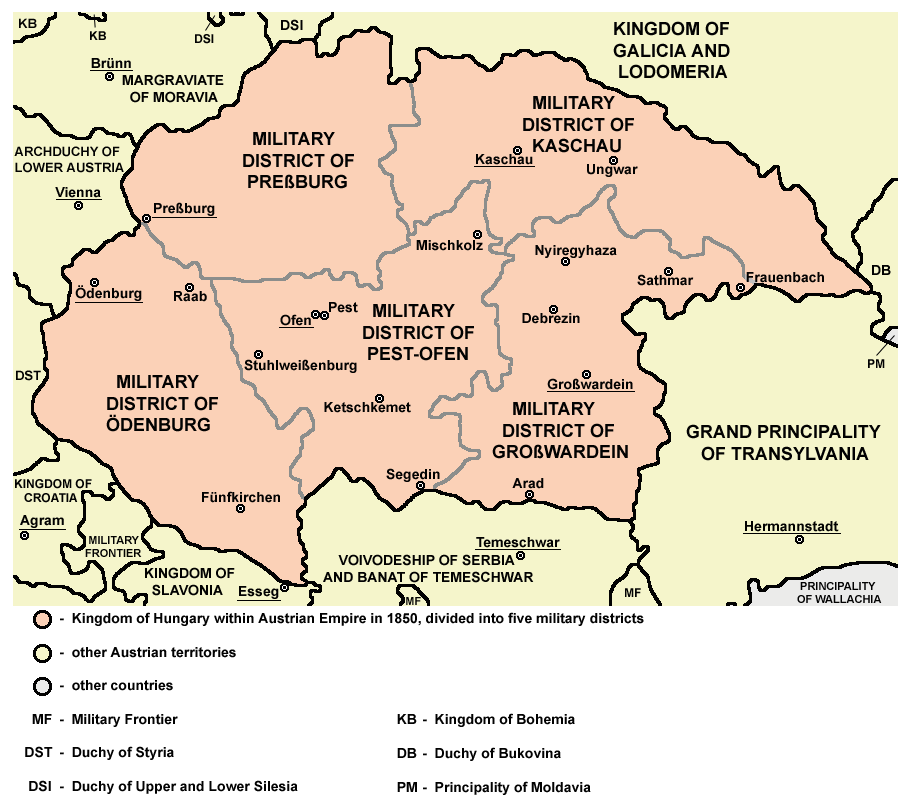
Kingdom of Hungary in 1850

The Military District of Kaschau was one of the administrative units of the Habsburg Kingdom of Hungary from 1850 to 1860. The seat of the district was Kaschau (Kassa, Cassovia, now Košice). It included territories of present-day Slovakia, Hungary and Ukraine.

== See also ==
- Administrative divisions of the Kingdom of Hungary
