= Abaúj County =

County of the Kingdom of Hungary

Coordinates: 48.28°N 21.19°E

The coat of arms of Abaúj.

Abaúj (Latin: comitatus Abaujvariensis, Slovak: Abov, German: Neuburg or Abaujwar) is a historic administrative county (comitatus) of the Kingdom of Hungary. In parts of the 19th century, and in the beginning of the 20th century, it was united with Torna County to form Abaúj-Torna (Slovak: Abov-Turňa) county. Its territory is now in eastern Slovakia and north-eastern Hungary. Today Abaúj and Abov are only informal designations of the corresponding territories in Hungary and Slovakia.

== Geography ==
Abaúj was situated some 20 km on both sides along the Hornád (Hungarian: Hernád) river between (including) Košice and (excluding) Miskolc.

Abaúj shared borders with the Comitatus Scepusiensis (Hungarian: Szepes, German: Zips, Slovak: Spiš), Comitatus Sarossiensis (Hungarian: Sáros, Slovak: Šariš), Comitatus Zempliniensis (Hungarian: Zemplén, Slovak: Zemplín), Comitatus Borsodiensis (Hun: Borsod) and Comitatus Tornensis (Hungarian: Torna, Slovak: Turňa).

== Capitals ==
Initially, the capital of the county was Forró. From the late 16th century the capital was Gönc, and Cassovia (Hungarian: Kassa, Slovak: Košice) has been the center of the county since the late 14th century.

== History ==
According to Anonymus, during the reign of St. Stephen the Aba family (the family of Sámuel Aba who later became king) had properties in this area.

The county arose in the second half of the 13th century from the comitatus Novi Castri (named after Novum Castrum, "new castle" – the castle itself stood in the center of the present-day village Abaújvár), which also included the later counties Šariš (Hungarian: Sáros) and Heves.

During the Mongol invasion of Hungary a large part of the county was destroyed, but the castle of Abaújvár wasn't occupied by the invaders. After the invasion King Béla IV repopulated the area with German settlers.

During the reign of the last kings of the Árpád dynasty (late 13th century) Abaúj was de facto ruled by the Aba (family) (Slovak:Omodejovci). Certain parts of the county was taken away from them after the Battle of Rozgony (June 15, 1312) by King Charles Robert.

In a tax register from 1427 the county is mentioned as having 5187 peasant houses; 3500 in 1494–95. Before the battle of Mohács – marking the beginning of a 160-year-long Ottoman occupation of Hungary – the county had 9 castles, 14 towns, 318 villages and was owned by 275 landlords.

In the 16th-17th century many important historical events took place at least partly in Abaúj county, including the peasant revolt led by György Dózsa (1514), and battles between the Hungarians and the Ottomans. The southern part of the county fell under Ottoman rule, while the northern part remained part of the Kingdom of Hungary.

On 5 September 1619, the prince of Transylvania, Gabriel Bethlen captured Košice in Abauj with the assistance of the future George I Rákóczi in another anti-Habsburg insurrection. By the Peace of Nikolsburg in 1621, the Habsburgs restored the religious toleration agreement of 1606 and recognized Transylvanian rule over the seven Partium countries: Ugocsa, Bereg, Zemplen, Borsod, Szabolcs, Szatmar and Abauj. The county again belonged to the Principality of Transylvania between 1644 and 1648.

Battles were also fought in the county in the early 18th century, during the revolutions led by Imre Thököly and Francis II Rákóczi. The Abaúj county was first merged with the neighbouring, smaller County of Torna (Slovak: Turňa) county in 1785, at the order of Joseph II, but they were separated again in 1790. After the 1848-49 revolution had been suppressed, Abaúj and Torna were merged again, but were separated in 1859. They were finally merged in 1882. Before the merging Abaúj had an area of 2872,71 km^{2} and a population of 166,666; Torna had an area of 618,04 km^{2} and a population of 23,176.

In 1919(?) Abaúj-Torna had 364 villages, of which only 5 had a population larger than 2000. Of the 63 counties of the Kingdom, it was the 45th largest by area, 37th largest by population and 35th by population density (65/km^{2} in 1910).

Between 1899 and 1913 many of people left the Kingdom of Hungary and emigrated to other countries; from Abaúj 44,258 people emigrated, 13,566 migrated back to Hungary; in total it had 30,692 émigrés, making it the 8th largest emigration source of all counties.

In 1918 (confirmed by the Treaty of Trianon 1920), the northern half of the Abaúj-Torna county (1551 km^{2}, including Kassa/Košice) became part of newly formed Czechoslovakia and continued to exist as an administrative unit till October 26, 1922, under the name Abovskoturnianska župa. The southern half became part of modern Hungary as the county Abaúj-Torna, with capital Szikszó. The Hungarian part was divided into four districts.

During World War II Czechoslovakia was split and on November 2, 1938, most of the Czechoslovak part of the county (1257 km^{2} with a population of 126,050, including Kassa with an area of 93 km^{2} and a population of 58,090) became part of Hungary under the First Vienna Award, and was added to the county Abaúj-Torna, with the capital Kassa. On March 6, 1939, the Czechoslovak-Hungarian Border Committee annexed five more villages to Hungary at the request of the residents. After World War II, on January 20, 1945, the pre-war border was restored, with 52% of the original territory remaining in Hungary under the name of Abaúj county, with Szikszó as capital.

During the administrative reform of 1950 in Hungary, Abaúj was merged with the remaining parts of neighbouring counties Borsod-Gömör and Zemplén to form the present Borsod-Abaúj-Zemplén county.

== Historical population ==
| 1787 | 1828 | 1869 | 1890* | 1900** | 1910 | 1941 |
| 114,833 | 158,833 | 144,924 | 151,000 | 156,218 | 202,288 | 228,389 |

* Including Kassa (pop. 28,884), which, as a city with municipal rights, was de jure not part of the county

** incl. Kassa (35,586)

== Subdivisions ==
In the early 20th century, the subdivisions of the county Abaúj-Torna were:

Districts (járás)
| District | Capital |
|---|---|
| Abaújszántó | Abaújszántó |
| Bódvaszilas | Bódvaszilas |
| Gönc | Gönc |
| Szikszó | Szikszó |

== See also ==
- Abov

== Sources ==
- Hungarian Catholic Lexicon (Hungarian only) (articles: Abaúj vármegye, Abaúj-Torna vármegye and Borsod-Abaúj-Zemplén megye.)
