= Heves County (former) =

Administrative county in the Kingdom of Hungary

Heves County Comitatus Hevesiensis (Latin) Heves vármegye (Hungarian) Komitat Hewesch (German)
- County of the Kingdom of Hungary (13th century–1526); County of the Eastern Hungarian Kingdom (1526–1540); County of the Kingdom of Hungary (1540–1596); County of the Kingdom of Hungary (1687–1765, 1850–1860, 1876–1946)
- Coat of arms

- Capital: Eger
- Area
  - Coordinates: 47°54′N 20°22′E
  - 1910: 3,761 km^{2} (1,452 sq mi)
- Population
  - 1910: 279,700
- History
  - Established: 13th century
  - Ottoman conquest: 1596
  - County recreated: 1687
  - Merged to Heves-Külső-Szolnok County: 1765
  - County recreated: 13 September 1850
  - Traditional counties (incl. Heves-Külső-Szolnok) restored: October 1860
  - County recreated: 1876
  - Monarchy abolished: 1 February 1946
- Today part of: Hungary

Heves was an administrative county in the Kingdom of Hungary. Its territory, which is now in northern Hungary, was slightly larger than that of present Heves county. The capital of the county was Eger.

== Geography ==
Heves county shared borders with the Hungarian counties Pest-Pilis-Solt-Kiskun, Nógrád, Gömör-Kishont, Borsod, Hajdú and Jász-Nagykun-Szolnok. It stretched from the Mátra and Bükk mountains to and across the river Tisza. Its area was 3,761 km^{2} (1,452 sq mi) around 1910.

== History ==
Heves county was formed in the 13th century. The territory of Heves was conquered by the Ottomans in 1596 (see Ottoman Hungary) and formed part of the Ottoman Eğri Eyalet until it was retaken by the Habsburg Kingdom of Hungary in 1687.

In 1765 it was merged with Külső-Szolnok County; due to the occupation the latter could not maintain its administration (the justice system had already been merged in 1569).

Following the failed Hungarian Revolution of 1848 a period of military dictatorship and centralisation began in Hungary. Heves-Külső-Szolnok was re-partitioned on 13 September 1850 into Heves and Szolnok counties. The border between Heves and Szolnok mostly followed the Tisza river. As of 1853 Heves comprised the Land- and Stadtbezirke of Erlau (Eger) and the Stuhlbezirke of Pétervásár, Heves, and Gyöngyös. Both counties formed part of the District of Pest-Ofen during this period. The traditional counties of Hungary, including Heves-Külső-Szolnok, were restored in October 1860.

Heves County was recreated again in the newly arranged Hungarian county system of 1876. Its territory after 1876 was broadly similar to its 1850s iteration but with the addition of Tisza-Füred south of the Tisza.

After World War II, the territory of the county was modified: the region around Pásztó became part of Nógrád county, the area on the left bank of the Tisza (Tiszafüred) became part of Jász-Nagykun-Szolnok county, and an area north of Eger was transferred from Borsod-Abaúj-Zemplén county.

== Demographics ==
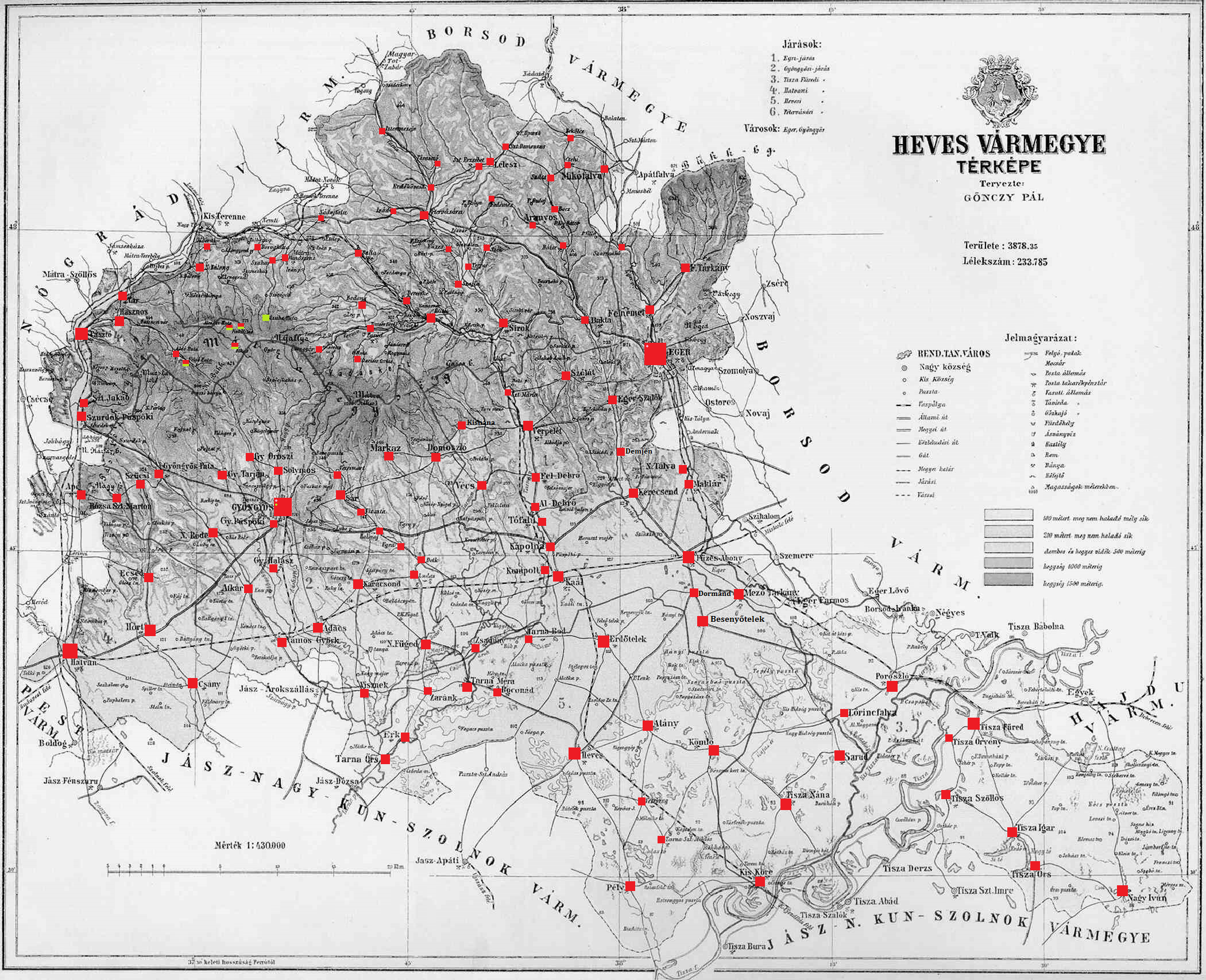
Ethnic map of the county with data of the 1910 census (see the key in the description).

Population by mother tongue (Note: Only linguistic communities > 1% are displayed.)
Census	Total	Hungarian	Other or unknown
1880	208,420	196,724 (98.40%)	3,193 (1.60%)
1890	233,785	230,450 (98.57%)	3,335 (1.43%)
1900	255,345	252,840 (99.02%)	2,505 (0.98%)
1910	279,700	277,378 (99.17%)	2,322 (0.83%)

Population by religion (Note: Only religious communities > 1% are displayed.)
Census	Total	Roman Catholic	Calvinist	Jewish	Other or unknown
1880	208,420	179,690 (86.22%)	16,654 (7.99%)	10,916 (5.24%)	1,160 (0.56%)
1890	233,785	203,963 (87.24%)	17,798 (7.61%)	10,873 (4.65%)	1,151 (0.49%)
1900	255,345	225,113 (88.16%)	18,628 (7.30%)	10,320 (4.04%)	1,284 (0.50%)
1910	279,700	248,778 (88.94%)	18,929 (6.77%)	10,244 (3.66%)	1,749 (0.63%)

== Subdivisions ==
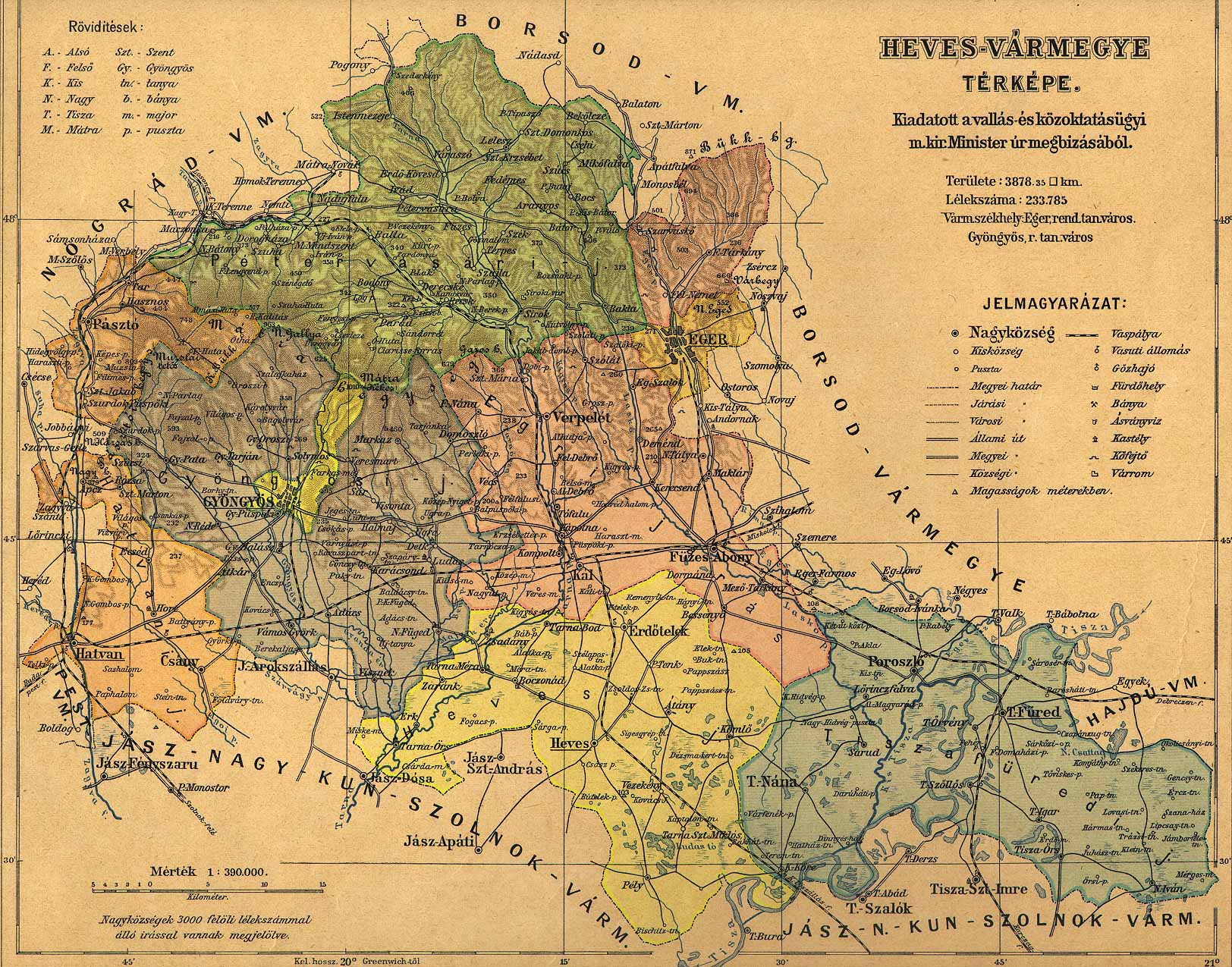

In the early 20th century, the subdivisions of Heves county were:

Districts (járás)
District	Capital
Eger	Eger
Gyöngyös	Gyöngyös
Hatvan	Hatvan
Heves	Heves
Pétervására	Pétervására
Tiszafüred	Tiszafüred
Urban districts (rendezett tanácsú város)
Eger
Gyöngyös
