= Military District of Preßburg =

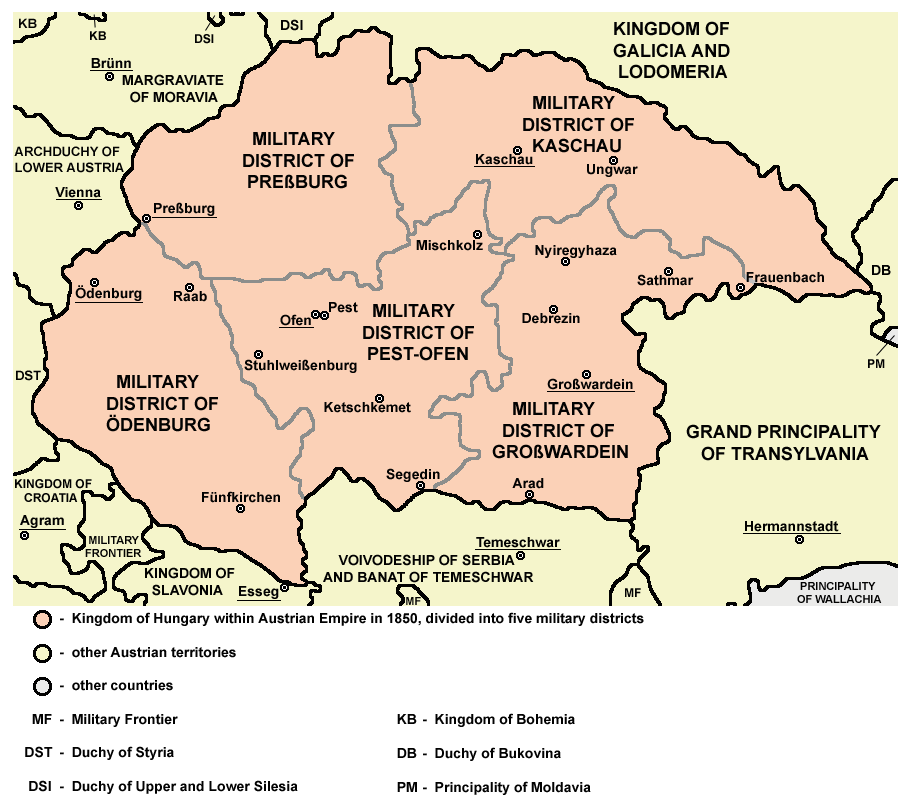
Kingdom of Hungary in 1850

The Military District of Preßburg was one of the administrative units of the Habsburg Kingdom of Hungary from 1850 to 1860. The seat of the district was Preßburg (Pozsony, now Bratislava). It included western parts of present-day Slovakia and northern parts of present-day Hungary.

== See also ==
- Administrative divisions of the Kingdom of Hungary
