= Pribeta =

Pribeta Perbete
- Municipality
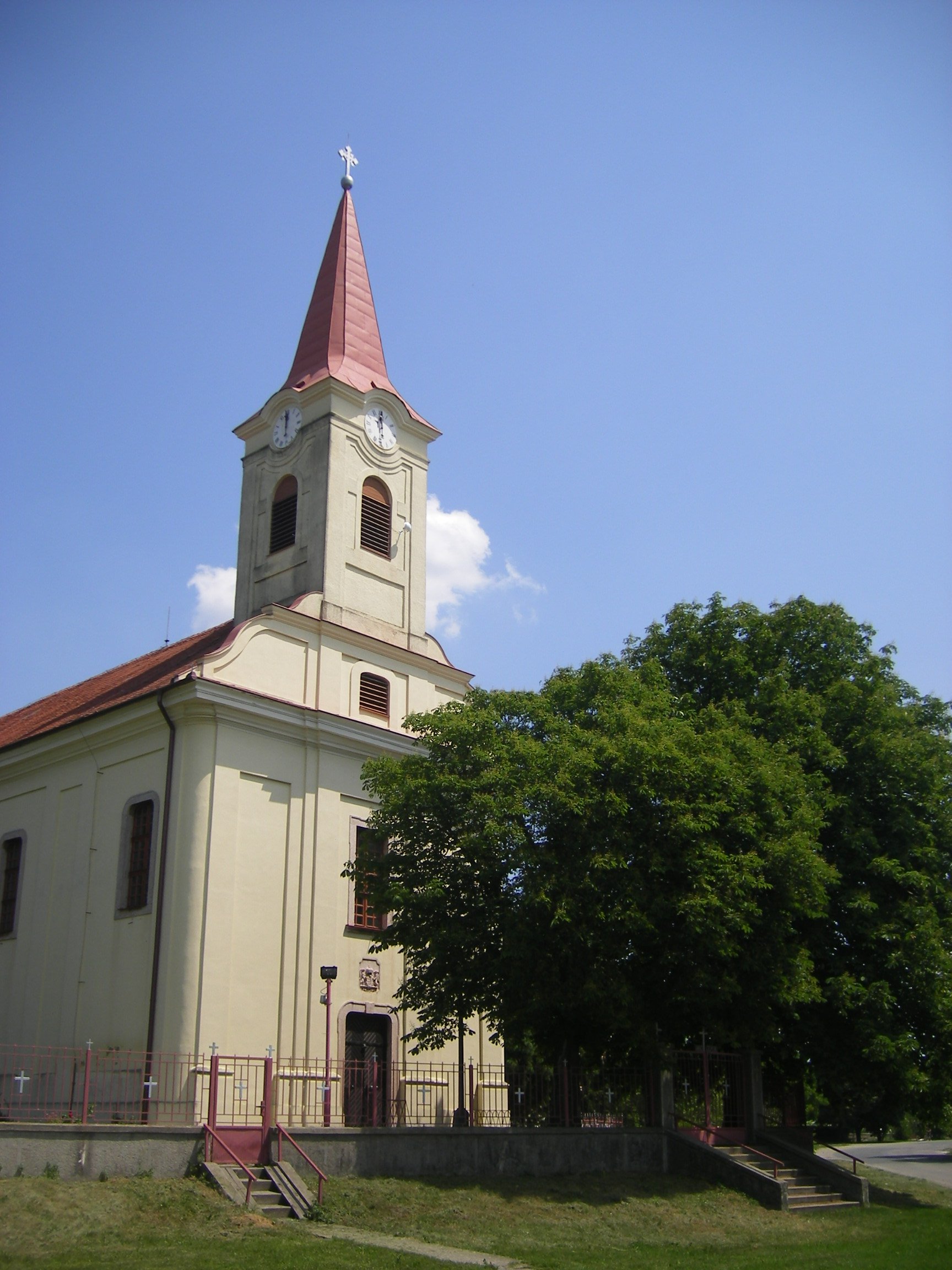
- Holy Trinity church in Pribeta

- Flag Coat of arms

- Location of Pribeta in the Nitra Region Location of Pribeta in Slovakia
- Coordinates: 47°54′00″N 18°18′47″E
- Country: Slovakia
- Region: Nitra Region
- District: Komárno District
- First mentioned: 1312

Government
  - Mayor: Norbert Zsitva (Szövetség–Aliancia)

Area
  - Total: 42.79 km^{2} (16.52 sq mi)
- Elevation: 135 m (443 ft)

Population (2025)
  - Total: 2,590
- Time zone: UTC+1 (CET)
  - Summer (DST): UTC+2 (CEST)
- Postal code: 946 55
- Area code: +421 35
- Vehicle registration plate (until 2022): KN
- Website: www.pribeta.sk

Pribeta (Hungarian: Perbete, Hungarian pronunciation:[ˈpɛrbɛtɛ]) is a village and municipality in the Komárno District in the Nitra Region of south-west Slovakia. In 2001 it had 3137 inhabitants of which 2403 Hungarian and 713 Slovak. The village was annexed to Czechoslovakia in 1920.

== Geography ==
Pribeta is located 24 km from Komarno on road, in an area with hills. It is here that two main roads intersect. 589 (connecting Komarno with Kolta) and 509 (connecting Bajc with Sturovo). Pribeta possesses a railway station in Dvor Mikulas, which is a suburb 3 km north from the village on the road towards Dubnik.

There are two Pusztas within the village's area Michalovo and Pribetapuszta.

The municipality lies at an altitude of 135 metres (443 ft) and covers an area of 42.79 km^{2} (16.52 sq mi) (2025).

== History ==
In the 9th century, the territory of Pribeta became part of the Kingdom of Hungary. In historical records the village was first mentioned in 1312. After the Austro-Hungarian army disintegrated in November 1918, Czechoslovak troops occupied the area, later acknowledged internationally by the Treaty of Trianon. Between 1938 and 1945 Pribeta once more became part of Miklós Horthy's Hungary through the First Vienna Award. From 1945 until the Velvet Divorce, it was part of Czechoslovakia. Since then it has been part of Slovakia.

== Population ==
Population statistic (10 years)
Year	1995	2005	2015	2025
Count	3186	3039	2884	2590
Difference		−4.61%	−5.10%	−10.19%

Population statistic
Year	2024	2025
Count	2635	2590
Difference		−1.70%

It has a population of 2590 people (31 December 2025).

=== Ethnicity ===
Census 2021 (1+ %)
Ethnicity	Number	Fraction
Hungarian	1938	70.6%
Slovak	798	29.07%
Not found out	182	6.63%
Romani	36	1.31%
Total	2745	

In year 2021 was 2745 people by ethnicity 1938 as Hungarian, 798 as Slovak, 182 as Not found out, 36 as Romani, 4 as Czech, 4 as Other, 2 as Italian, 2 as Serbian, 1 as Jewish, 1 as Polish and 1 as German.

Note on population: The difference values of population numbers in the table "Population statistic" and in the sections "Ethnicity" & "Religion" is caused by the use of various statistical methods.

=== Religion ===
Census 2021 (1+ %)
Religion	Number	Fraction
Roman Catholic Church	1569	57.16%
Calvinist Church	551	20.07%
None	294	10.71%
Evangelical Church	138	5.03%
Not found out	129	4.7%
Total	2745	

In year 2021 was 2745 people by religion 1569 from Roman Catholic Church, 551 from Calvinist Church, 294 from None, 138 from Evangelical Church, 129 from Not found out, 15 from Jehovah's Witnesses, 15 from Greek Catholic Church, 8 from Old Catholic Church, 7 from Baptists Church, 6 from Other and not ascertained christian church, 4 from Christian Congregations in Slovakia, 3 from United Methodist Church, 1 from Jewish community, 1 from Eastern Orthodox Church, 1 from Islam, 1 from Other, 1 from Church of the Brethren and 1 from Ad hoc movements.

== Facilities ==
The village has a public library, a gym and a football pitch.
