= Kocs =

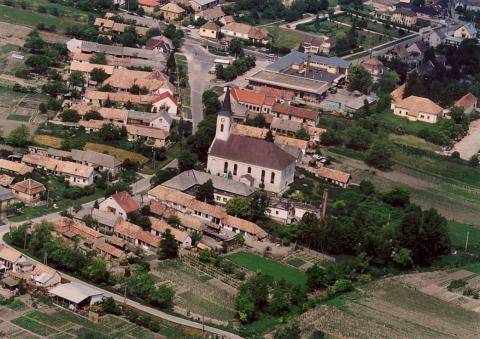
- Aerial view of Kocs

- Flag Coat of arms

- Location of Komárom-Esztergom county in Hungary

- Location of Kocs
- Coordinates: 47.60668°N 18.21536°E
- Country: Hungary
- Region: Central Transdanubia
- County: Komárom-Esztergom
- District: Tata

Area
  - Total: 58.32 km^{2} (22.52 sq mi)

Population (2025)
  - Total: 2,654
  - Density: 43.07/km^{2} (111.6/sq mi)
- Time zone: UTC+1 (CET)
  - Summer (DST): UTC+2 (CEST)
- Postal code: 2898
- Area code: 34
- Motorways: M1
- Distance from Budapest: 76.3 km (47.4 mi) East

Kocs (Hungarian: [kot͡ʃ]) is a village in Komárom-Esztergom county, Hungary. It lies west of Tata and 65 km (40 mi) northwest of Budapest. A site of horse-drawn vehicle manufacture from the 1400s, the name is the source of the word coach and its equivalent in other languages.

== History ==
During the reign of King Matthias Corvinus in the 1400s, the wheelwrights of Kocs began to build a cart with steel-spring suspension. This "cart of Kocs" as the Hungarians called it (kocsi szekér) soon became popular all over Europe. The spread of the kocsi szekér has been linked by some theories personally to the king of Hungary Ferdinand I, the younger brother of Charles V who became the king of Spain, Emperor of Germany, and lord of the Burgundian Netherlands, in the 16th century, and who promoted the comfortable, spring-suspended wagons among the wealthy European nobility.

A 16th-century German depiction of a kocsi without springs puts this theory in doubt, however, and it is uncertain whether the springs or some other feature were responsible for the spread of the word throughout Europe. The Thurn-und-Taxis-Post, the imperial post service, employed the first horse-drawn mail coaches in Europe since Roman times in 1650 –, as they started in the town of Kocs the use of these mail coaches gave rise to the term "coach". In contemporary colloquial Hungarian the word "kocsi" is most often used to mean "car".

The coat of arms of the town, in addition to displaying a ram and the Árpád stripes, also depicts an early model cart or wagon that refers to the wheelwrights' successful industry.

== Notable people from Kocs ==
- Mór Kóczán (1885–1972), athlete and Calvinist pastor
- Zoltán Székely (1903–2001), violinist and composer

== Gallery ==
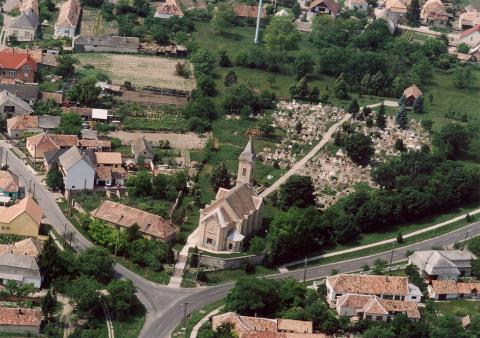

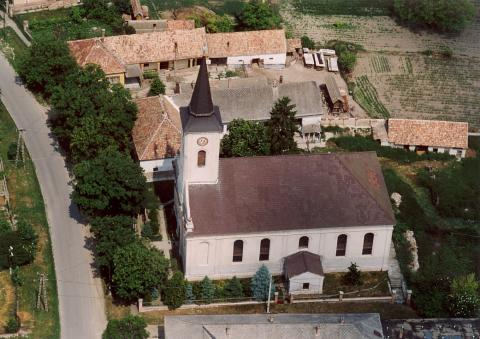

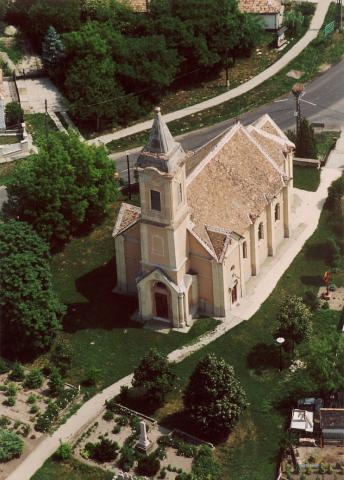
