= Military District of Pest-Ofen =

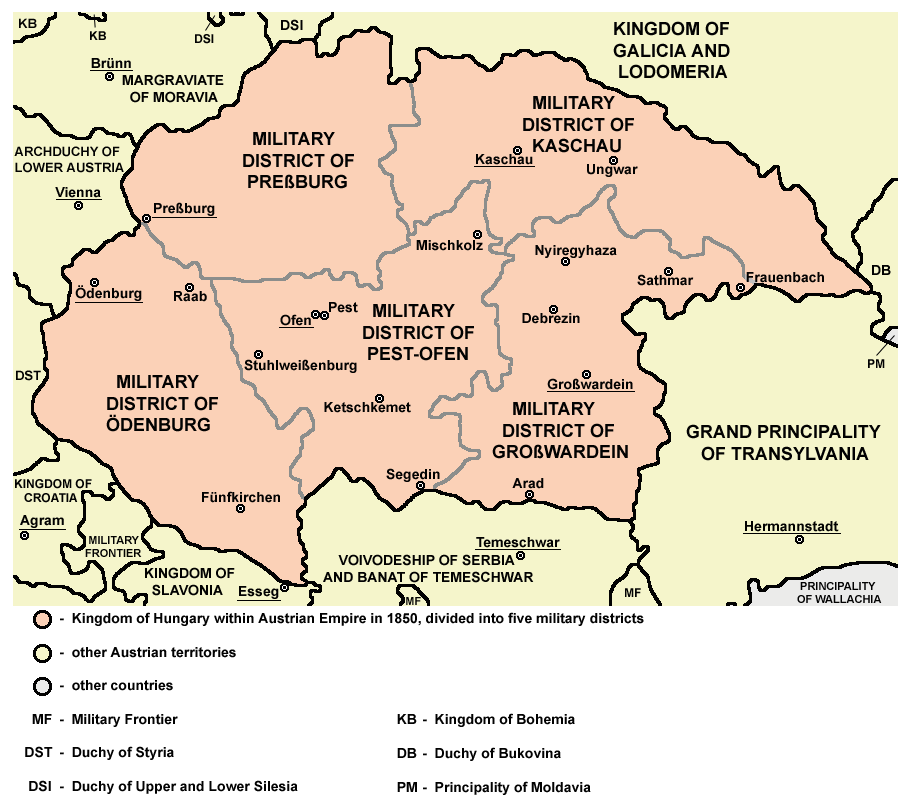
Kingdom of Hungary in 1850

The Military District of Pest-Ofen was one of the administrative units of the Habsburg Kingdom of Hungary from 1850 to 1860. The seat of the district was Ofen (Buda). It included central parts of present-day Hungary.

== See also ==
- Administrative divisions of the Kingdom of Hungary
