= Kunság =

Historical Cuman region of central Hungary

Kunság (Cumania); Jászkunság (Jazygia-Cumania)
- autonomous entity of the Kingdom of Hungary
- 1279–1876
- Banner (1618) Coat of arms

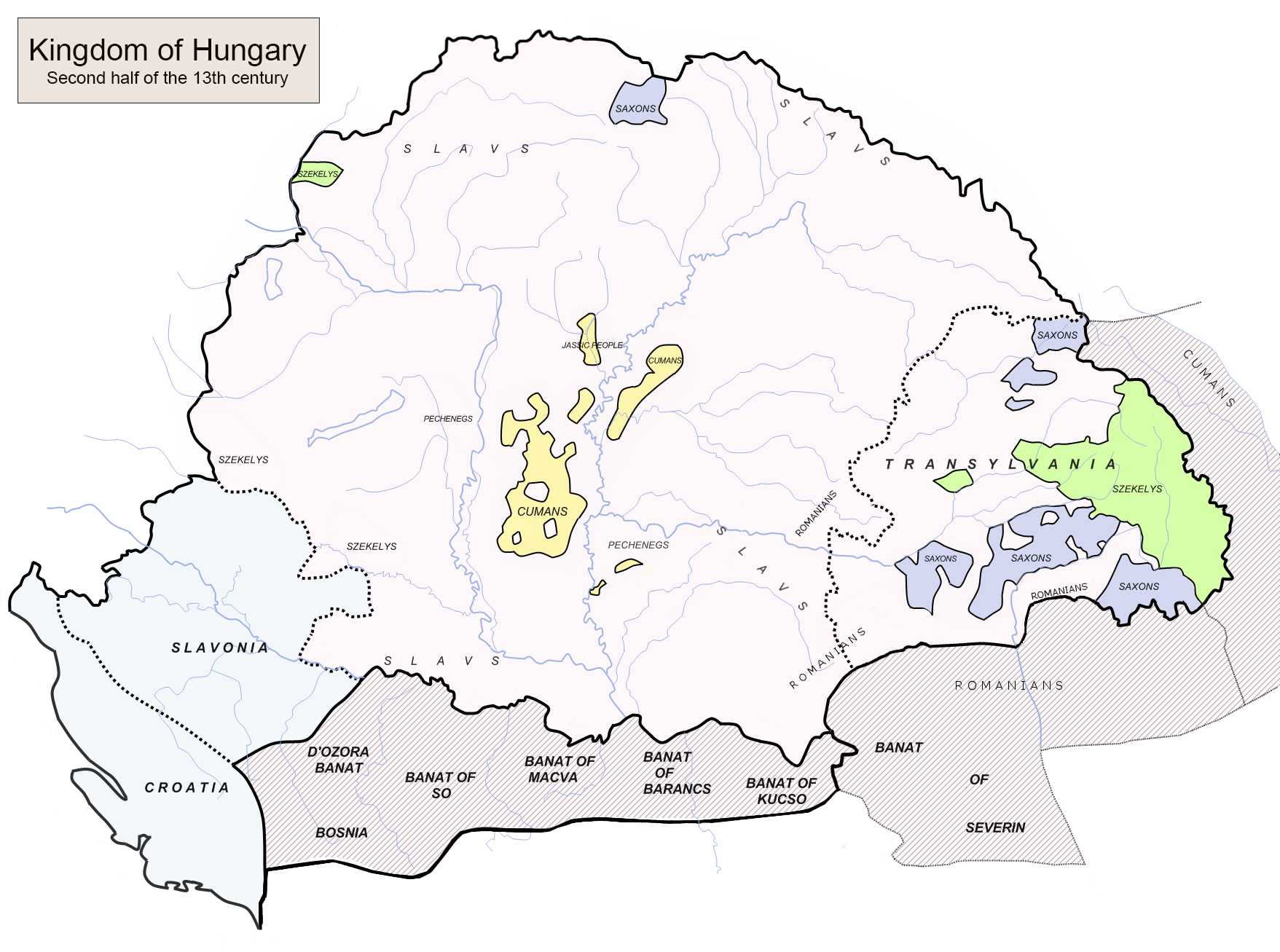
- Arpadian Hungary; in yellow, areas settled by Cuman and Jazyg people
- Capital: Kiskunfélegyháza (Little Cumania); Karcag (Greater Cumania)
- Demonym: Cumans/Kuns
- Area
  - 1820s: 420 km^{2} (160 sq mi)
- Population
  - 1855: 120,000
- History
  - Ethnic autonomy granted: 1279
  - Seats created: 15th century
  - Ottoman occupation: 1540s
  - Sold to the Teutonic Order: 1702
  - Suppressed under the Treaty of Szatmár: 1711
  - Restored as Jászkunság: 1745
  - Disestablished: 1876
Preceded by	Succeeded by
Kingdom of Hungary (1000–1301)	Pest-Pilis-Solt-Kiskun County; Jász-Nagykun-Szolnok County (former)
- Today part of: Hungary

Kunság (German: Kumanien; Latin: Cumania), later also known as Jászkunság or Jászkun kerület (lit. "Jassic–Cuman District"), is a historical, ethnographic and geographical region in Hungary, corresponding to a former political entity created by and for the Cumans or Kuns. It is currently divided between the counties of Bács-Kiskun and Jász-Nagykun-Szolnok; these correspond roughly to two distinct traditional entities, Little Cumania and Greater Cumania, which are longitudinally separated by the Tisza. Kunság and its subdivisions were first organized by the Kingdom of Hungary to accommodate semi-nomadic Cumans escaping from the Mongol Empire. The Cuman enclaves were sometimes incorporated with Jazygia, which was similarly set up and named for Ossetian nomads.

Kunság was the result of a second and final Cuman colonization in Hungary; while not the only Cuman-inhabited area, it remained the only centre of Cuman self-rule after the end of Arpadian Hungary. Tradition dates its emergence to 1279, when Ladislaus IV, a half-Cuman King of Hungary, granted its first set of fiscal and judicial privileges. These were confirmed in the 15th century, when Cumans began organizing themselves into "seats" overseen by a Palatine of the Kingdom. However, the consolidation of feudalism created dissatisfaction across the region, leading to its participation in György Dózsa's uprising of 1514.

The area was devastated during the Ottoman–Hungarian wars, and further depopulated by the Ottoman occupation of Hungary. It was repopulated by Hungarians and Slovaks upon the establishment of Habsburg Hungary. The new regime granted Kunság to the Teutonic Order and repressed Cuman separatism, especially after the inhabitants' willing participation in Rákóczi's War of Independence. Centralizing tendencies were nevertheless toned down under Maria Theresa and, in 1745, Kunság and Jazygia were merged into a single autonomous district, whose inhabitants were allowed to buy their way out of serfdom. The prosperous region had a population boom, which allowed its now-mixed population to colonize other parts of the realm.

Intellectual debates about the characteristics and role of Cuman identity first took place under Josephinism, and were prolonged over the following centuries—even as the Cuman language had died out. Initially, Kunság intellectuals described their identity as Finno-Ugric and complementing Hungarian nationalism. With this shift in discourse, Kunság and Jazygia ceased to exist politically in 1876, when they were folded into larger and less autonomous counties. Popular interest in the Cuman legacy endures into the 21st century, with more emphasis placed on the region's Turkic roots, as well as on differences between Cuman and non-Cuman Hungarians.

== History ==
=== Precedents ===
While the Hungarian tribes moved into Hungary, the Cumans still inhabited the vast areas of the Pontic–Caspian steppe, where they had created a powerful nomadic confederacy (see Cumania). The 13th-century Gesta Hungarorum claims that Cumans were present in the Principality of Hungary ca. 900, describing the Aba tribesmen as Cumans. This account is nevertheless anachronistic, meaning that Gesta's "Cuman" is perhaps a stand-in for "Turkic", "Khazar", or "Bulgar". The first verifiable attestations of Cumans in Arpadian Hungary were as raiders, during the 11th century; they later returned as mercenaries backing the Hungarian Kings. Stephen II's retinue included a Cuman contingent led by a Captain Tatar, which became a nuisance to the locals after pillaging the local resources. Possibly Cuman "Saracen" troops assisted Géza II in his 1150s war against the Lombard League.

In the early 13th century, Hungarian–Cuman relations were again tense, prompting Andrew II to create a system of border defences, which included granting the border region of Burzenland to the Teutonic Order. This group streamlined the first effort to Christianize Cuman communities living outside the Pannonian Basin. The Cumans were themselves attacked and defeated by the Mongol Empire; most Cumans fled to Hungary, the Bulgarian Empire, and the Byzantine Empire. By the 1220s, many were concentrated to the east of Hungary, in areas later known as Moldavia and Bessarabia. Their conversion to Christianity began here, under Hungarian auspices, leading to the establishment of a Cumanian Catholic Bishopric; some members of the tribes had converted to rival Eastern Orthodoxy, or to Bogomilism, and had to be brought back to Catholicism. At that stage, an untold number of Cumans in Hungary were converts to Islam.

In 1238, King Béla IV specifically invited Cumans under Köten (Kuthen, Kotyan) to colonize a central part of his realm (ad mediculum terre sue), presumably located near the Tisza. These Cumans arrived in 1239, but there was violence between the nomadic Cumans and the settled Hungarians. Cuman assassins murdered Köten on the behalf of some Hungarian nobles, and the Cumans returned to the Balkans in 1241, pillaging Syrmia as an act of revenge.

=== Origins ===
Following the Mongol invasion of Hungary in 1246, Béla re-invited Cumans and smaller group of Jazyges (an Ossetian tribe) back to Hungary, to settle in devastated areas of the Great Hungarian Plain. The migration reportedly involved some 40,000–70,000 Cumans, divided into 7 tribes: Olás, Csertán, Kór, Borcsol, Kondám, Honcsuk, and Jupogó. The culturally distinct Jazyges were closely allied with the various Cuman groups, their fate having become "intertwined in the wake of the Mongolian expansion."

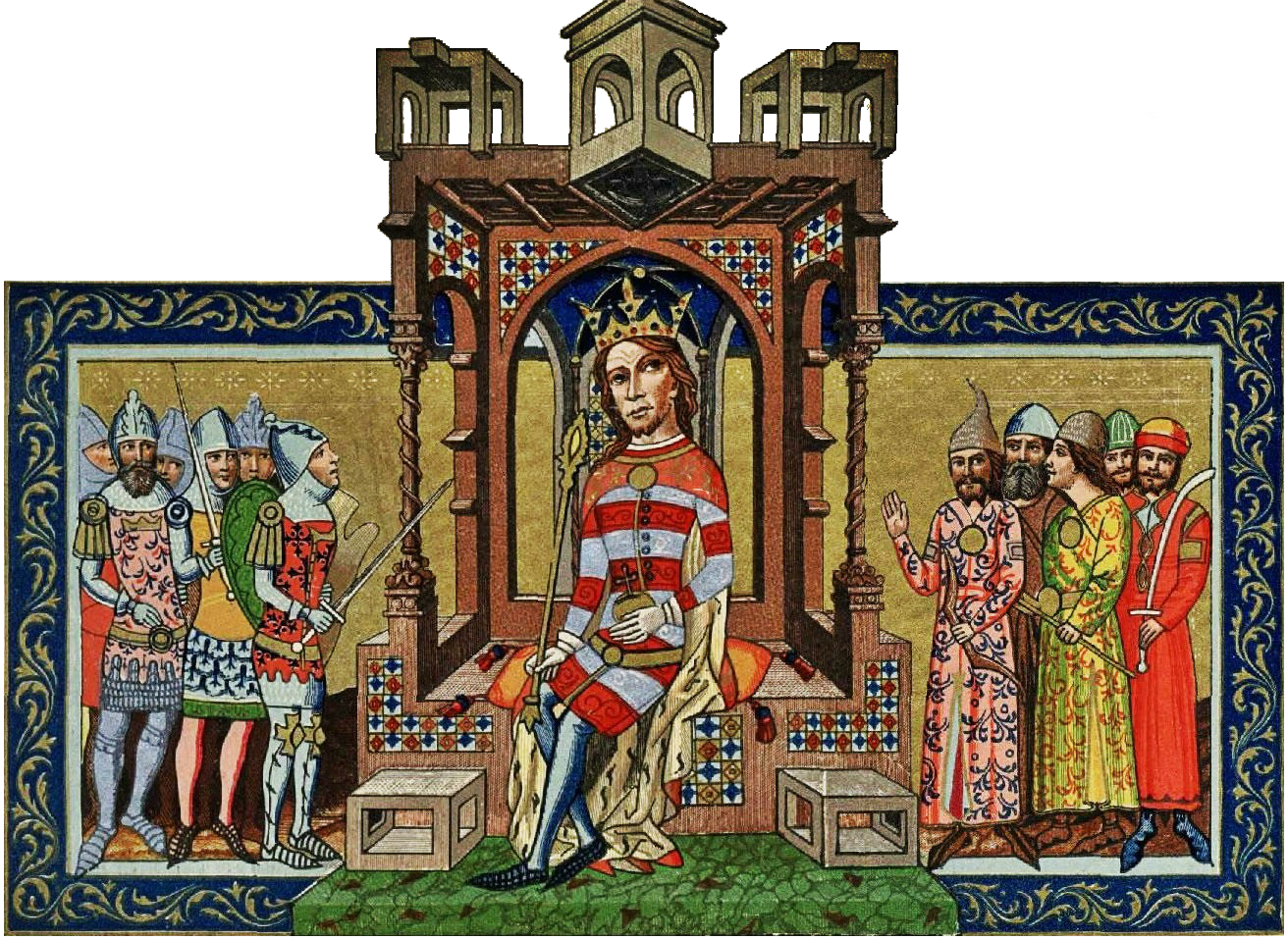
First page of the Chronicon Pictum, showing Louis I's court. On the right are warriors in Oriental clothing, including a yellow-clad Cuman

The 14th-century Chronicon Pictum shows Cumans as the king's yellow-clad army, in close proximity to the kings, between the Pecheneg guard and Székely frontiersmen. Cumans are also mentioned as present at the Battle of Kressenbrunn, possibly in larger numbers than their Hungarian allies. Their importance to Hungary was underscored when Béla betrothed his son Stephen to Köten's daughter, Elizabeth the Cuman. Her son, King Ladislaus IV, was noted for his unusually strong links with Kunság settlers.

In 1279, Ladislaus probably formalized Cuman territorial autonomy in the main region of settlement. In exchange for feudal duties to the Hungarian king in his war against the Mongols, the Cumans were allowed to keep their own ethnic customs. Despite being regionally centred in the Great Plain, "tiny groups of Cumans and Jazyges" could still be found throughout the Kingdom in the 13th century. The Kór and Borcsol stayed in the southeastern counties of Csanád and Temes; a Zeihan Dux Cumanorum ("Duke of the Cumans") is mentioned here in 1255. The Jazyges colonized central areas in lands adjacent to the main Cuman settlements; however, some settled near the Borcsol, near the Maxond Dunes. Documentary and archeological evidence suggests that at least some Olás Cumans were sent to Bihar County (presently Bihor, Romania). In 1323, tribal leader Demetrius owned Körösszeg fortress. A "Cuman Street" was also attested in medieval Szeged.

Nomadic groups still had sporadic clashes with the locals: in 1280, a Borcsol rebel army was defeated by Ladislaus near Hódmezővásárhely, then expelled to what became Wallachia. Groups from this diaspora probably returned to Temes, with Cumans Vchugan and Iuanchuch still owning and selling land in Bobda in 1288. Such attacks, and messages of protest from the Catholic Church, eventually increased pressures for assimilation and full conversion: already in 1279, the Diet of Hungary legislated on the mass baptism of still-pagan Cumans and promised to disperse them across the realm. Both conclusions were largely ignored by the king, although conversion from polytheism is traceable to the 13th century, which sees the first mentions of Cumans with Christian names. There is no suggestion that Cuman settlers were required to sedentarize: the first records of Cuman towns appear in Angevin Hungary, some two centuries after the colonization, and toponymy shows that they were all founded by chieftains, and named after them.

=== Consolidation ===
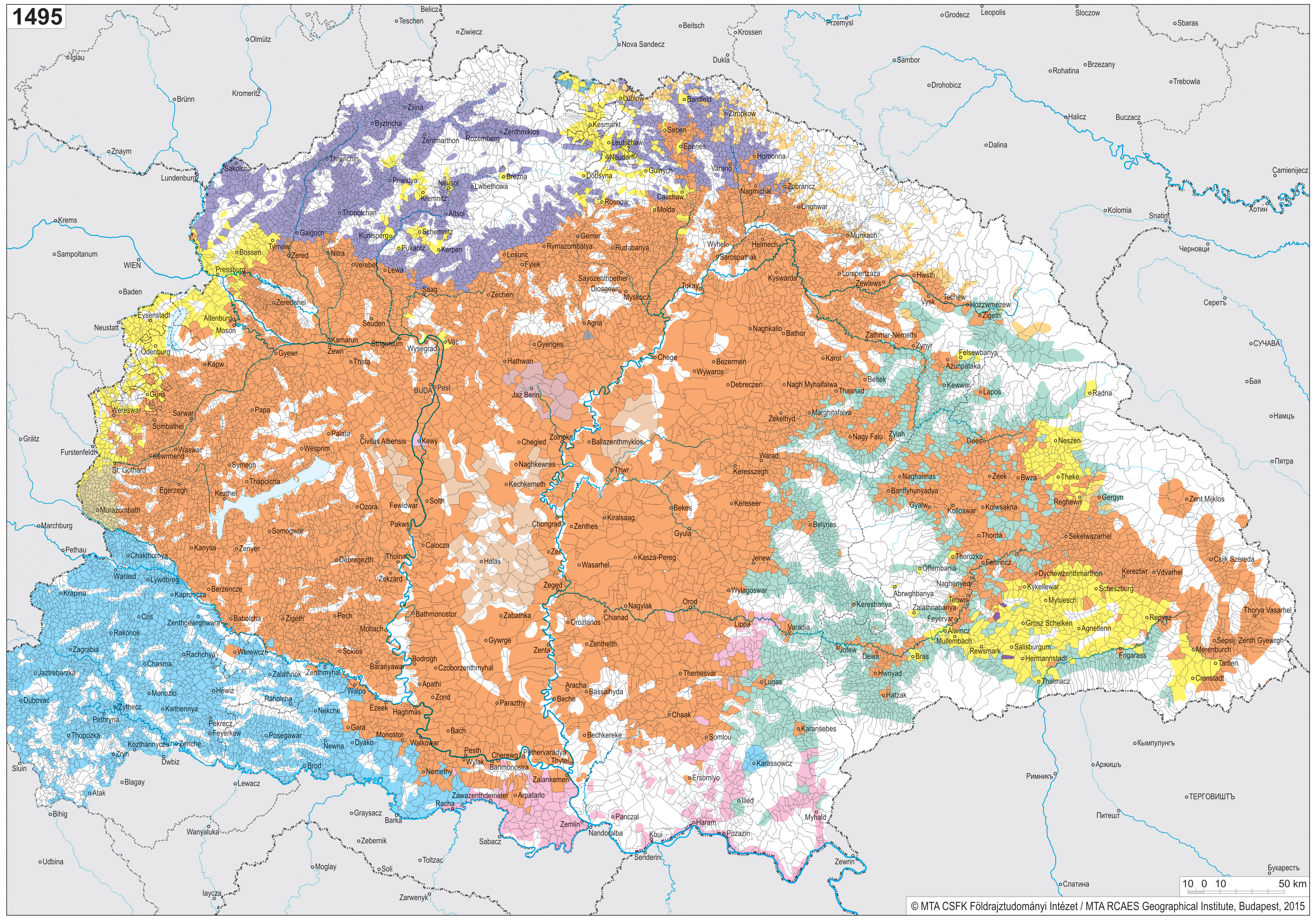
Estimated ethnic maps of the Kingdom of Hungary in 1495 by the Hungarian Academy of Sciences, based on research from Hungarian scholars. Cumans are depicted in light brown in the center regions of Kingdom of Hungary. The date 1495 is based on a nationwide registry conducted in the Kingdom of Hungary by commission of the royal treasury. The 1495 map shows the estimated absolute or relative linguistic majority of the local population based on the family names of taxpayers recorded in national or domanial registers, the linguistic analysis of the names of geographic objects and on various scholarly sources.

The migration of Moldavian Cumans or their assimilation by Vlachs was probably complete by 1332; that year, the Cuman Bishopric was given an ethnically neutral name, taken from the Milcov River. By then, the core areas of their settlement were emerging as the twin entities of Kunság and Jazygia. This separation had occurred in 1323, when 18 "family heads" of the Jazyges declared their secession from Kunság. In the late 14th century, at the end of a slow process, the Cumans' land was split into distinct subregions, both of them enclaves in Hungarian land. An area between Szolnok and Debrecen became Greater Cumania (Nagykunság) while an area between Kalocsa and Szeged became Little Cumania (Kiskunság).

The origin of the two names is puzzling, especially given that Little Cumania, though less populous, is more than twice the size of Greater Cumania. The separation may originate or relate with the military distinction between "Cumans of the King" and "Cumans of the Queen", though it is not precisely known which regiment was associated with which enclave. The names of "Greater" and "Little" may designate geographical positioning, with the former region situated "across the Tisza".

Cuman and Jazygian seats (marked by crescents) within the autonomous territories, c. 1500; Cumans are in green, Jazygians in orange, with shading marking unorganized or assimilated areas of settlement

The tribes underwent a change of lifestyle after finding an economic niche as pastoralists, but also adopted habitation patterns from the depopulated Hungarian villages where they had been originally settled. Though enjoying some fiscal privileges, the Cumans and Jazyges were ordered by King Sigismund to pay an annual census tax—a measure which may indicate that they were no longer relevant as soldiers. In the 15th century, both groups were urbanized enough to be organized into "seats", "universities", and "captaincies", all of which were under a Palatine of the Kingdom. The first seat was Szentelt-szék, mentioned in 1424 and located outside Kunság, among the Kór. Another one was organized in 1440 for the Olás tribe of Greater Cumania, at Kolbaz.

While this transfer of power resembled the autonomous organization of Székely Land, Cumans and Jazyges enjoyed fewer collective privileges; likewise, the title of Iudex Cumanorum ("Judge of the Cumans") declined from being a prime function of the Palatine to a temporary function of the Comites. Within that setting, Cuman Captains emerged as lords, increasingly regarding communal land as their families' fief. Resistance to encroachment by the Hungarian state led the inhabitants of Kunság to join a 1514 rebellion led by György Dózsa. Chronicler Stephan Stieröchsel suggests that Dózsa's arrival in Kunság was enough to incite a bloodletting.

Retaliation against the offenders was codified by the repressive code of István Werbőczy, which stipulated that Cumans could only travel out of Kunság if they were fiscally solvent. Before 1600, a "last great wave of evangelization" was finally initiated by the Franciscans, which also reduced cultural differences between Kunság tribes and the surrounding population. This phenomenon was closely followed by the introduction of Reformation ideas: while Kunság became majority-Protestant, Jazyges still followed Catholicism.

=== Ottoman conquest and Habsburg recolonization ===
Kunság was raided during the Ottoman–Hungarian wars, as a result of which as many as 60% of Cuman settlements vanished; the process was only accelerated during the Ottoman occupation of Hungary. The Little Cumanian town of Kecskemét received personal protection from Mehmed III, symbolized by a gold-threaded kaftan. Kecskemét's mayor would wear this garment while meeting Ottoman troops, reminding them of the pledge. "Under continuous harassment", other inhabitants of Kunság took to the marshes bordering the region, or fled Hungary altogether. This process saw them identifying more closely with their Hungarian neighbours, and resulted in a more accelerated adoption of the Hungarian identity. However, historian Nathalie Kálnoky argues that Cuman and Jazyg identities were unwittingly protected by the Ottoman invasion, since it interrupted the two group's "dissolution" into the estates of the realm. The Ottoman traveller Sheikh Ali still identified a distinct Cuman presence in their new provinces, describing Cumans as similar to Tatars, and noting that they still maintained their customs. Initially, this also referred to a preservation of the Cuman language, which nevertheless died out during the mid 17th century.

Anti-Ottoman resistance was put up by Habsburg Hungary—which initially held only Upper Hungary (today mostly Slovakia). Over the 17th century, this rump state continued to claim "Cumania" as a constituent Land of the Hungarian Crown. At crowning ceremonies of the Hungarian Kings, Kunság was distinctly represented by banners with a lion rampant. Kunság still had trade relations with Upper Hungary, with Kecskemét acting as a hub for the East–West trade in Anatolian rugs. The area also involved itself in anti-Ottoman dissent. In 1641, Kecskemét paid homage to Leopold I's Palatine, Nikolaus Esterházy, by awarding him one of its rugs. In 1662, the city became home to a large colony of Greeks who fled Ottoman repression.

The long series of Habsburg expeditions weakened the Ottoman Empire and forced its military out of Hungary-proper. The country was secured for Charles III in 1685, two years into the Great Turkish War. Its population "almost entirely wiped out", Kunság was opened for Cuman repopulation: land was assigned to tight groups of Cumans who had served in the Habsburg military forces. In 1702, with Habsburg acquiescence, Kunság was mortgaged to the Teutonic Order. Though formally reduced to near-serfdom, Cumans were able to hold on to some of their tax and judicial privileges. Nevertheless, their social decline led them to join other Kuruc rebels during Rákóczi's War of Independence (1703–1711).

This new uprising was finally ended by the Treaty of Szatmár, which stipulated that the suppression of all autonomy for the Cumans and Jazyges; the decision was then upheld by the Hungarian Diet. Medievalists Nora Berend and Kyra Lyublyanovics both argue that dissatisfaction with Habsburg centralism reinforced ethnic separatism and contributed to the brief reemergence of a Cuman ethnos; a forged version of the "Cuman laws" of 1279 was produced in the 18th century to justify ancient liberties against normative pressures. Other scholars believe that the document is a reasonably faithful copy of King Ladislaus' writ, with only some modifications.

=== Jászkunság creation ===
Map of Jászkunság borders c. 1800: Little Cumania in dark green, Greater Cumania in lime, and Jazygia in orange

Elements of self-rule were finally restored by Queen Maria Theresa on May 6, 1745. She had heard renewed pleas submitted by members of both enclaves, but was also interested in getting them to ransom their freedom—the Habsburg monarchy needed financing for the Second Silesian War. Fused into "Jászkunság" or "Jazygia-Cumania", the two regions had judicial and executive autonomy under the Palatine; there was equality of taxation, and the tribes were allowed to accept or reject applications for individual membership. Within six years, the Cumans had paid in full the "security pledge" that they still owed to the Hungarian court, thus securing their freedom from serfdom.

Upon liquidating its debt to the Crown, Jászkunság emerged as a relatively prosperous entity, which by 1784 had a budget surplus. The restoration of its liberties made it an attractive destination for members of the lesser Hungarian nobility. As such, the final decades of the 18th century witnessed a steady growth of population, which led to the creation of new towns, including Kiskunfélegyháza and Szabadszállás. In Greater Cumania, six older towns were fully rebuilt: Karcag, Kisújszállás, Kunhegyes, Kunmadaras, Kunszentmárton, and Túrkeve. The Queen allowed Catholic Kunszentmárton the privilege of maintaining Jászkunság's prison, preferring it over Protestant Karcag. Meanwhile, Jazygia developed only three towns, Jászapáti, Jászárokszállás, and Jászberény—though in 1720 the latter was the Great Plain's third-largest, after Debrecen and Kecskemét.

Migrations to the district included hundreds of Romanies, although the authorities of Jazygia resisted government orders to settle them in as "new Hungarians". Among the new arrivals to the region were new groups of Greeks (many of whom were presumably Aromanian) who set up Orthodox parish churches in Karcag and Kecskemét. These institutions were at the centre of disputes between the Ecumenical Patriarchate and the Eparchy of Buda. At Kiskunlacháza, the population remained Cuman and Catholic, while the adjacent (and later incorporated) village of Pereg was reestablished ca. 1750 by Hungarians and Slovaks, who were Calvinists.

Such urbanization allowed Cumans to participate in the recolonization of Bács-Bodrog County, further to the south; however, the recording and correction of borders in the age of Josephinism prevented Jászkunság itself from expanding southward and created frustration among its inhabitants. The self-governing communities also had occasional conflicts with their neighbours to the north: in 1776 the government of Heves County destroyed a sluice, forcing Cumans downstream to leave their homes; in 1785 Joseph II ordered Heves to rebuild that facility. That same year, Jászkunság was made subordinate to a temporary district, with a new capital at Pest.

In the 1820s, Danish geographer Conrad Malte-Brun recorded as many as 33,000 inhabitants in Greater Cumania, 8,400 of whom lived in Karcag (spelled Kardzag). He also estimated that Little Cumania, comprising "two valleys", was home to 42,000 people, with roughly the same number of Jazyges living in the eponymous area. He records Greater Cumania's surface as being 20 Hungarian miles, which is approximately 160 square kilometres; he estimated Little Cumania and Jazygia as having approximately 320 and 150 square kilometres, respectively.

=== Integration and final partition ===
The Cuman cultural revival was still observable in 1801, when Péter Horváth of Jászberény, the "vice captain" and "first notary of the Jazyges and Cumans", published his treatise of regional history. Pushes for autonomy were more often than not ignored by the Hungarian Diet, and sabotaged by local aristocrats. Sent as Jászkunság's first delegate to the Diet in 1832, János Illéssy fought to preserve judicial and fiscal equality for all Cumans, but lost to a noblemen's caucus. This trend was only accelerated when Palatine Joseph appointed a Conservative, Imre Szluha, to serve as regional Captain.

Inhabitants of the two Cumanias were largely satisfied with Habsburg rule, and generally refrained from participating in the Hungarian Revolution of 1848. A meeting of liberals and radicals was held at Kisújszállás on March 28, but their influence was overshadowed by arch-conservatives, who took over in both enclaves before the end of the year. By contrast, the residents of Jászberény were enthusiastic supporters of the rebel government, also demanding increased autonomy under a Jász-Kun Polgár Elnök ("President of Jazygia-Cumania"), and election reform. In August, a national guard battalion from Kunság participated in the clashes between Hungary and Serbian Vojvodina. Stationed on Csepel Island, it also saw action against the invading armies of Croatia, before being moved to Upper Hungary. Following defeat at Mór, Kunság towns accommodated a large number of refugees as well as the armies of Mór Perczel. Oral tradition claims that Perczel camped at Hegyesbori-Nagy-halom, outside Karcag, in early 1849.

Habsburg and Russian troops reached the Tisza in mid-July 1849, but resistance continued to be put up in parts of Kunság: Colonel Korponay attempted to ignite an anti-Russian revolt in Kunmadaras, before retreating to Debrecen. The region then experienced direct Russian occupation, the direct military rule by the Austrian Empire (see Military District of Pest-Ofen). The official count for 1849 indicated that there were 178,187 full-blooded Hungarians living in the whole of Jászkunság. Limits on political life were imposed during the 1850s and '60s, when cooperative societies and guilds were closely supervised by the state; their operation was further reduced by a major drought in 1863–1864.

By 1870, Jazygia was the more developed area of Jászkunság, concentrating the economic power and local aristocracy. Described in Lippincott's Pronouncing Gazetteer of 1855 as an "independent district" comprising two parts, Kunság alone had at the time some 120,000 inhabitants. Little Cumania had 64,000 residents (37,000 of them Protestants), and Greater Cumania 55,000. The latter region had only "one market town", namely Karcag, while Little Cumania included several urban centres, of which the most populous was Kiskunfélegyháza. By then, the fragmentation of governance between Jászkunság's three components was creating administrative problems, as well as an incentive for the territories' dissolution into the county system.

Autonomy was maintained after the Austro-Hungarian Compromise of 1867, but became the topic of political debates in Budapest. The final push against "feudal" autonomies was directed not by the conservative caucus, but by Gyula Szapáry, a liberal Minister of the Interior. His controversial bill, presented in December 1873, proposed to divide the area between three larger counties, with Little Cumania and parts of Jazygia being attached together with Solt. In their counter-proposal, Jazygian delegates in the National Assembly urged for an independent Jász County, which would have incorporated Szolnok, Hatvan, and Nádudvar.

Szapáry's project was resubmitted with sweeping amendments by his successor Kálmán Tisza. On June 19, 1876, following a vote in the National Assembly, Jászkunság was permanently abolished and divided between Jász-Nagykun and Pest-Pilis-Solt-Kiskun counties. The former was created on September 4, 1876, when Miklós Kiss took over as Ispán. The same day, a meeting of representatives from all areas conceded that the county seat be located at Szolnok, which was more developed. The county was renamed "Jász-Nagykun-Szolnok" by national legislation, inheriting the archives of both Kunság and Jazygia. The immediate toll of such integration was a relative loss in industrial importance for Jászberény and Kunszentmárton, which were overtaken by Szolnok and a cluster of towns in Tiszazug.

== Ethnicity and culture ==
=== Genetics ===
Although commonly seen as part of the Turkic family, the Cumans were probably ethnically diverse even before they entered Hungary. Scholar Simon Szyszman highlights this aspect by noting that "marriages between Cumans and other peoples were frequent". Archeologist Silviu Oța describes Cuman society as comprising "bits and pieces of previously destroyed tribes, whose collective memory of tribal origin had been preserved by the simple class of warriors". It is thus probable that before 1200 Cumans had acculturated a mass of the Kipchaks, which were also Turkic. Lyublyanovics describes the original Cumans as a loose confederation of various ethnic backgrounds, noting that they were "only brought together by the need to escape the Mongols". Their partial ethnogenesis began upon their arrival to the Great Plain: "the new social and economic environment they faced was so different from the one they were used to in their previous home on the steppe that the differences among the numerous Cuman clans might have appeared unimportant compared to the differences between them and the sedentary inhabitants of their new homeland."

The conclusion was supported by evidence from physical anthropology and phylogeography. In 1975, researcher Gyula Gyenis found only minor differences in the dermatoglyphics of Kiskunlacháza and neighbouring Hungarian localities. In 1981 T. Tóth used comparative cephalometry to argue that all Hungarians were racially similar to Ossetians, and as such Caucasian rather than Mongoloid. He also proposed that most inhabitants of Jászkunság shared racial traits with the mainline Hungarians. Such verdicts were partly contradicted by archaeologist Kinga Éry, who researched Perkáta's cemetery and concluded that the original Cumans were "Euro-mongoloid", with a short stature and skull.

Kunság (shaded) and the Great Hungarian Plain (dark green) within modern Hungary

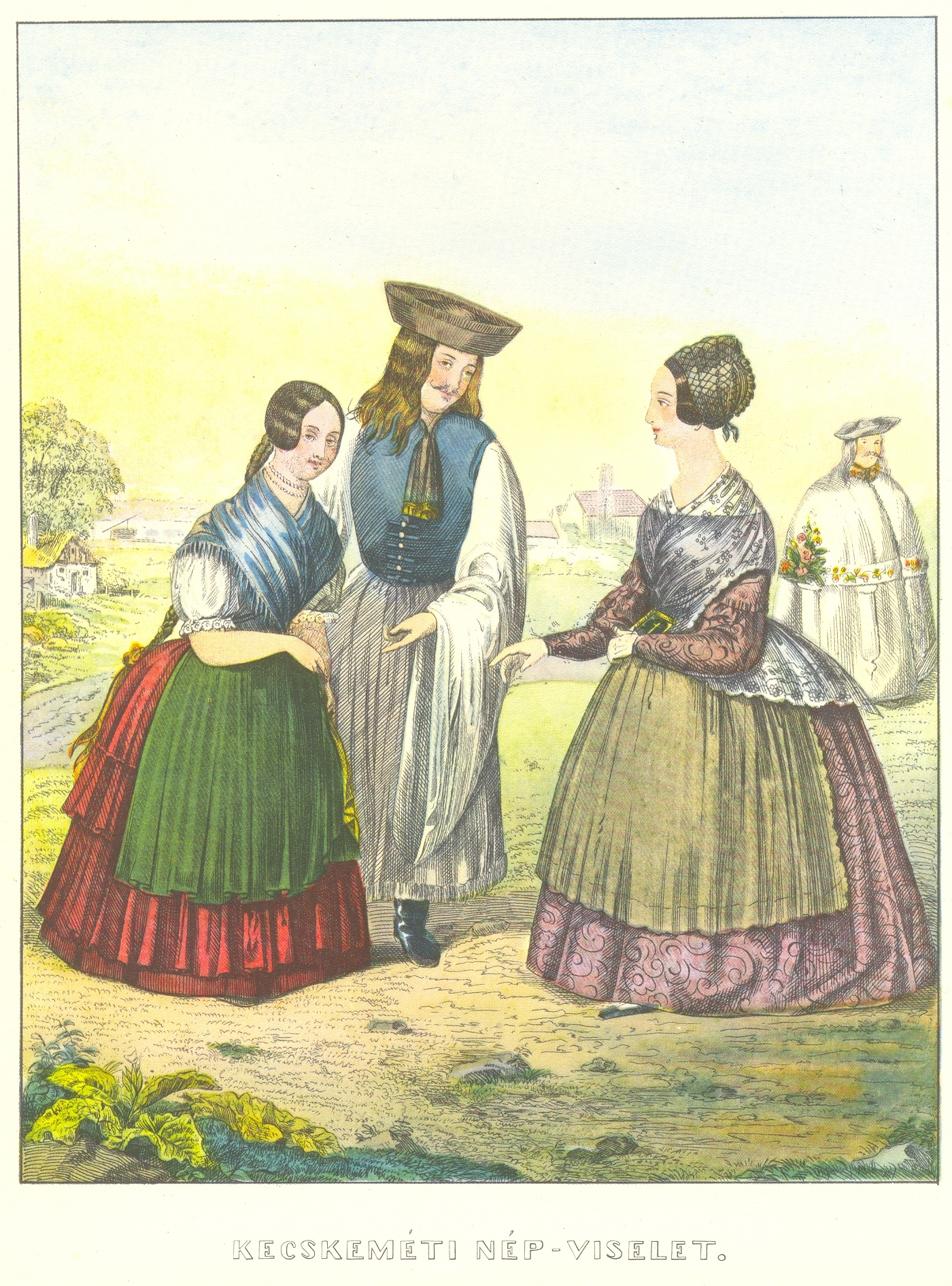
Citizens of Kecskemét in traditional clothing (Leopold Steinrucker, 1845)

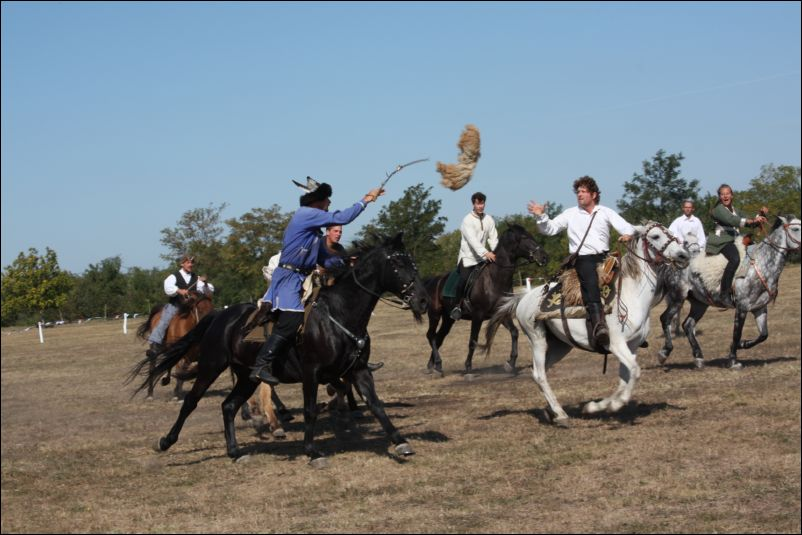
Reenactors playing kokboru at the "First World Meeting of Cumans" (Jász-Nagykun-Szolnok County, 2009)

In a collective study of 2005, the mtDNA of Cuman remains revealed six haplogroups; most were West Eurasian rather than Asian. This suggests that early Cumans were already genetically diverse (with some European ancestry), even if their relics showed them to be culturally homogeneous. The conclusion may under-evaluate ethnic diversity in Kunság, since the sample presumably included members of just one "Cuman" clan.

=== Traditions ===
Lyublyanovics additionally notes that there was no clear record of self-identification in Hungarian sources, which may lump various groups into one singular "Cuman" population. Thus: "Cumans were not categorized as a cultural or ethnic group and there was no special vocabulary to describe their religious standing, social position or political organization: the [Latin] term Cumani covered all these. In the case of individual Cumans, when the designation Cumanus was added to their proper names it was used not as a cultural or ethnic term but as a sign of legal status".

The only "ethnic marker" for all groups described by such terminology seems to have been their costume and hairstyle, including pigtails and kaftans which were not adopted by any other nomads in Hungary. Likewise, the more remote areas of Kunság continued to practice "traditional household slaughter" of animals, which included the breaking of bones; this may also suggest that they maintained some pre-Christian rituals. Though they learned agriculturalist skills from their neighbours, Kunság's residents remained attached to pastoralism, and resisted feudal pressures by relying on commons and homesteads. They continued to rate cattle-herding as a worthy occupation, and adorned their homes with the skulls of horses.

"Spectacular burials of Cuman leaders (with a full panoply of material objects and a horse)", though rare, still occurred even after 1300; actual kurgans were only rarely constructed in Kunság. Horváth introduced the concept of "Cumanian mounds" for tumuli located in the Great Plain. Most of these were nevertheless built long before the Cuman arrival, by a variety of peoples, and were not geographically tied to Kunság. One example of a regional tumulus is Asszonyszállás, near Karcag, which locals relate to Cuman folk hero Zádor of Túrkeve.

By 1600, Cumans generally dressed like the other subjects of the Crown, and modern methods of animal husbandry had spread more profusely. The consolidation of Catholicism in the 15th century created samples of cultural synthesis. Though late-medieval Cumans continued to place much importance on belts, like their nomadic ancestors, their belt buckles were adorned with Western motifs—a Gothic one was found in Kiskunmajsa. Archeological finds in Karcag suggest that local women wore buckles in the old Cuman fashion, but had Christian messages engraved on them. Many Cumans apparently maintained a connection with, or nostalgia for, Eastern Orthodoxy, as attested by the spread of Byzantine crosses. During this period, the practice of circumcision died out, having previously survived as an echo of Islam among Cumans who were crypto- or lapsed Muslims.

Although central to the Ottoman trade in textiles, Kunság was not a consumer of such goods. According to art historian Ida Bodné Bobrovszky, this showed that the area consciously resisted being "Turkicized", possibly influenced by Protestant preaching against Islamic proselytism. Within Habsburg Hungary, the return of autonomy resulted in another wave of cultural shifts and trading prohibitions, imposed by the Kunság authorities themselves. Collective autonomy came with social controls: "everyday culture [became] interspersed with privileges and standards laid down in local statutes [...]. The privileged district offered individual security in exchange for the observance of local community norms." The Council or Councils of Jászkunság issued sartorial regulations, limiting luxury and marking visually the social classes to which its constituents belonged.

=== Modernization and revivalism ===
During the early 19th century, Hungarian acculturation continued, with the Greeks and Aromanians of Kecskemét speaking Hungarian by 1846. Geographer Johann Georg Kohl described the Cumans themselves as "completely Magyarized" in 1840, though noting that they were set apart by a "warlike spirit". In tandem, revivalists began referring to ancient Cuman customs and ethnic markers, which in some cases are suspect of being invented traditions. At the time, Horváth and Julius Klaproth introduced the theory according to which Cumans, Jazyges and Hungarians were Finno-Ugric, and therefore "kinsmen". This stance partly overlapped with a working hypothesis for early Hungarian archaeologists such as Miklós Jankovich and Géza Nagy.

In the 1840s, Jászkunság autonomists became convinced that egalitarianism could only be achieved by the democratization of the contemporary feudal Hungary as a whole, which made them advocates of Hungarian nationalism. This trend was contrasted by a late-19th-century movement wishing for "Jász County" (Greater Cumania included) to secede from Szolnok, mainly on economic grounds. Presided upon by Orbán Sipos, the last Jazyg Captain, and later by Albert Apponyi, it was opposed locally by István Horthy (father of the more famous Miklós Horthy). The idea of distinct representation was also revived in December 1918, weeks after the Aster Revolution, when Miksa Strobl proposed to federalize the First Hungarian Republic. Two of Strobl's "Hungarian cantons" were to be named after the Cumans and Jazyges.

According to Lyublyanovics, the revivalist discourse was also a "positive reinforcement" of nationalism, portraying Cumans as "the best Hungarians" and the most authentic survivals from steppe cultures. As a subset of nationalism, Hungarian Turanism theorized that Turkic peoples and Hungarians were of a single Turanid race. However, in the 1930s ethnographer István Györffy of Karcag again shed focus on the distinguishing features of Kunság, including its Turkic background. According to Kálnoky, by 2006 Hungarians who saw themselves as Cuman and Jazyg were displaying "identitarian sensitivities". She rated these grievances as more notable than those of Hungarian Slovaks, Croats or Romanians. A 2012 survey noted a "strong, partly ethnic-religious identity" in Jász-Nagykun-Szolnok, rather than in Kunság as a region; the authors surmised that the newer territorial unit had geographical coherence.

Despite no longer being a living language after 1700, Cuman still produced a number of documents in the following centuries. A Lord's Prayer in Cuman, probably written during the Reformation, is known to have been circulated and recited in the 18th century. It reportedly existed in almost 100 variants, of which the surviving codified version may no longer reflect the vernacular of any actual Cuman tribe. This rendition was still being taught in public schools under the Second Hungarian Republic, before being taken out of the curriculum in 1948.

Outside this occasional usage, Cuman was no longer spoken: Malte-Brun describes a final effort to collect Cuman phrases as having occurred at Karcag in 1770. Regional Hungarian dialects have preserved some Cuman words, which are also recorded and used in literary and scientific contributions by István Mándoky Kongur. His work includes a study of children's rhymes, positing that apparent nonsense verse could, in fact, be Cuman rhyming. Cuman words may be the origin of place names such as "Debrecen".

== See also ==
- Jászság
- Islam in Hungary
- Turks in Hungary
- Jasz people
