= Csongrád (disambiguation) =

Csongrád is a town in southern Hungary.

Csongrád may also refer to:

- Csongrád County county in southern Hungary
- Csongrád County (former) former county in Hungary
