= Csongrád County (former) =

County of the Kingdom of Hungary

Csongrád County Comitatus Csongradiensis (Latin) Csongrád vármegye (Hungarian) Komitat Tschongrad (German)
- County of the Kingdom of Hungary (11th century-1538); County of the Eastern Hungarian Kingdom (1538-1552); County of the Kingdom of Hungary (1715-1786, 1790-1946)
- Coat of arms

- Capital: Csongrád; Szeged (1241-1773); Szegvár (1773-1883); Szentes (1883-1946)
- Area
  - Coordinates: 46°39′N 20°16′E
  - 1910: 3,569 km^{2} (1,378 sq mi)
- Population
  - 1910: 325,568
- History
  - Established: 11th century
  - Ottoman conquest: 1552
  - Great Turkish War begins: 14 July 1683
  - Treaty of Karlowitz: 26 January 1699
  - County recreated: 1715
  - Merged into Békés-Csanád-Csongrád County: 1 June 1786
  - County recreated: 26 April 1790
  - Treaty of Trianon: 4 June 1920
  - Re-annexation of ceded areas: 11 April 1941
  - Monarchy abolished: 1 February 1946
Succeeded by
Csongrád-Csanád County
- Today part of: Hungary (3,462 km^{2}); Serbia (107 km^{2})

Csongrád (Hungarian: Csongrád, Serbian: Чонград, Čongrad) was an administrative county (comitatus) of the Kingdom of Hungary. Its territory, which was smaller than that of present-day Csongrád-Csanád County, is now part of Hungary, except a very small area which belongs to Serbia. The capital of the county was Szentes.

== Name ==
The county was named after a town of Csongrád, which has a Slavic origin, meaning "black city" (čon/čorni = black, grad = city/town).

== Geography ==
In the late-19th and early-20th centuries Csongrád county shared borders with the Hungarian counties of Pest-Pilis-Solt-Kiskun, Jász-Nagykun-Szolnok, Békés, Csanád, Torontál and Bács-Bodrog. Prior to the reforms of the late-19th century it had shared borders with the Kiskunság/Jászkunság, Pest County, Heves County, the Voivodeship of Serbia and Banat of Temeschwar (1849-1860) and its predecessor the Banat of Temeswar (until 1786). Until the mid-18th century the southern part of the county, including Szeged, had been part of the Military Frontier, which the rest of the county bordered. The river Tisza flowed through the county. Its area was 3,544 km^{2} (1,368 sq mi) around 1910.

== History ==
Csongrád county arose in the 11th century as one of the first counties of the Kingdom of Hungary. It was taken by the Ottoman Empire in the 16th century, and reconquered by the Habsburg Kingdom of Hungary at the end of the 17th century (recognised in the 1699 Treaty of Karlowitz). The southern part of the county, including Szeged, was part of the (Mureș) Military Frontier until the mid-18th century.

On 1 June 1786 the county was merged with Békés and Csanád counties to form Békés-Csanád-Csongrád; they were re-separated in 1790.

In the period following the revolutions of 1848 (1849–1860), Csongrád was part of the Military District of Pest-Ofen.

The county gained Kiskundorozsma with the abolition of the Jászkunság in 1876. Prior to that the area had formed a large salient (panhandle) mostly separating the southernmost area from the rest of the county; the two areas were connected by a small section of land between Kiskundorozsma and the Tisza only around 3.2 km (2.0 mi) across.

In 1920, the Treaty of Trianon assigned a small part of the territory of the county – a small area around Horgos (now Horgoš, Vojvodina) in northern Délvidék – to the Kingdom of Serbs, Croats and Slovenes (renamed to Yugoslavia in 1929); the rest remained in Hungary. During World War II, Hungary annexed the lost territory, but after the end of the war the previous borders were restored.

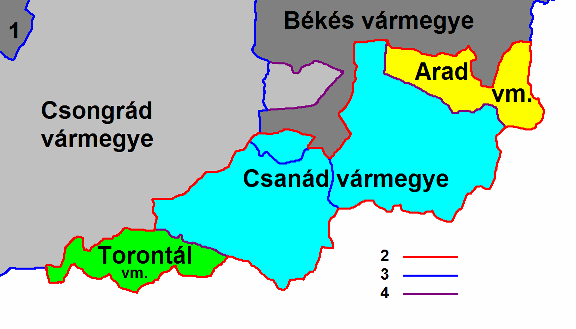
Border changes to Csongrád County in 1950. The blue line (3) represents the post-1950 county borders.

In the 1950 reform of the Hungarian counties, the south-western part of Csanád County (which comprised the Hungarian part of pre-1920 Torontál County and the south-western part of pre-1920 Csanád County) was added to Csongrád county; Kardoskút was transferred to Békés county. Csongrád County was renamed Csongrád-Csanád County on 4 June 2020.

== Demographics ==
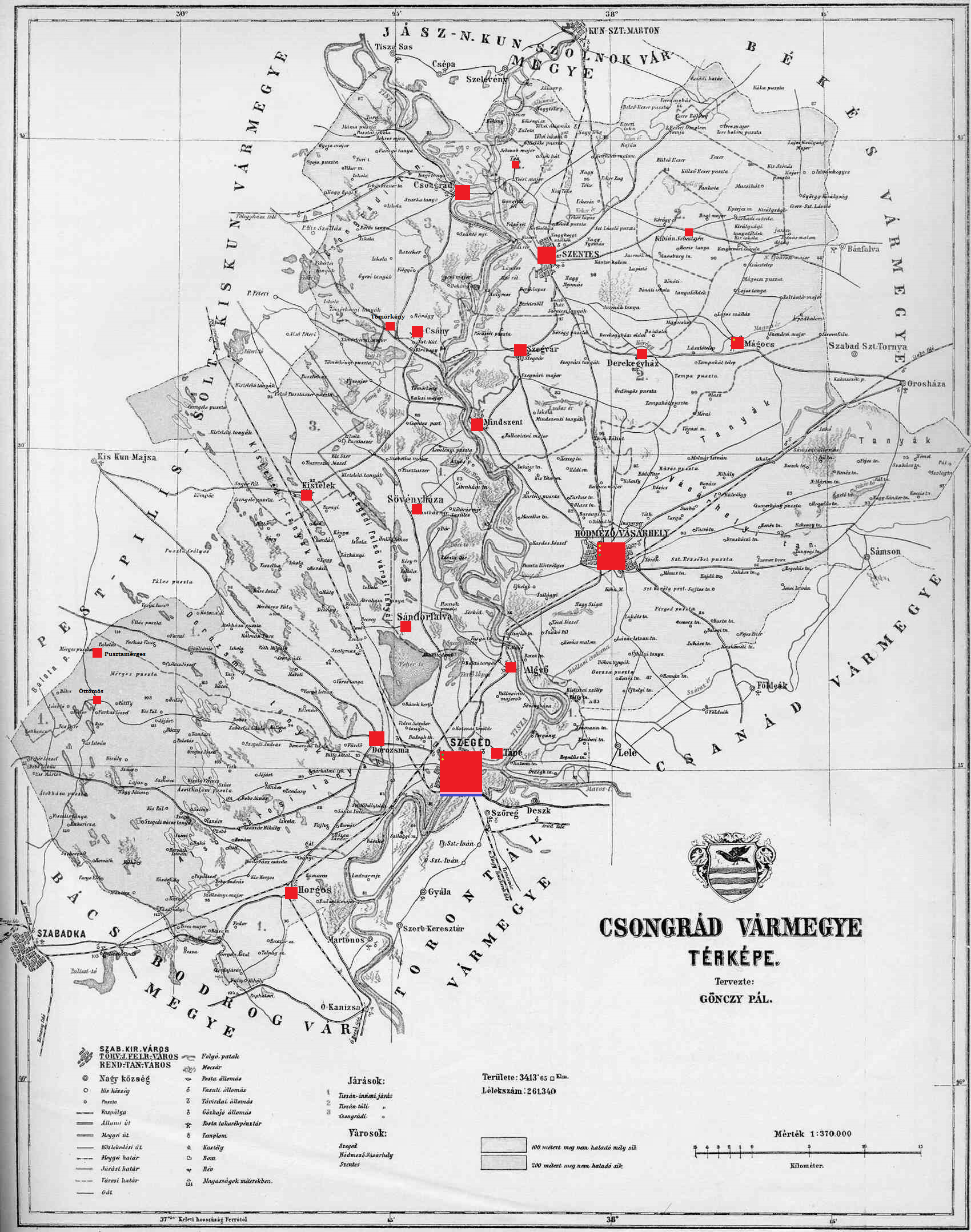
Ethnic map of the county with data of the 1910 census (see the key in the description).

Population by mother tongue (Note: Only linguistic communities > 1% are displayed.)
Census	Total	Hungarian	German	Other or unknown
1880	228,413	214,885 (98.05%)	2,289 (1.04%)	1,988 (0.91%)
1890	261,340	256,469 (98.14%)	2,743 (1.05%)	2,128 (0.81%)
1900	295,927	289,953 (97.98%)	3,582 (1.21%)	2,392 (0.81%)
1910	325,568	319,274 (98.07%)	2,862 (0.88%)	3,432 (1.05%)

Population by religion (Note: Only religious communities > 1% are displayed.)
Census	Total	Roman Catholic	Calvinist	Jewish	Lutheran	Other or unknown
1880	228,413	160,353 (70.20%)	55,441 (24.27%)	7,354 (3.22%)	3,236 (1.42%)	2,029 (0.89%)
1890	261,340	188,312 (72.06%)	57,785 (22.11%)	8,510 (3.26%)	4,239 (1.62%)	2,494 (0.95%)
1900	295,927	216,593 (73.19%)	61,315 (20.72%)	9,537 (3.22%)	4,838 (1.63%)	3,644 (1.23%)
1910	325,568	243,343 (74.74%)	61,832 (18.99%)	10,296 (3.16%)	5,449 (1.67%)	4,648 (1.43%)

== Subdivisions ==
In the early 20th century, the subdivisions of Csongrád county were:

Districts (járás)	
District	Capital
Csongrád	Csongrád
Tiszáninnen	Kiskundorozsma
Tiszántúl	Mindszent
Urban counties (törvényhatósági jogú város)
Hódmezővásárhely
Szeged
Urban districts (rendezett tanácsú város)
Szentes

=== Earlier subdivisions ===
In the early 19th century Csongrád County was divided into two processus, which were separated by the Tisza: Processus Cis-Tybiscanus in the west and Processus Trans-Tybiscanus in the east.

In 1854 Csongrád county comprised the following Bezirke (presented as they appear in the defining act):

- Stuhlbezirk Csongrád
- Stuhlbezirk Szentes
- Stuhlbezirk Vásárhely (Hódmezővásárhely)
- Landbezirk Szegedin (i.e. the area around the city)
- Stadtbezirk Szegedin (i.e. the city itself)

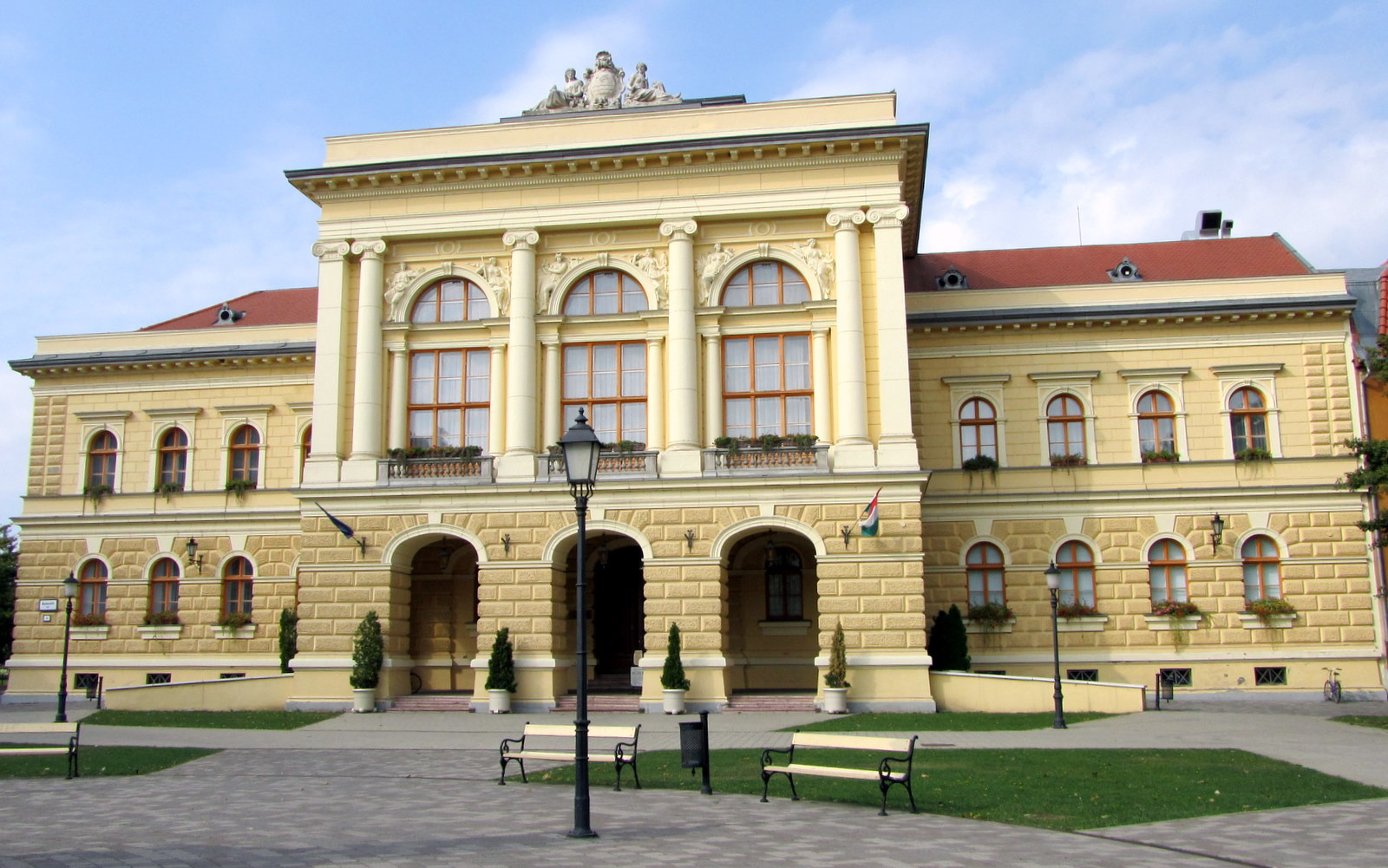
County Hall, Szentes
