= Cuman laws =

The Cuman laws were two provisions, issued on 23 June 1279 and 5 or 10 August 1279, regulating the social status and lifestyle of the Cumans, a nomadic people in the 13th-century Kingdom of Hungary.

Since the mid-13th century, the Cumans were a significant element of the Hungarian military organization, but their lifestyle and pagan religion gave rise to numerous conflicts with the majority Christian society. The half-Cuman monarch Ladislaus IV could not restore royal power in Hungary amid a civil war between rival baronial factions. A papal legate, Philip, bishop of Fermo, came to Hungary to help Ladislaus consolidate his authority, but the prelate was shocked at the presence of thousands of pagan Cumans in Hungary. Under his supervision, the Diet of Hungary adopted the Cuman laws in the summer of 1279. The authenticity of the second document is questioned by some historians.

Ladislaus IV hesitated to enforce the law, which only increased the tension. Ladislaus promised that he would force them to adopt a Christian lifestyle, but they refused to obey the legate's demands. Ladislaus decided to support the Cumans, for which Philip of Fermo excommunicated him. The Cumans imprisoned the legate, and the legate's partisans captured Ladislaus. In early 1280, Ladislaus agreed to persuade the Cumans to submit to the legate, but many Cumans preferred to leave Hungary. Ladislaus vanquished a Cuman army that invaded Hungary in 1282. Their defeat marked the beginning of the "feudalization" (i.e. social integration) of the Cuman subjects to the political, social and cultural structure of majority society, which lasted throughout the 14th century.

== Background ==
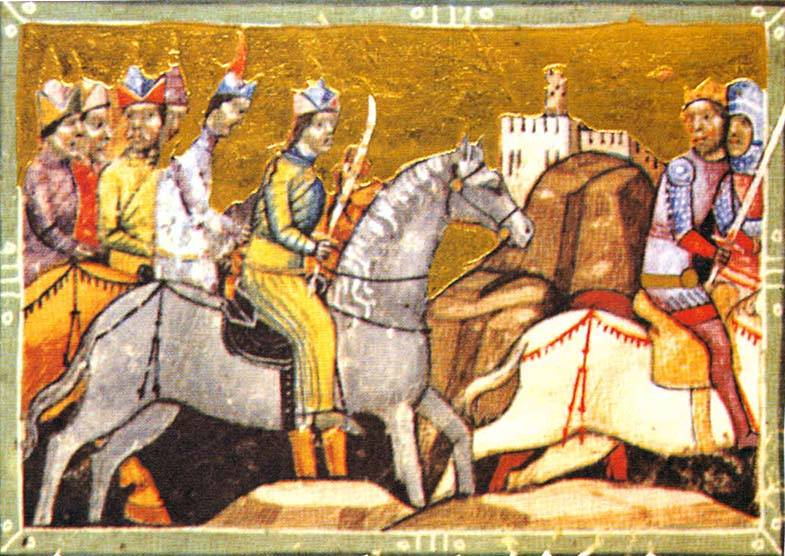
First Mongol invasion of Hungary in 1241–1242. The Tatars are dressed in Cuman clothes with sabers. (Chronicon Pictum, 1358)

The Cumans, a Turkic nomadic people from Central Asia, first appeared in East-Central Europe in the middle of the 11th century. In the midst of imminent danger of the Mongol invasion, the first Cumans settled in the Kingdom of Hungary, after King Béla IV of Hungary offered refuge to Khan Köten (Kötöny) and his people in 1239. The king's decision caused social, economic and political tension and the settlement of masses of nomadic Cumans in the plains along the river Tisza gave rise to many conflicts between them and the local villagers. When the Mongols reached the border and invaded Hungary in the spring of 1241, several Hungarians accused Köten and their Cumans of cooperating with the enemy. The Cumans left Hungary amid plunder, after an angry mob massacred Köten and his retinue in Pest. With their departure Béla lost his most valuable allies and the Mongols decisively defeated his royal army in the Battle of Mohi on 11 April 1241. Following the withdrawal of the Mongols in the next year, Béla invited the Cumans to return and settle in the depopulated plains between the rivers Danube and Tisza, in return for their military service. He even arranged the engagement of his firstborn son, Stephen, who was crowned king-junior in or before 1246, to Elizabeth, a daughter of a Cuman chieftain.

The issue of the social integration of the Cumans had marginalized in the following decades. Their military value became a significant portion within the Hungarian royal army, which also contributed to the formation of the light cavalry structure. Cumans participated in military campaigns abroad, for instance during the fights against the Duchy of Austria and the Kingdom of Bohemia. In the civil war between King Béla IV and his son Stephen, both sides tried to gain Cuman support. During this conflict, in 1264, Béla sent Cuman troops to fight his son Stephen, despite that the Cumans officially belonged to the suzerainty of the latter, who had taken the title of "Dominus Cumanorum". After Stephen's victory in the civil war, significant number of Cumans intended to leave Hungary amid looting and plunder, however, they were important militarily to the royal authority. Around April 1266, Stephen successfully persuaded them to remain in Hungary, when launched a punitive expedition against them.

After the death of Stephen V in 1272, the 10-year-old Ladislaus IV (subsequently also known as Ladislaus the Cuman) ascended the Hungarian throne under the regency of his mother Elizabeth the Cuman, but in fact, baronial parties administered the kingdom. Hungary fell into feudal anarchy, when various groups fought for supreme power. Between 1277 and 1279, Ladislaus, who was declared to be of age, has temporarily succeeded in domestic and foreign policy.

== Papal initiative ==
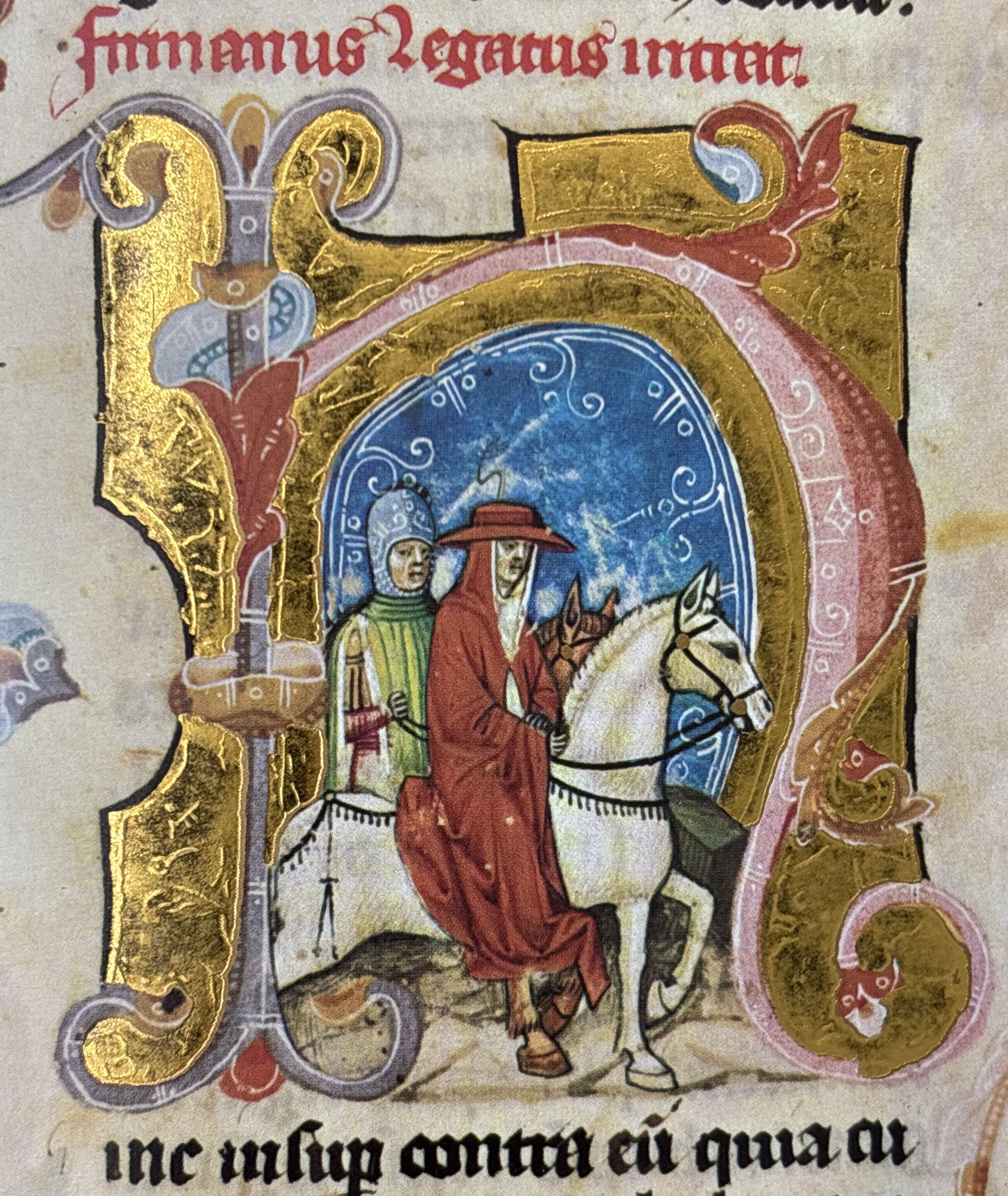
Papal legate Philip, Bishop of Fermo arrives to Hungary, as depicted in the Illuminated Chronicle

Pope Nicholas III appointed Philip of Fermo as papal legate with "full jurisdiction" (legationis officio plene) to Hungary and its adjacent territories, Poland, Dalmatia, Croatia, Bosnia, Serbia, Galicia–Volhynia and Cumania ("ac Polonie, Dalmatie, Croatie, Rame, Servie, Lodomirie, Galitie et Cumanie partibus illi conterminis") on 22 September 1278. Despite Philip was not a member of the College of Cardinals, he was granted the rank legatus a latere, consequently he was the "alter ego" of the pope and thus possessed full plenipotentiary powers. This reflects the importance that the pope attached to the legation. As a result of his rank legatus a latere, Philip was mandated to donate church benefice; he could appoint his clergy as canons in any chapter; he was authorized to grant indulgence; he could also enforce the imposition of his measures with censure (i.e. excommunication, interdict and suspension), in addition to lifting those punishments. Immediately after his appointment, Philip became de facto head of the Catholic Church in Hungary and was able to convene and preside provincial and national synods. He also acted as the supreme appeals forum for church litigation cases. The pope marked his chief duty in assisting King Ladislaus IV of Hungary to consolidate his authority and restore royal power, in addition to defend the rights and freedoms of ecclesiastical institutions against tyrannical secular lords. Philip was also instructed to strive to enforce canon law in Hungary and the neighboring countries. Beyond that, one of his main tasks was to settle the situation of the Archdiocese of Esztergom, which had been sede vacante for 7 years.

The timing of sending the papal legate to Hungary can be traced back to uncertain reasons. Although, the kingdom fell into feudal anarchy in 1272, when the minor Ladislaus was crowned king, and in the following years baronial groups fought for supreme power which also affected serious damage to ecclesiastical property (for instance, the Diocese of Veszprém was ravaged and devastated in 1276), by the time Philip was appointed, Ladislaus IV had achieved significant results in the field of political consolidation: after he was declared to be of age in May 1277, he successfully eliminated the dominion of the Geregye clan, while forcing the powerful Kőszegi family to retreat temporarily. Simultaneously, the joint German–Hungarian army decisively defeated the Bohemians and killed the archenemy King Ottokar II of Bohemia at the Battle on the Marchfeld in August 1278. The 14th-century Illuminated Chronicle emphasizes that Philip came into Hungary specifically due to Ladislaus's non-Christian habits and mores, but there is no trace of this in contemporary sources before the legate's arrival, so the chronicle pointed out this reason retrospectively. Historian Jenő Szűcs argued the papal documents containing the appointment also do not mention any objectionable behavior of the king. Jenő Szűcs and Attila Zsoldos considered the Holy See revived those Gregorian aspirations, which claimed Hungary was a papal fief as Saint Stephen "received the governance and crown" from the Pope in the 11th century, as papal legate Philip declared, when he opened the national synod in Buda. Based on Ottokar aus der Gaal's Steirische Reimchronik ("Styrian Rhyming Chronicle"), historian Viktória Kovács considered the appointment of a papal legate could have been preceded by a request in Hungary. Presumably, some members of the country's ecclesiastical and secular elite were dissatisfied with the king's consolidation efforts and did not trust the monarch. Bruno von Schauenburg, the Bishop of Olomouc (and King Ottokar's advisor) in 1272 already informed Pope Gregory on the "dangerous situation" of Christianity in Hungary, for which he made the Cumans primarily responsible. According to a near-contemporary Austrian chronicle, the Continuatio Vindobonensis, Philip was sent to Hungary not just to convert the Cumans but to "recall the Christian Hungarians, who had nearly forgotten the Christian life [...] to the Catholic faith".

== First law ==
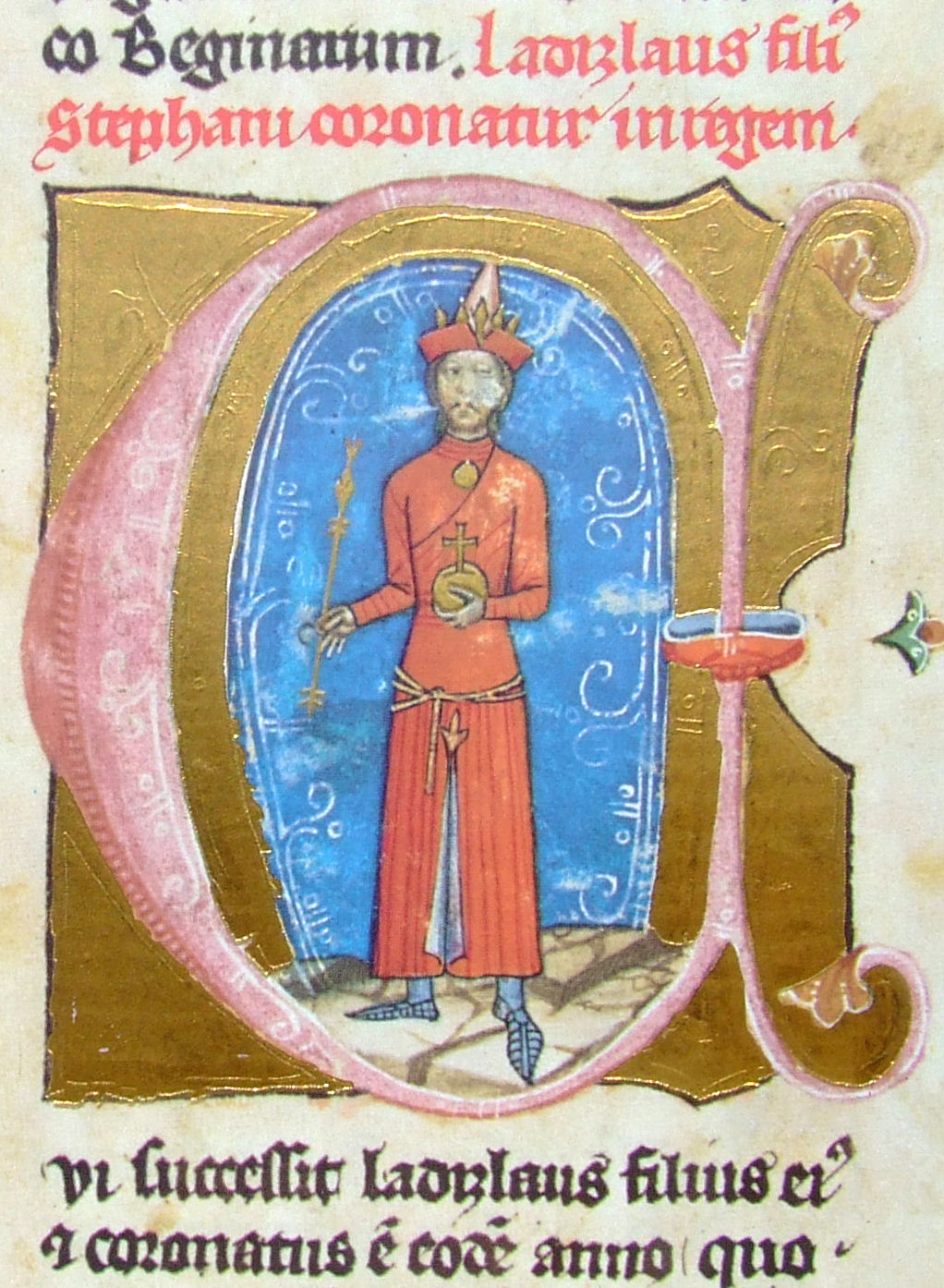
Ladislaus IV in traditional Cuman attire, depicted in Illuminated Chronicle

Shortly after his arrival to Hungary, papal legate Philip was shocked at the presence of thousands of pagan Cumans in the kingdom. Thereafter, Philip marked as his main political-diplomatic task in persuading King Ladislaus IV to withdraw support from the Cumans and in converting them into Christianity. Cumans were important militarily to the royal authority and political stability: disturbing the cause of the Cumans in this way was neither timely nor desirable, as the impatient and violent action of the papal legate in order to convert the Cumans to Christianity and end their nomadic traditions threatened this strategic alliance. On 23 June 1279, Philip convened an assembly to Buda with the participation of the monarch, barons and prelates of the realm, and the Cumans' two chieftains, Usuk and Tolon. During the meeting, the papal legate extracted a ceremonious promise from the Cuman chieftains of giving up their pagan customs, and persuaded the young King Ladislaus to swear an oath to enforce the keeping of the Cuman chieftains' promise. The monarch vowed to settle the Cumans to permanent settlements, to end their violence against Christians, and to return the church and secular estates occupied by the Cumans to their owners.

Some historians considered the 23 June 1279 regulations as the First Cuman Law, while others – e.g. Jenő Szűcs – argued it contained only a "draft" or the legate's dictations ("articuli Cumanorum") for the only Cuman law, a second text as the only binding law issued on 5 or 10 August 1279. András Pálóczi Horváth referred to the August regulations as the Second Cuman Law. In contrast, Nora Berend argued the first text (23 June) is the only authentic binding law. A pro-Ladislaus prelate, vice-chancellor Nicholas Kán formulated the document itself. Taking hostages from all seven Cuman tribes ensured the success of the preparation of the first Cuman law. The articles also prescribed sending papal commissioners (inquisitores) to verify compliance with the provisions of the law.

In the final formula of the charter, the monarch promised to confirm and issue the provisions made so far and to be made at the next diet in the form of a ceremonial privilege (golden bull). The earliest document which preserved the text of the first law is found in the Vatican Apostolic Archive, because, in 1339, Pope Benedict XII entrusted Johannes de Amelio, the archdeacon of Fréjus, to make copies of the documents to be inserted into the papal archives, which were then located in the monastery of Assisi, and then transport them to Avignon.

== Second law ==
A general assembly (generalis congregatio) to Tétény (today a borough of Budapest) was summoned in July 1279, where further laws were set down on 5 or 10 August 1279. In accordance with the legate's demand, the text again prescribed that the Cumans should leave their tents and live "in houses attached to the ground". In addition, the laws recorded the place of the final settlement of the Cumans between the Maros (Mureș) and Körös (Criș) rivers, along the rivers Tisza and Körös, in addition the land between the rivers Temes (Timiș) and Maros, establishing the autonomous Kunság. The charter also stated that the Cuman lords and nobles enjoy the same liberty as the other nobles of the country, are similarly exempt from uninvited accommodation of the royal court, and are obliged to go to war in person as they are at the king's call. Philip was empowered to send investigators (the local bishop, a baron and two local noblemen) – i.e. instead of the legate's inquisitores – to each Cuman tribes (or clans), whose function was to supervise the enforcement of the Cuman law, whilst the Hungarian monarch would hold seven hostages from each clans as an assurance.

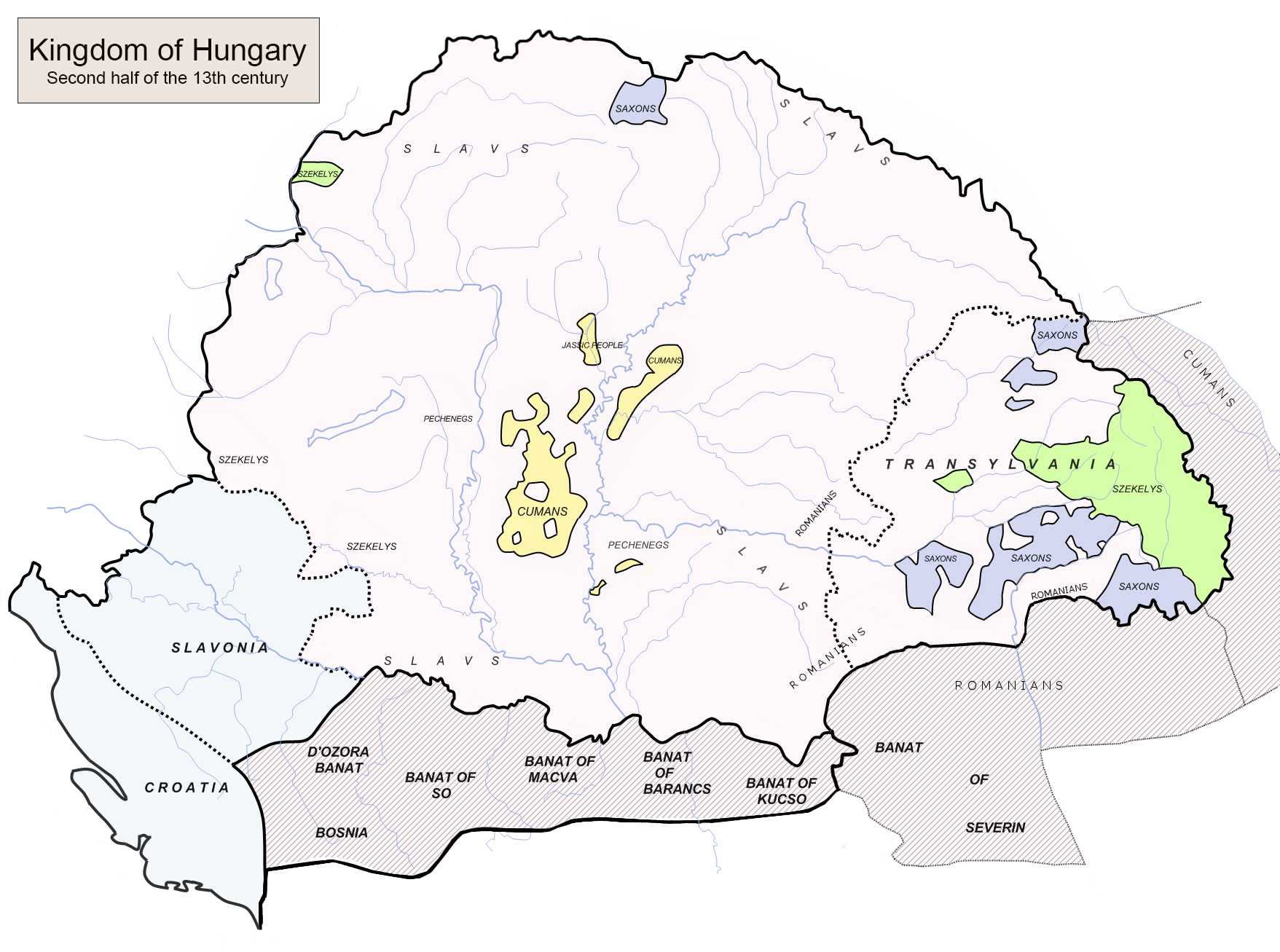
Cuman autonomic area (yellow) following the adoption of the Cuman laws in 1279–1280

Gyula Pauler argued, after the promulgation of the first text, the king and the Cumans managed to persuade Philip to change some of its requirements, and so the second text was promulgated, superseding the first. Pálóczi Horváth considered the attending Cuman chieftains – Alpra and Uzur – managed to obtain certain compromises, as the second document also contained their privileges beside their obligations. Jenő Szűcs considered that it was considered a relief that, contrary to the legate's original rigid demand, the Cumans were not required to "completely" conform to their Christian environment and deny their ethnic traditions; at least they could keep their hair, beards and clothing. A more significant modification was the recognition of the folk-customary unity of the Cuman society in the articles, and the guarantee of its lower-level autonomy – something that was not even mentioned in the legate's draft. It was consecrated that the Cumans' community was directly subordinate to the king in terms of jurisdiction. The existing joint jurisdiction of the Palatine (who simultaneously also served as Judge of the Cumans) and the Cumanian tribal judges in lawsuits with other citizens was confirmed; otherwise, internal matters remained within the jurisdiction of the tribal judges, and the appeal forum remained the king's court. However, all these privileges only applied in the areas where they were required to settle abandoning their nomadic lifestyle. In addition, they had to release the masses of Christian slaves they had brought with them from their foreign campaigns; the second law relaxed the restrictions by allowing non-Christian prisoners to be kept.

According to János Botka, as a result of the privilege, the Cumans became part of the group of conditional nobles, which legal status was gradually lost in later centuries. Miklós Kring argued that Ladislaus IV raised the Cumans to the status of royal servants, a major component of the emerging common nobility with uniform legal status. Pálóczi Horváth argued only the Cuman chieftains and nobles enjoyed a social status similar to the royal servants. This privilege was then forgotten in the following centuries, its content being illusory at the moment of its formulation, reflecting the political interest of the moment.

=== Authenticity ===
Matthias Bel was the first scholar, who explained the document in his work Notitia geograph. Hist. Districtuum Cumano-Jazygum (1730s). It is possible that Bel discovered the charter in an archive (either in Hungary or Austria) while collecting material for his book. Ferenc Subich, a secretary of royal governor Albert Casimir, Duke of Teschen accessed a copy of the document from the Imperial Court Library in Vienna and handed over to Hungarian archivist György Pray, who published in his work Dissertationes historico-criticae in annales veteres Hunnorum, Avarum et Hungarorum (1774). Later historians (e.g. István Katona and György Fejér) published the charter based on Pray's work.

Miklós Kring emphasized that the charter which contains the text of second law does not correspond – for instance, it omits invocatio, inperpetuum and list of dignities – to the form of the ceremonial privilege promised by Ladislaus IV at the issuance of the first law in June 1279. Kring also highlighted that the Second Cuman Law only became known in the second half of the 18th century, and is not referenced before that. According to Kring, when Leopold I confirmed the privileges of the Cumans and Jassic people in 1668, the earliest document mentioning it dates back to 1407. Kring connected the emergence of the second law with the so-called Redemptio in the first half of the 18th century, when Kunság was mortgaged to the Teutonic Order in 1702, resulting a decades of struggle to regain rights by redeeming the pledge and legal petitions. Elements of self-rule were finally restored by Queen Maria Theresa in 1745. Nevertheless, Kring did not consider the entire text as a forgery but he believed that some parts – especially the emphasis on the Cumans as a group with noble status – were added to the original text later.

Archivist Imre Szentpétery, who systematized the charters issued by the kings of Hungary from the Árpád dynasty, registered the text of the second law too based on Pray's publication, but noted the charter itself "is suspicious both in terms of its provenance and content". Szentpétery argued the text asserts the freedom of the "noble" Cumans equal to the nobility of the realm, which, however, has no validity in the future. Altogether, Szentpétery considered the charter is authentic, but in its currently known form it is a much later interpolated revision of the original.

Cuman and Jazygian seats (marked by crescents) within the autonomous territories, c. 1500; Cumans are in green, Jazygians in orange, with shading marking unorganized or assimilated areas of settlement

Nora Berend was the first scholar, who called the Second Cuman Law as an eighteenth-century forgery. Berend argued its issuance contradicts Ladislaus' promise at the closure of the first law (i.e. to confirm and promulgate its text under a golden bull). Berend also considered that the first law was not only a draft or a law overturned in a short time, since the Roman Curia transcribed and copied it in 1339, while the so-called "second law" had only 18th-century manuscripts are known, and the papal inventory does not mention its existence either. Berend argued the "first law" was a binding royal document, a letters patent with royal wax seal, which rules out the possibility of it being a draft. Accepting Kring's argument, Berend claimed the text of the second law was compiled during the Redemptio in the first half of the 18th century, when the Kunság (or Jászkun) district defended its supposed privileges. During that time, many documents were collected as proofs of the legal standing of the district. According to Berend, there is no trace in the records of the Imperial Court Library of any manuscripts of the Cuman law, and there is no original medieval charter or even medieval copy. János Bak accepted Berend's argument, thus not included the text of the second law in his monumental work Online Decreta Regni Mediaevalis Hungariae.

According to Péter Langó, the fact that no copies of a document are known from before the 18th century does not necessarily mean that it did not exist, as they may have been lost since then. Langó argued that the difference in the introductory formula of the two laws precludes the possibility that the second was forged on the basis of the first. Both variants ("salutem in auctore salutis" and "salutem in salutis largitore") are frequently used in royal charters issued by King Ladislaus IV. The arenga (prologue) and narratio of the two texts are significantly different. The first law emphasizes the dependence of the Kingdom of Hungary on the Holy See, which claim was never recognized by the Hungarian kings. This clause is completely absent from the text of the second law, which strengthens the monarch's primacy in church government. Based on the documents, the identity of the Cuman chieftains who were present was different when the two documents were issued (Usuk and Tolon in June, and Alpra and Uzur in August), which would assume that the 18th century forger had extremely serious background knowledge of the 13th century Cuman elite. The text of the second law reflects conditions in the late 1270s (for instance, regarding the designated accommodation areas for Cumans), which were no longer valid in the following decades, in addition to the legal terminology and expressions (e.g. conditional nobility and castle warriors) which had a different meaning by the 14–15th centuries. Langó summarized that the text of the second law can be considered authentic from a formal and philological aspect. Langó also considered possible late additions and interpolations to the authentic text during the 18th-century legal dispute to be implausible, since the disputed parts only refer to the Cuman chieftains ("nobles") and not to the Cumans as a whole, when examined in context. Historian Attila Zsoldos accepted the two 1279 Cuman laws are authentic.

In her 2014 study, Nora Berend rejected Langó's counter-arguments considering that the "implicit equation between the status of the two groups [Cuman chieftains and nobles] also appears when the king promises not to ask for hospitality from the lords, nobles and people of the Cumans, in the same way that he does not ask hospitality from nobles". She also emphasized that there is no trace of the text's existence prior to the mid-18th century. The forgers incorporated much of the authentic 23 June document, in addition to other medieval charters. Berend also emphasized that the text of second law – which is the only source for their alleged noble status, and for the royal grant to them of their settlements in Kunság – contradicts the medieval status of the Cumans. Berend argued when the Hungarian nobles protested against the sale of the Jassic–Cuman district in 1702, they referred to the Cumans' oldest privileges in 1485. According to her, the first mention of the so-called "Second Cuman Law" occurred on 25 March 1745 as part of the documentation offered to the Lieutenancy Council for the negotiations concerning Redemptio. Its text started to be copied widely in the 1760s and probably one of these copies – via Adam Franz Kollár, who placed it to the collection of the Imperial Court Library – was "the original" of Pray's edition of 1774. Nora Berend concluded that the text of the Second Cuman Law "helped forge a common identity in the service of political goals".

Szilvia Somogyi proved that manuscripts of the Second Cuman Law existed before the 18th century, thus it cannot be connected to the legal-political struggle surrounding the Redemptio and it contradicts Nora Berend's claim. A 17th-century codex (Cod. 8219), which contains the text of the law in two copies, located in the Austrian National Library was already referred by Jesuit scholar Franz Karl Alter in his work Philologisch-kritische Miscellaneen (1799), then Hungarian archivist János Csontosi (1884). The 19 manuscripts on various topics were collected into a codex by court librarian Sebastian Tengnagel, who served in this capacity from 1608 to 1636. Somogyi argued both manuscripts (42r and 48r) of the second law have Humanist style characteristics, the spelling and punctuation of the Latin text indicate that both were written after the middle of the 16th century. A detail of the titles ("sunt anni 297") perhaps suggests that the copies were recorded in 1576. Both texts provide a different date, 5 August 1279, as the time of issuance of the law. Another charter from the Batthány Archives (Acta misc. Heim. n. 9.) is also a 16th-century copy of the Second Cuman Law, with the date 5 August 1279. It was recorded possibly during the reign of Ferdinand I. Somogyi argued all three copies can be traced back to the same common archetype. Somogyi considered that the letter of Pope Nicholas III from 9 December 1279 implies that the Roman Curia was aware of the negotiation processes of the past months and refers to the different passages of the two Cuman laws, thus confirming the contemporary (i.e. 13th-century) existence of the Second Cuman Law.

Dániel Bagi argued that both the protocollum (prologue) and eschatocollum (conclusion) of the charter correspond to the practice of the Hungarian royal chancellery from the 1270s, i.e. the original text was written in the chancellery of Ladislaus IV. Bagi also considered that the authenticity of the document is strengthened by the fact that the phrase "et simpliciter omnibus nobilibus de Cumanis" ("and simply to all the nobles of the Cumans") refers only to the leading class of the Cumans, and not to the community as a whole. The charter was not a privilege letter, but a document which confirmed the agreement between papal legate Philip and the Hungarian court concluded after negotiations. The so-called second Cuman law defines the group as a legal community, similarly to the Transylvanian Saxons and Zipser Germans, in accordance with the legal ideas of corporatism which arose in the last third of the 13th century in Hungary.

== Aftermath ==
Jenő Szűcs argued that it was the "noble" Cuman free middle class, living in clan bonds and relatively still populous – that is, the tribe of the Cuman army – that adhered to nomadism; this stratum was also threatened with economic collapse if the Cuman law was indeed implemented and its servants were freed, since their strength was provided by the foreign servant class usual in the nomadic structure, which provided the labor force for the additional farming around the winter camps. Szűcs considered that the rise of Cuman question were made "artificially", which proved to be "fatal", which upset the delicate balance between the monarch, the Hungarian barons and prelates, and the Cumans. Their persecution ultimately shattered the foundations of internal consolidation, which has achieved results in the previous two years. Szűcs emphasized the bishops were forced to bow their heads before Philip's "authoritarian violence", some of the nobility was defeated by demagoguery, and the rebellion matured among the Cumans. Consequently, the young king drifted into an unresolved conflict situation at once: if he did not want to get into a vacuum, one of his choices was worse than the other. For Ladislaus IV, fulfilling the papal will would have been a political suicide. Much of it may have been due to the military power of the Cumans who were stably behind him, and the settlement and Christianization of the Cumans would naturally have led to its loss. At the same time, "the denial of the ecclesiastical will, on the other hand, meant embracing exclusion from the Christian world, which was also tantamount to the complete impossibility of exercising power."

Implementation of the laws was delayed, however, because the commoners from the Cuman tribes did not obey the laws, and Ladislaus IV, himself a half-Cuman, failed to force them, despite his oath that he would even start a war against the Cumans if the law was sabotaged. In retaliation, Bishop Philip excommunicated him and some of his strongest allies, for instance Nicholas Kán, and placed Hungary under interdict in early October 1279. According to Nora Berend, Ladislaus' behaviour shifted the focus from Hungary's non-Christians to the king's person during the conflict, even though Ladislaus was himself a Christian. After the proclamation of the ecclesiastical censure, the king was forced to retreat and promise again to enforce the Cuman law in the first half of the month. The confrontation caused a rift within the baronial elite, which led to the reorganization of the royal council, while the prelates submitted themselves to the will of the Holy See, even though the restoration of royal power was in their best interests. However, reconciliation between Ladislaus and Philip proved to be only temporary, and the Hungarian monarch left the capital for Semlak in Temes County (Tiszántúl) and settled among the Cumans, finally choosing the latter in his intractable dilemma. Two clerics, former archbishop-elect Nicholas Kán and Gregory, the Grand Provost of Esztergom joined him, possibly along with other faithful courtiers. Ladislaus IV even appealed to the Holy See, but the pope refused to absolve him from the excommunication. On 9 December 1279, Pope Nicholas III sent a letter to the king, in which he rebuked him for his resistance and for his pagan customs and Cuman concubines (thus Aydua, the most famous of them). The pope also sent letters to all barons, prelates and churches of the realm in which he called for support for the policies of papal legate Philip.

By that time, Nicholas Kán fell ill and fled the entourage of the king. Feeling of impending death, he confessed his sins and requested his family to take his corpse before the papal legate. After his death, Philip ordered to bury him in the cemetery of the lepers in Buda, where his corpse was stoned, as his excommunication had not been released. Ladislaus was enraged by the incident and his confidants captured and imprisoned Philip of Fermo in late December 1279 or early January 1280. Thereafter, Ladislaus handed over the legate to the Cumans. The Steirische Reimchronik preserved that the Cumans "took him [Philip] to the place where they used to shoot with an arrow, they wanted to shoot arrow into him and shed his blood". This escalation completely alienated the Hungarian lords from the monarch: as a result, they – under the leadership of Palatine Matthew Csák – decided to imprison the king. Sometime after 17 January 1280, when Ladislaus stayed in Beszterce near Transylvania (present-day Bistrița, Romania), Voivode of Transylvania Finta Aba captured Ladislaus and handed him over to Roland Borsa, who held the king in custody. Both parties corresponded abroad in order to resolve the conflict. Upon the request of Charles I of Sicily, Pope Nicholas III sent his envoys to Hungary. As a result, both the legate and the king were set free within a month, in February 1280. Subsequently, Paschasius, the Provost of Pressburg (today Bratislava, Slovakia) mediated the peace between Ladislaus and Philip. The Steirische Reimchronik incorrectly claims that immediately after his liberation, Philip left Hungary for Italy, and "arriving to Zadar, he swore to God that the king and all of his men could become a pagan from his apart, he would no longer set foot on Hungarian soil". Ladislaus IV took a new oath to enforce the Cuman laws.

Coat-of-arms of Kunság (Cumania)

The escalation of the Cuman question had long-lasting consequences for the history of Hungary. Many Cumans decided to leave Hungary instead of obeying the legate's demands. This fundamentally endangered the effectiveness of the Hungarian military capability. Ladislaus gathered an army around October 1280 and chased the outgoing Cumans as far as Szalánkemén (now Stari Slankamen in Serbia) and also crossed the border at the Carpathians. Ladislaus IV successfully persuaded the Cumans to return to Hungary during the military campaign to Transalpina under unknown circumstances. Two years later, however, rebellion broke out around July 1282 among the Cumans who were forced to return earlier. They looted and pillaged the region between the rivers Tisza and Maros. This conflict elevated into the Battle of Lake Hód in September or October 1282. András Pálóczi Horváth emphasized the Cumans' defeat at Lake Hód resulted "a reduction in the Cuman population in Hungary, and with this their economic and military strength was also greatly diminished", which highly affected the efficiency of the royal authority. According to Jenő Szűcs, the territory between the rivers Maros and Körös, in addition to Temesköz (Banat) ceased to be Cuman-inhabited areas following the battle. Royal power completely collapsed for the remaining part of Ladislaus' reign, while the oligarchs began to administer their provinces independently of the king. The era of feudal anarchy lasted until the 1320s.

Archaeologist Gábor Hatházi argued that Andrew III of Hungary annulled the Second Cuman Law with his decrees of 1290. György Györffy argued the Cuman laws and their subsequent defeat at Lake Hód marked the beginning of the "feudalization" (i.e. social integration) of the Cuman subjects to the political, social and cultural structure of majority society, which lasted throughout the 14th century. At the same time, the Cumans appear less and less in contemporary sources as a separate entity, which indicate their complete social, linguistic and cultural assimilation to the Hungarian nation despite their surviving privileged territory called Kunság until the late 19th century. When the debate revived in the 18th century, the leaders of the Kunság region projected the political thinking of their own time – based on legal continuity and a legal system with permanent validity since the Tripartitum – onto the documents of the 13th century – when legislation was characterized by ad hoc royal decisions –, erroneously assuming a noble status for themselves. Both laws were identified by several historians as roots of the later rights of self-government, which the Cumanian community held until the late 19th century.

== Sources ==
- Bagi, Dániel (2023). "The So-Called Cuman Law in Hungary in the Thirteenth Century". In Wiszewski, Przemysław (ed.). Legal Norms and Political Action in Multi-Ethnic Societies. Cohesion in Multi-Ethnic Societies in Europe from c. 1000 to the Present, III. Brepols. pp. 121–129. ISBN 978-2-503-60230-1.
- Berend, Nora (2001). At the Gate of Christendom: Jews, Muslims and "Pagans" in Medieval Hungary, c. 1000–c.1300. Cambridge University Press. ISBN 978-0-521-02720-5.
- Berend, Nora (2014). "Forging the Cuman Law, Forging an Identity". In Bak, János M.; Geary, Patrick J.; Klaniczay, Gábor (eds.). Manufacturing a Past for the Present: Forgery and Authenticity in Medievalist Texts and Objects in Nineteenth-Century Europe. Brill. pp. 109–128. ISBN 978-90-04-27680-2.
- Györffy, György (1953). "A kunok feudalizálódása [The Feudalization of the Cumans]". In Székely, György (ed.). Tanulmányok a parasztság történetéhez Magyarországon a 14. században (in Hungarian). Akadémiai Kiadó. pp. 248–275.
- Kovács, Viktória (2019). "Alter ego domini papae Nicolai III. Fülöp fermói püspök, szentszéki legátus magyarországi tevékenysége (1279–1281) [Alter ego domini papae Nicolai III. The Activity of Philip, Bishop of Fermo and Legate of the Holy See in Hungary (1279–1281)]". In Kiss, Gergely (ed.). Varietas delectat. A pápai–magyar kapcsolatok sokszínűsége a 11–14. században (in Hungarian). Pécsi Tudományegyetem BTK TTI Középkori és Koraújkori Történeti Tanszék. pp. 117–166. ISBN 978-963-429-394-1.
- Kring, Miklós (1932). "Kun és jász társadalomelemek a középkorban, I. és II. közlemény [Cuman and Iasian Society Elements in the Middle Ages, Vol. 1. & 2.]". Századok (in Hungarian). 66 (1–3, 4–6). Magyar Történelmi Társulat: 35–63, 169–188. ISSN 0039-8098.
- Langó, Péter (2006). "Kun László kun törvényei. Megjegyzések a kunok jogállásáról a középkori magyar források tükrében [The Cuman Laws of Ladislaus the Cuman. Notes on the Legal Status of the Cumans in the Light of Medieval Hungarian Sources]". In Bathó, Edit; Ujváry, Zoltán (eds.). Jászok és kunok magyarok között. Ünnepi kötet Bánkiné Molnár Erzsébet tiszteletére (in Hungarian). A Jász Múzeumért Alapítvány. pp. 60–77. ISBN 978-963-7113-17-8.
- Pálóczi Horváth, András (1989). Pechenegs, Cumans, Iasians: Steppe Peoples in Medieval Hungary. Corvina. ISBN 963-13-2740-X.
- Pauler, Gyula (1899). A magyar nemzet története az Árpád-házi királyok alatt, II. [The History of the Hungarian Nation during the Árpádian Kings, Vol. 2.] (in Hungarian). Athenaeum.
- Somogyi, Szilvia (2022). "IV. László úgynevezett második kun törvényének korai másolatai [The Early Copies of King Ladislaus IV's So-called Second Cuman Law]". Századok (in Hungarian). 156 (6). Magyar Történelmi Társulat: 1141–1166. ISSN 0039-8098.
- Szentpétery, Imre (1961). Az Árpád-házi királyok okleveleinek kritikai jegyzéke II. kötet 2–3. füzet, 1272–1290 [A Critical Register of Royal Charters from the House of Árpád, Vol. 2. No. 2–3.] (in Hungarian). Magyar Országos Levéltár.
- Szűcs, Jenő (2002). Az utolsó Árpádok [The Last Árpáds] (in Hungarian). Osiris Kiadó. ISBN 963-389-271-6.
- Zsoldos, Attila (1997). "Téténytől a Hód-tóig. Az 1279 és 1282 közötti évek politikatörténetének vázlata [From Tétény to Hód Lake: Outline of the Political History of the Years Between 1279 and 1282]". Történelmi Szemle (in Hungarian). 39 (1). Hungarian Academy of Sciences: 69–98. ISSN 0040-9634.
- Zsoldos, Attila (2022). "Kérdések a jászok magyarországi történetének korai szakaszához [Questions Regarding the Early History of the Iasians in Hungary]". In Bagi, Dániel; Barabás, Gábor; Fedeles, Tamás; Kiss, Gergely (eds.). Ruscia – Hungaria – Europa. Ünnepi kötet Font Márta professzor asszony 70. születésnapjára (in Hungarian). Kronosz Kiadó. pp. 700–717. ISBN 978-615-6339-45-4.
