= Jász-Nagykun-Szolnok County (former) =

Former Hungarian administrative county in central Hungary

Jász-Nagykun-Szolnok County Comitatus Jazyga et Cumania Maior et Szolnokiensis (Latin) Jász-Nagykun-Szolnok vármegye (Hungarian) Komitat Jaß-Großkumanien-Sollnock (German)
- County of the Kingdom of Hungary
- 1876–1950
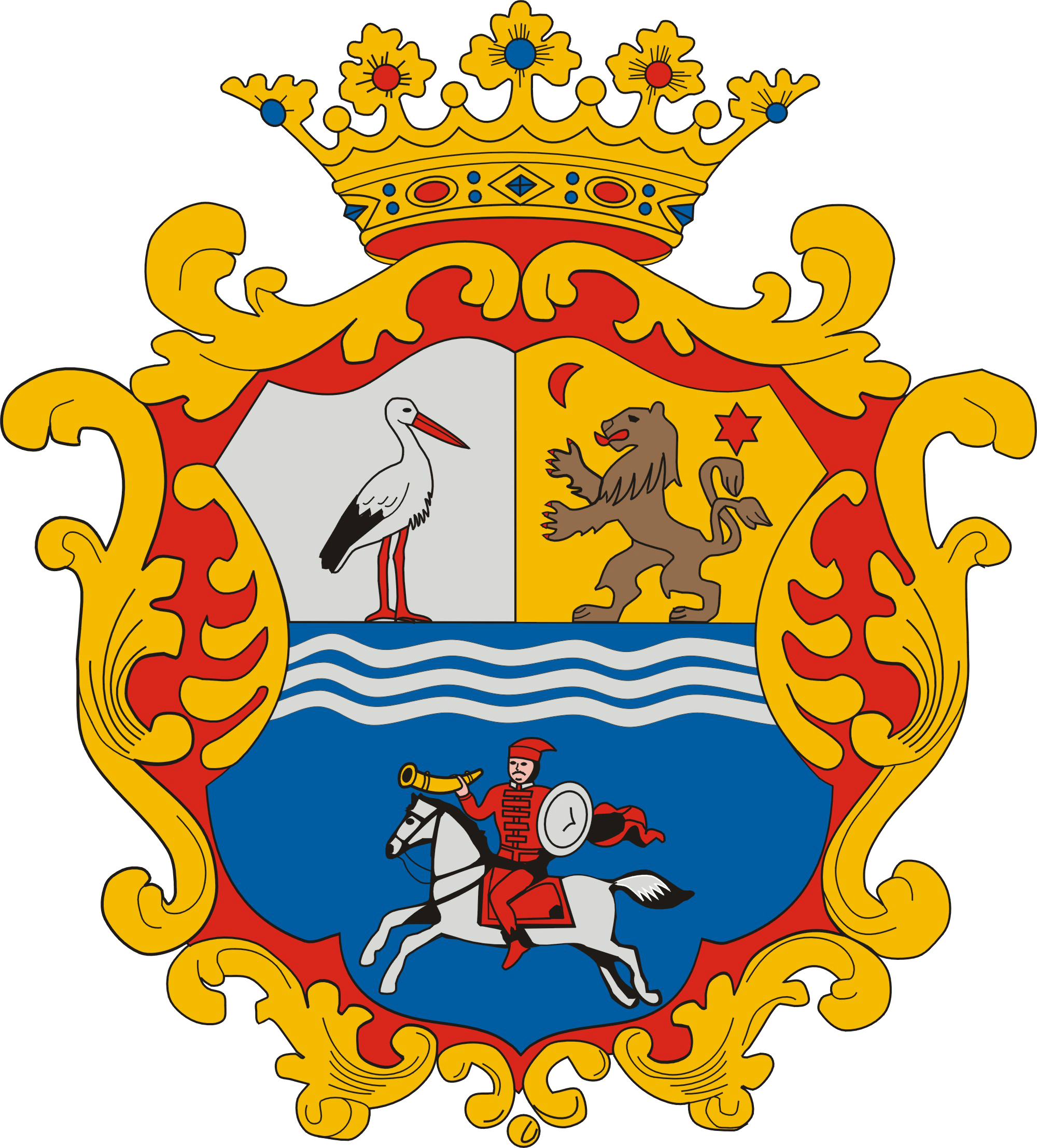
- Coat of arms

- Capital: Szolnok
- Area
  - Coordinates: 47°10′N 20°11′E
  - 1910: 5,251 km^{2} (2,027 sq mi)
- Population
  - 1910: 373,964
- History
  - Established: 1876
  - administrative division reform: 1 February 1950
- Today part of: Hungary

Jász-Nagykun-Szolnok was an administrative county (comitatus) in the Kingdom of Hungary. Its territory, which is now in central Hungary, was slightly smaller than that of present Jász-Nagykun-Szolnok county. The capital of the county was Szolnok.

== Geography ==
Jász-Nagykun-Szolnok county shared borders with the Hungarian counties Pest-Pilis-Solt-Kiskun, Heves, Hajdú, Békés, and Csongrád. The rivers Tisza and Körös flow through the county. Its area was 5,251 km^{2} (2,027 sq mi) around 1910.

== History ==
Jász-Nagykun-Szolnok county was formed in 1876 from the territories of the Külső-Szolnok part of Heves-Külső-Szolnok County, the Jászság (Jazygia) and the Nagykunság (great Cumania). After World War II, the territory of the county was modified: the area on the left bank of the Tisza around Tiszafüred was taken from Heves county, and the area around Dévaványa went to Békés county.

The term Jász originates from the Jassic people (cf. Alans) who moved to this area of Hungary from the Pontic steppes sometime in the 13th century.

== Demographics ==
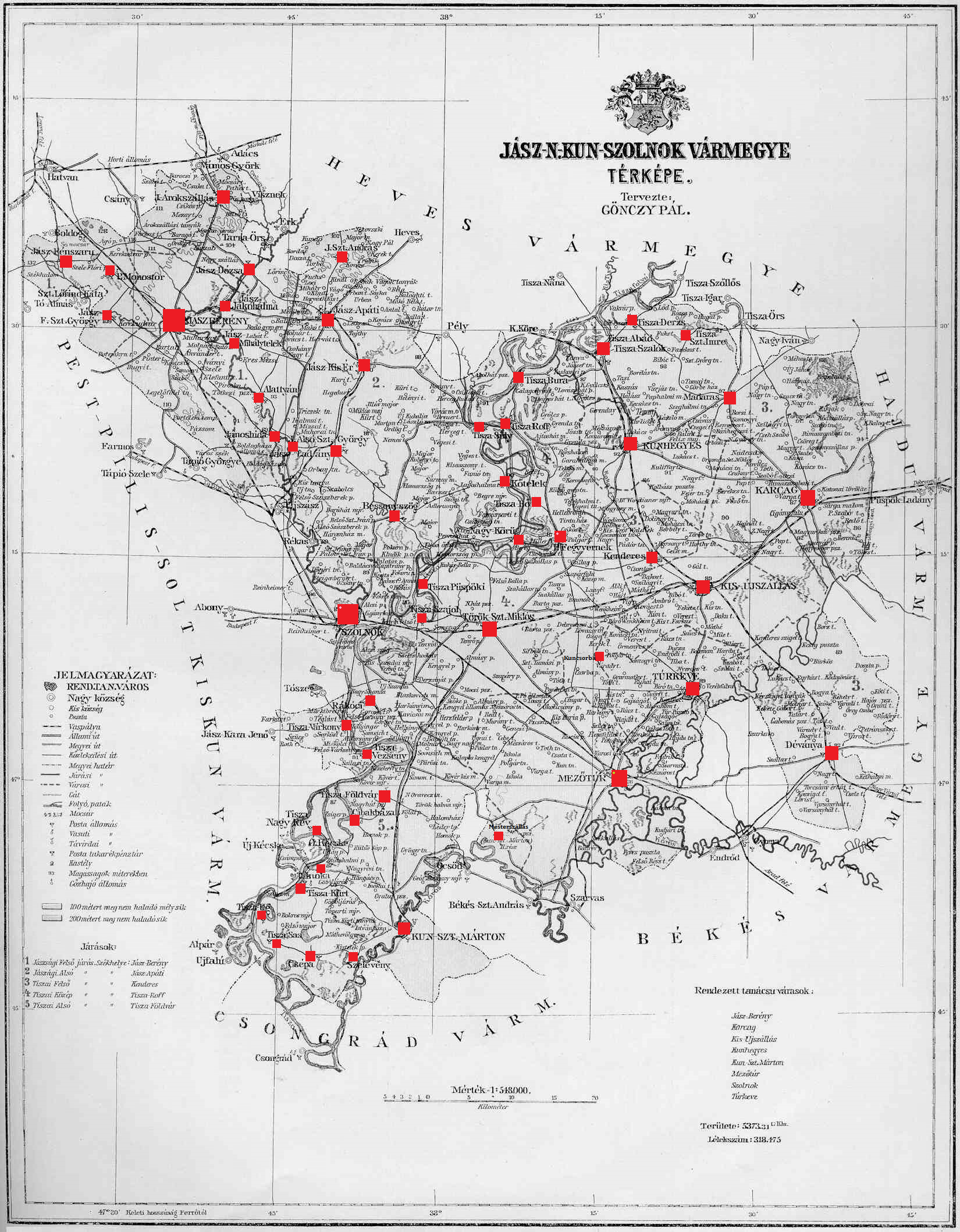
Ethnic map of the county with data of the 1910 census (see the key in the description).

Population by mother tongue (Note: Only linguistic communities > 1% are displayed.)
Census	Total	Hungarian	Other or unknown
1880	278,443	263,994 (98.86%)	3,036 (1.14%)
1890	318,475	315,387 (99.03%)	3,088 (0.97%)
1900	350,269	348,050 (99.37%)	2,219 (0.63%)
1910	373,964	372,423 (99.59%)	1,541 (0.41%)

Population by religion (Note: Only religious communities > 1% are displayed.)
Census	Total	Roman Catholic	Calvinist	Jewish	Other or unknown
1880	278,443	154,261 (55.40%)	113,192 (40.65%)	8,319 (2.99%)	2,671 (0.96%)
1890	318,475	180,538 (56.69%)	124,437 (39.07%)	10,005 (3.14%)	3,495 (1.10%)
1900	350,269	204,306 (58.33%)	131,120 (37.43%)	10,707 (3.06%)	4,136 (1.18%)
1910	373,964	225,111 (60.20%)	133,462 (35.69%)	10,313 (2.76%)	5,078 (1.36%)

== Subdivisions ==
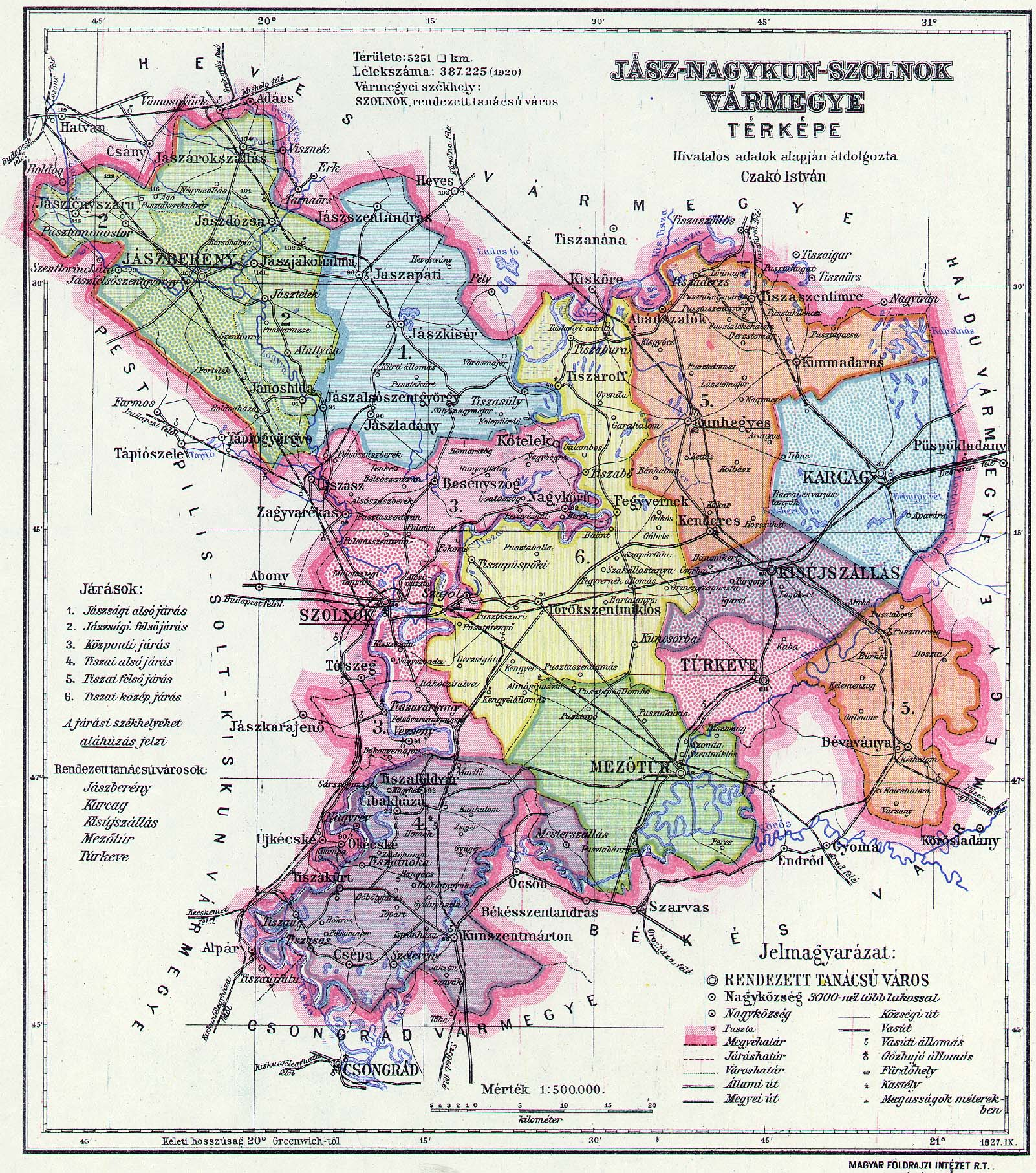

In the early 20th century, the subdivisions of Jász-Nagykun-Szolnok county were:

Districts (járás)
District	Capital
Jászság alsó	Jászapáti
Jászság felső	Jászberény
Tisza alsó	Tiszaföldvár
Tisza felső	Kunhegyes
Tisza közép	Törökszentmiklós
Urban districts (rendezett tanácsú város)
Jászberény
Karcag
Kisújszállás
Mezőtúr
Szolnok
Túrkeve
