= Pest-Pilis-Solt-Kiskun County =

County of the Kingdom of Hungary

Pest-Pilis-Solt-Kiskun County Comitatus Pestiensis et Pilisiensis et Soltensis et Cumania Minor (Latin) Pest-Pilis-Solt-Kiskun vármegye (Hungarian) Komitat Pest-Pilisch-Scholt-Kleinkumanien (German)
- County of the Kingdom of Hungary (1876-1946); County of the Second Hungarian Republic (1946-1949); County of the Hungarian People's Republic (1949-1950)
- Coat of arms

- Capital: Budapest
- Area
  - Coordinates: 47°30′N 19°2′E
  - 1910: 12,228 km^{2} (4,721 sq mi)
- Population
  - 1910: 1,978,041
- History
  - Established: 1876
  - Disestablished: 1 February 1950
- Today part of: Hungary

Pest-Pilis-Solt-Kiskun is the name of an administrative county (comitatus) of the Kingdom of Hungary. Its territory is now in central Hungary, comprising roughly the territory of the present Hungarian county Pest and the northern part of present Bács-Kiskun county. The capital of the county was Budapest.

== Geography ==
The Pest-Pilis-Solt-Kiskun county shared borders with the counties Komárom, Esztergom, Hont, Nógrád, Heves, Jász-Nagykun-Szolnok, Csongrád, Bács-Bodrog, Tolna and Fejér. Its territory covered the eastern bank of the river Danube from Visegrád in the north to (excluding) Baja in the south, stretching to the river Tisza in the east. A part of the county (Pilis) was on the west bank of the Danube, near Budapest. Its area was 12,228 km^{2} around 1910. It was the largest and by far the most populous county of Hungary.

== History ==
The counties Pest and Pilis were formed in the 11th century. Pest was the area on the left (east) bank of the Danube around present-day Budapest, Pilis was on the opposite bank. They were united and became the political, cultural and economical centre of Hungary. The Solt region (the left bank of the Danube south of Ráckeve), which previously belonged to Fejér county, was incorporated into Pest-Pilis-Solt county in the 17th century. Kiskunság (Little Cumania) was added in 1876, creating Pest-Pilis-Solt-Kiskun county.

After World War II, the county was split into two roughly equal parts. The northern part became Pest county, the southern part merged with Bács-Bodrog county to form Bács-Kiskun county.

== Demographics ==
=== 1900 ===
In 1900, the county had a population of 1,615,729 people and was composed of the following linguistic communities:

Total:

- Hungarian: 1,317,237 (81.5%)
- German: 201,285 (12.4%)
- Slovak: 58,533 (3.6%)
- Serbian: 6,199 (0.4%)
- Croatian: 2,372 (0.2%)
- Romanian: 1,664 (0.1%)
- Ruthenian: 234 (0.0%)
- Other or unknown: 28,205 (1.8%)

According to the census of 1900, the county was composed of the following religious communities:

Total:

- Roman Catholic: 1,046,868 (64.8%)
- Calvinist: 252,188 (15.6%)
- Jewish: 201,117 (12.5%)
- Lutheran: 96,863 (6.0%)
- Greek Orthodox: 8,563 (0.5%)
- Greek Catholic: 6,949 (0.4%)
- Unitarian: 1,219 (0.0%)
- Other or unknown: 1,962 (0.1%)

=== 1910 ===
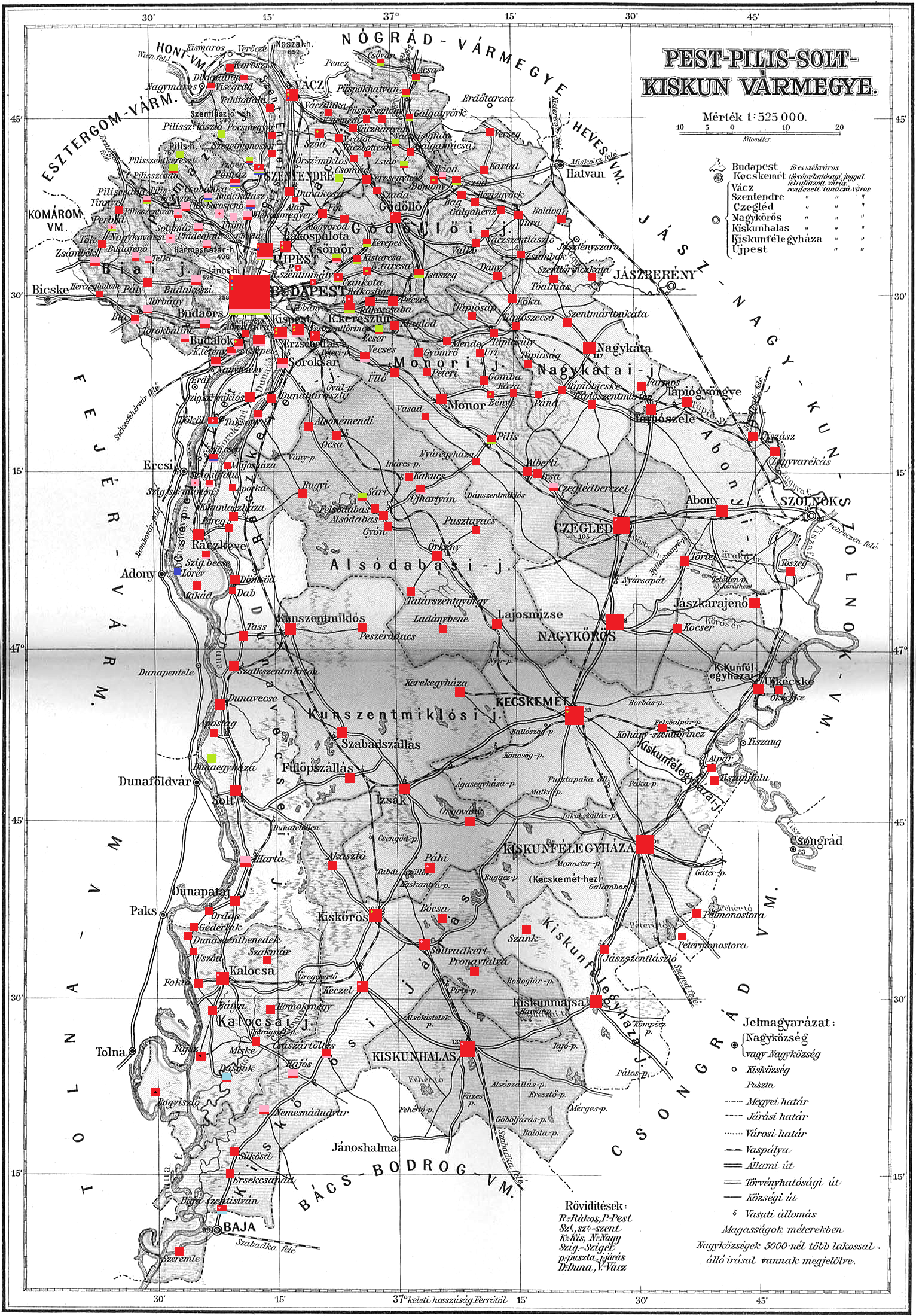
Ethnographic map of the county with data of the 1910 census (see key in the description).

In 1910, the county had a population of 1,978,041 people and was composed of the following linguistic communities:

- Hungarian: 1,728,473 (87.4%)
- German: 162,824 (8.2%)
- Slovak: 47,149 (2.4%)
- Serbian: 7,934 (0.4%)
- Croatian: 3,419 (0.2%)
- Romanian: 3,357 (0.2%)
- Ruthenian: 306 (0.0%)
- Other or unknown: 24,579 (1.2%)

According to the census of 1910, the county was composed of the following religious communities:

Total:

- Roman Catholic: 1,293,265 (65.4%)
- Calvinist: 296,223 (15.0%)
- Jewish: 245,157 (12.4%)
- Lutheran: 113,094 (5.7%)
- Greek Catholic: 12,169 (0.6%)
- Greek Orthodox: 12,001 (0.6%)
- Unitarian: 2,526 (0.1%)
- Other or unknown: 3,606 (0.2%)

== Subdivisions ==
Before approx. 1897, the subdivisions of Pest-Pilis-Solt-Kiskun were (felső is upper, közép is middle, alsó is lower):

Districts (járás)
| District | Capital |
|---|---|
| Kecskemét alsó | Tápiószele |
| Kecskemét felső | Nagykáta |
| Kiskun alsó | Kiskunfélegyháza |
| Kiskun felső | Kunszentmiklós |
| Pest alsó | Ráckeve |
| Pest felső | Irsa |
| Pest közép | Alsódabas |
| Pilis alsó | Tinnye |
| Pilis felső | Pomáz |
| Solt alsó | Kiskőrös |
| Solt felső | Dömsöd |
| Solt közép | Kalocsa |
| Vác alsó | Pécel |
| Vác felső | Vác |
Urban counties (törvényhatósági jogú város)
Budapest (főváros)
Kecskemét
Urban districts (rendezett tanácsú város)
Cegléd
Kiskunfélegyháza
Kiskunhalas
Nagykőrös
Szentendre
Vác

After about 1897, the subdivisions of Pest-Pilis-Solt-Kiskun were:

Districts (járás)
| District | Capital |
|---|---|
| Abony | Abony |
| Alsódabas | Alsódabas |
| Aszód | Aszód |
| Bia | Bia |
| Dunavecse | Dunavecse |
| Gödöllő | Gödöllő |
| Kalocsa | Kalocsa |
| Kiskőrös | Kiskőrös |
| Kiskunfélegyháza | Kiskunfélegyháza |
| Kispest | Kispest |
| Kunszentmiklós | Kunszentmiklós |
| Monor | Monor |
| Nagykáta | Nagykáta |
| Ráckeve | Ráckeve |
| Pomáz | Pomáz |
| Vác | Vác |
Urban counties (törvényhatósági jogú város)
Budapest (főváros)
Kecskemét
Urban districts (rendezett tanácsú város)
Cegléd
Kiskunfélegyháza
Kiskunhalas
Nagykőrös
Szentendre
Újpest (from 1907)
Vác

== Gallery ==
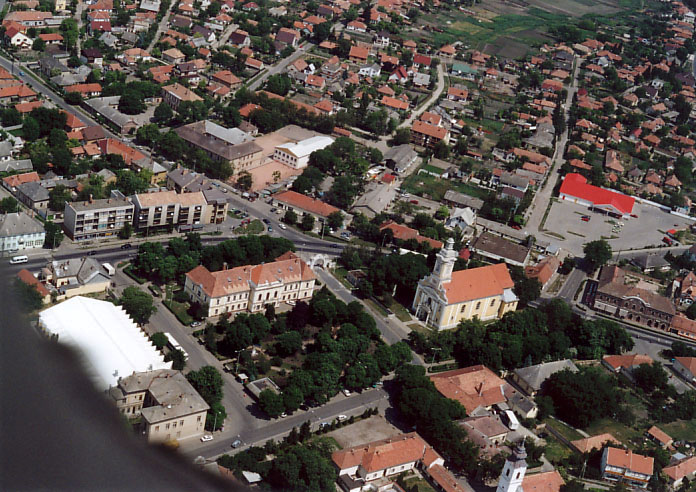
Aerial photography: Abony

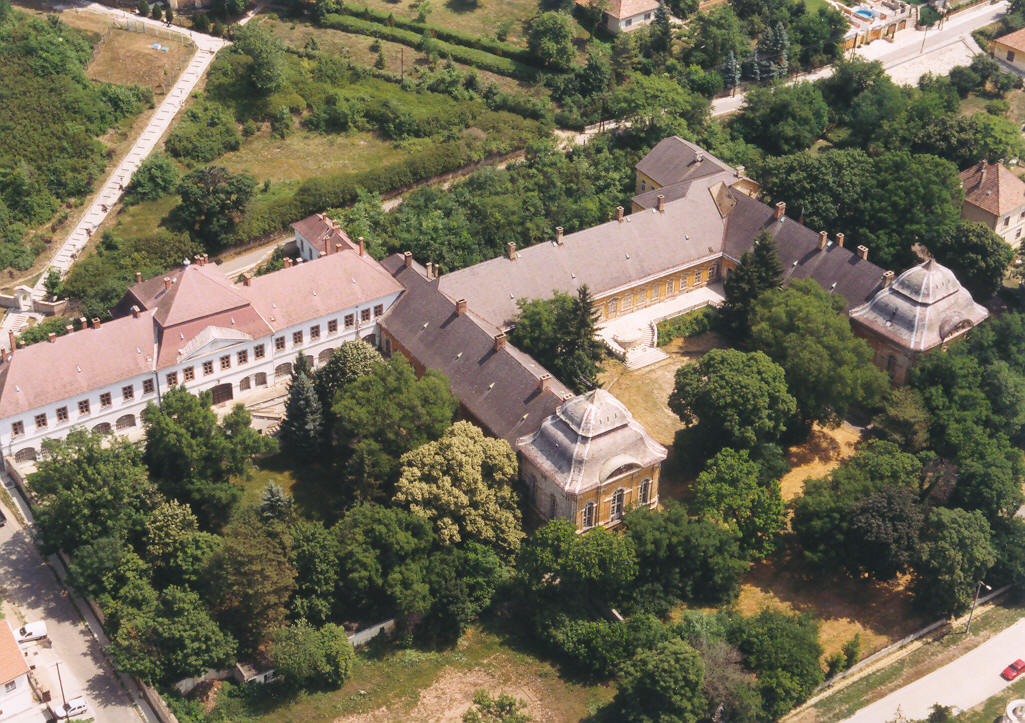
Aerial photography: Aszód- palace

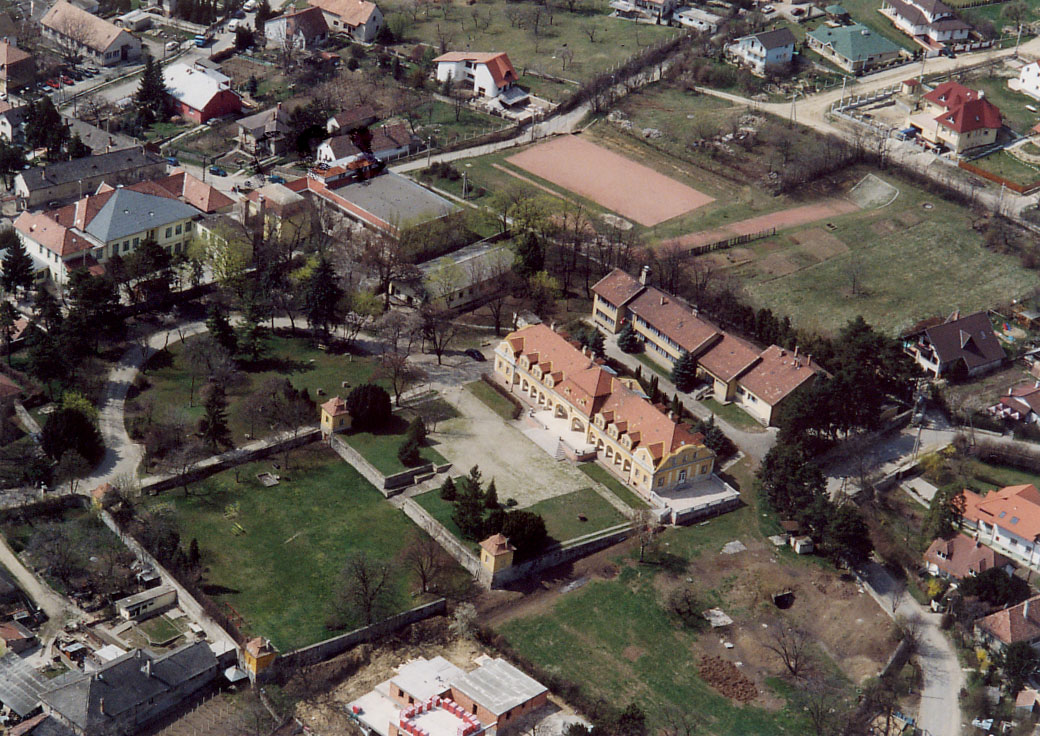
Pomáz - Palace from above
