= Nagykunság =

Historical Cuman region of central Hungary

Coordinates: 46°55′N 20°15′E

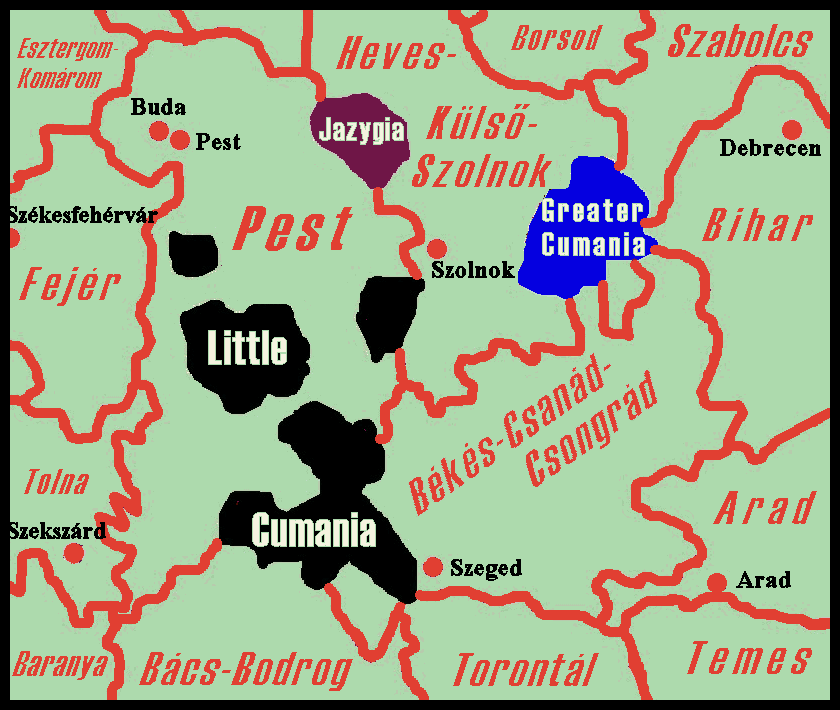
Greater Cumania in the 18th century within the Kingdom of Hungary

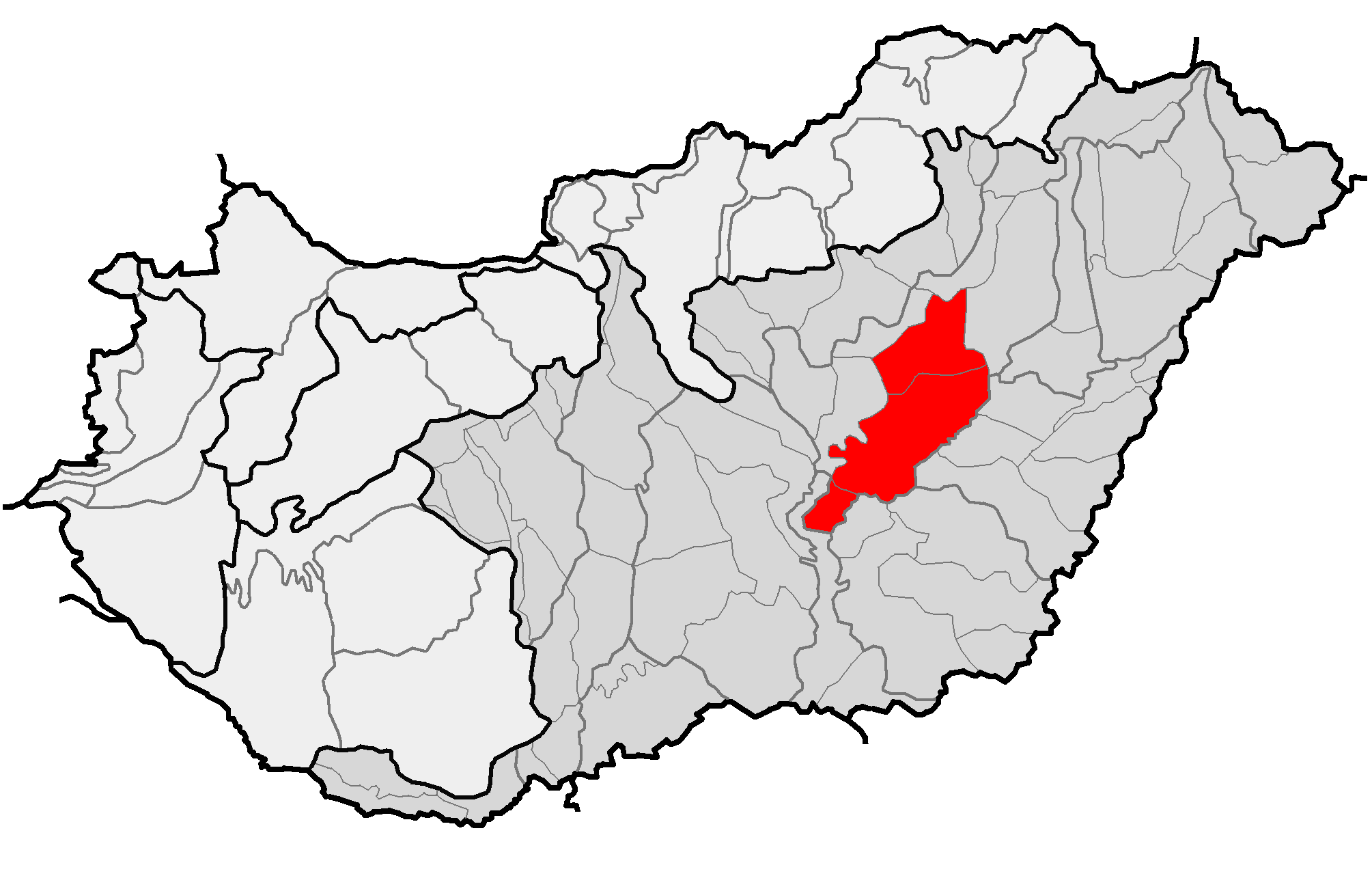
Location of present-day Greater Kumania within physical subdivisions of Hungary

Nagykunság ("Greater Cumania", Latin: Cumania Major) is a historical and geographical region in Hungary situated in the current Jász-Nagykun-Szolnok county between Szolnok and Debrecen. Like other historical European regions called Cumania, it is named for the Cumans, a nomadic tribe of pagan Kipchaks that settled the area. Its territory is 1,196 km^{2}.

== See also ==
- Kunság (Cumania)
- Kiskunság (Little Cumania)
