= Kiskunság =

Historical Cuman region of central Hungary

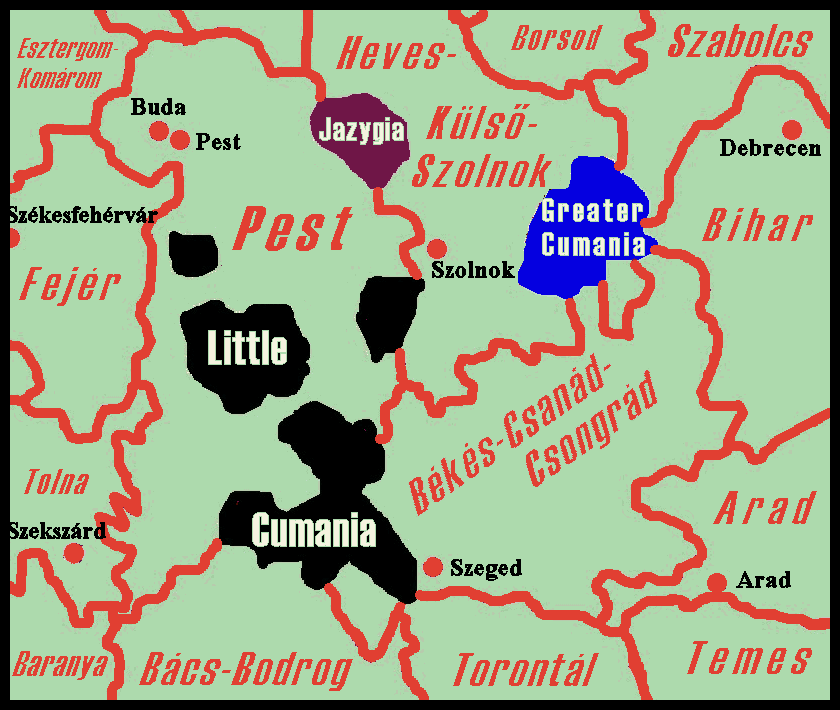
Little Cumania in the 18th century within the Kingdom of Hungary

Kiskunság (literally "Little Cumania" or "Lesser Cumania", Latin: Cumania Minor) is a historical and geographical region in Hungary situated in the current Bács-Kiskun County between Kalocsa and Szeged. Its territory is 2,423 km^{2}. Like other historical European regions called Cumania, it is named for the Cumans (Hungarian: Kunok), a historically very significant nomadic tribe whose population settled amongst numerous peoples to whose land they migrated. The Carpathian Basin was a major area to which this migration occurred.

== Geography ==
Its most defining feature is the sand dunes created by the flat area's windy nature, and bigger dunes being created by deposits of and the old path of the Danube and Tisza.

== See also ==
- Kunság (Cumania)
- Nagykunság (Greater Cumania)
- Kiskunság National Park
