= Nóra Berend =

Hungarian historian

Nora Berend is a Fellow of St Catharine's College, Cambridge and Professor of European History at the Faculty of History.

Her book At the Gate of Christendom was awarded the Gladstone Prize.

Her father is the historian Ivan T. Berend.

== Selected publications ==
- Berend, Nora (2025). El Cid: The Life and Afterlife of a Medieval Mercenary. Pegasus Books. ISBN 978-1639366460.
- Berend, Nora (2024). Stephen I, the First Christian King of Hungary: From Medieval Myth to Modern Legend. Oxford Studies in Medieval European History. Oxford University Press. ISBN 978-0198889342.
- Berend, Nora; Urbańczyk, Przemysław; Wiszewski, Przemysław (2013). Central Europe in the High Middle Ages: Bohemia, Hungary and Poland c.900- c.1300. Cambridge Medieval Textbooks. Cambridge University Press. ISBN 978-0521786959.
- Berend, Nora, ed. (2012), The Expansion of Central Europe in the Middle Ages. London: Routledge. ISBN 9781351890083, 1351890085
- Berend, Nora (2007). Christianization and the Rise of Christian Monarchy: Scandinavia, Central Europe and Rus' c. 900-1200. MyiLibrary. Cambridge University Press. ISBN 978-0521876162.
- Abulafia, David; Berend, Nora (2002). Medieval Frontiers: Concepts and Practices. Ashgate Publishing. ISBN 9780754605225.
- Berend, Nora (2001). At the Gate of Christendom: Jews, Muslims, and "Pagans" in Medieval Hungary, c. 1000-c. 1300. Cambridge Studies in Medieval Life and Thought. Cambridge University Press. ISBN 9780521651851.
