= Administrative divisions of the Kingdom of Hungary (1941–1945) =

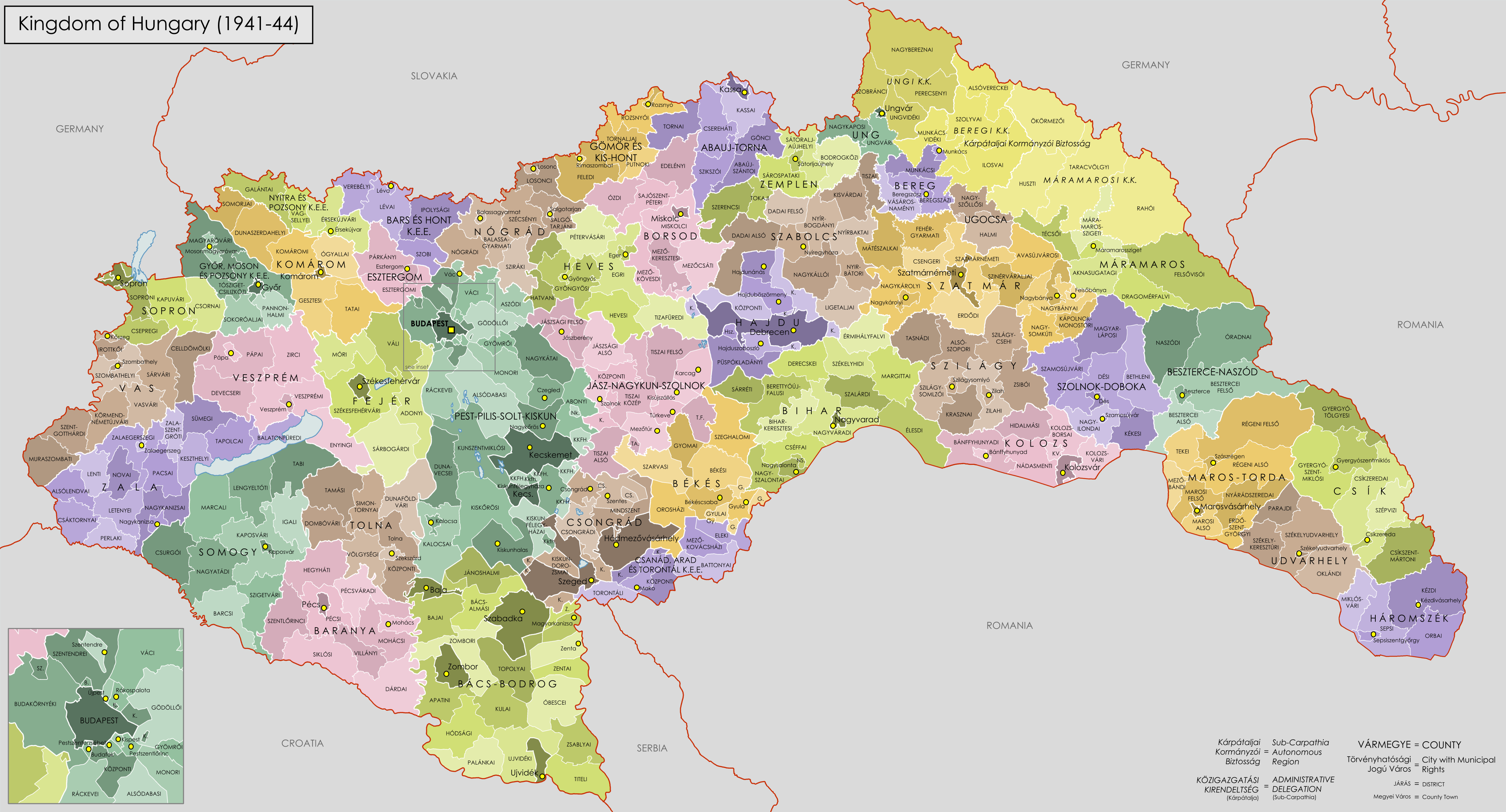
Map of the counties and districts (1941–44)

This article discusses the administrative divisions of the Kingdom of Hungary between 1941 and 1945. As a result of the First (1938) and Second Vienna Award (1940), territories that had been ceded by the Kingdom of Hungary at the 1920 Treaty of Trianon were partly regained from Czechoslovakia and Romania respectively. This required modification of the administrative divisions.

Hungary excluding Sub-Carpathia had three levels of administrative sub-division. Level One were: County (Vármegye, vm) and City with Municipal Status (Törvényhatósági Jogú Város, tjv). Counties were divided into Districts (Járás, j) and Urban Districts Megyei Város, mv) which constituted the second level. A third level were Sub-Districts, which were temporary entities typically created to give a position to a politician when no district leader posts were available.

The City of Budapest had the unique status of Royal Seat and Capital (székesfőváros, szfv.) and was legally distinct from the other Counties and Cities.

The Governorate of Subcarpathia (Kárpátalja) was a special case. It was given the status of Regent's Commissariat (Kormányzói Biztosság) with the intention that it would be governed by the Ruthenian minority population. It was divided into Administrative Delegations (Közigazgatási Kirendeltség), which were analogous to Counties. In practice, due to wartime restrictions, Sub-Carpathia was administered by officials appointed by the central government.

After the Treaty of Trianon and loss of territory, seven merged counties had been created to administer the areas where parts of counties were lost. With the First and Second Vienna Awards, several of these were de-merged and new ones created as additional territories were added, ending up with four merged counties. Continuing with the practice adopted after the Treaty of Trianon, Merged Counties were designed közigazgatásilag egyelőre egyesített (kee) which indicated that the merger was considered temporary and that the possibility of the restoration of the pre-Trianon border was possible.

== List ==
Listed below are the administrative sub-divisions excluding the temporary sub-districts. Capitals of Counties and Districts are shown in parentheses.

- Abaúj-Torna vm. (Kassa)
  - Abaújszántói j. (Abaújszántó)
  - Csereháti j. (Szepsi)
  - Gönci j. (Gönc)
  - Kassai j. (Kassa)
  - Szikszói j. (Szikszó)
  - Tornai j. (Torna)
- Kassa tjv.
- Bács-Bodrog vm. (Zombor)
  - Apatini j. (Apatin)
  - Bácsalmási j. (Bácsalmás)
  - Bajai j. (Baja)
  - Hódsági j. (Hódság)
  - Jánoshalmi j. (Jánoshalma)
  - Kulai j. (Kula)
  - Óbecsei j. (Óbecse)
  - Palánkai j. (Palánka)
  - Titeli j. (Titel)
  - Topolyai j. (Topolya)
  - Újvidéki j. (Újvidék)
  - Zentai j. (Zenta)
  - Zombori j. (Zombor)
  - Zsablyai j. (Zsablya)
  - Magyarkanizsa mv.
  - Zenta mv.
- Baja tjv.
- Szabadka tjv.
- Újvidék tjv.
- Zombor tjv.
- Baranya vm. (Pécs)
  - Dárdai j. (Dárda)
  - Hegyháti j. (Sásd)
  - Mohácsi j. (Mohács)
  - Pécsi j. (Pécs)
  - Pécsváradi j. (Pécsvárad)
  - Siklósi j. (Siklós)
  - Szentlőrinci j. (Szentlőrinc)
  - Villányi j. (Villány)
  - Mohács mv.
- Pécs tjv.
- Bars és Hont k.e.e. vm. (Léva)
  - Ipolysági j. (Ipolyság)
  - Lévai j. (Léva)
  - Szobi j. (Szob)
  - Verebélyi j. (Verebély)
  - Léva mv.
- Békés vm. (Gyula)
  - Békési j. (Békés)
  - Gyomai j. (Gyoma)
  - Gyulai j. (Gyula)
  - Orosházi j. (Orosháza)
  - Szarvasi j. (Szarvas)
  - Szeghalmi j. (Szeghalom)
  - Békéscsaba mv.
  - Gyula mv.
- Bereg vm. (Beregszász)
  - Beregszászi j. (Beregszász)
  - Munkácsi j. (Munkács)
  - Vásárosnaményi j. (Vásárosnamény)
  - Beregszász mv.
  - Munkács mv.
- Beszterce-Naszód vm. (Beszterce)
  - Besztercei alsó j. (Beszterce)
  - Besztercei felső j. (Beszterce)
  - Naszódi j. (Naszód)
  - Óradnai j. (Óradna)
  - Beszterce mv.
- Bihar vm. (Nagyvárad)
  - Berettyóújfalusi j. (Berettyóújfalu)
  - Biharkeresztesi j. (Biharkeresztes)
  - Cséffai j. (Cséffa)
  - Derecskei j. (Derecske)
  - Élesdi j. (Élesd)
  - Érmihályfalvi j. (Érmihályfalva)
  - Margittai j. (Margitta)
  - Nagyszalontai j. (Nagyszalonta)
  - Nagyváradi j. (Nagyvárad)
  - Sárréti j. (Biharnagybajom)
  - Szalárdi j. (Szalárd)
  - Székelyhidi j. (Székelyhid)
  - Nagyszalonta mv.
- Nagyvárad tjv.
- Borsod vm. (Miskolc)
  - Edelényi j. (Edelény)
  - Mezőcsáti j. (Mezőcsát)
  - Mezőkeresztesi j. (Mezőkeresztes)
  - Mezőkövesdi j. (Mezőkövesd)
  - Miskolci j. (Miskolc)
  - Ózdi j. (Ózd)
  - Sajószentpéteri j. (Sajószentpéter)
- Miskolc tjv.
- Csanád, Arad és Torontál k.e.e. vm. (Makó)
  - Battonyai j. (Battonya)
  - Eleki j. (Elek)
  - Központi j. (Makó)
  - Mezőkovácsházi j. (Mezőkovácsháza)
  - Torontáli j. (Kiszombor)
  - Makó mv.
- Csík vm. (Csíkszereda)
  - Csíkszentmártoni j. (Csíkszentmárton)
  - Csíkszeredai j. (Csíkszereda)
  - Gyergyószentmiklósi j. (Gyergyószentmiklós)
  - Gyergyótölgyesi j. (Gyergyótölgyes)
  - Szépvizi j. (Szépviz)
  - Csíkszereda mv.
  - Gyergyószentmiklós mv.
- Csongrád vm. (Szentes)
  - Csongrádi j. (Csongrád)
  - Kiskundorozsmai j. (Kiskundorozsma)
  - Mindszenti j. (Mindszent)
  - Csongrád mv.
  - Szentes mv.
- Hódmezővásárhely tjv.
- Szeged tjv.
- Esztergom vm. (Esztergom)
  - Esztergomi j. (Esztergom)
  - Párkányi j. (Párkány)
  - Esztergom mv.
- Fejér vm. (Székesfehérvár)
  - Adonyi j. (Adony)
  - Móri j. (Mór)
  - Sárbogárdi j. (Sárbogárd)
  - Székesfehérvári j. (Székesfehérvár)
  - Váli j. (Vál)
- Székesfehérvár tjv.
- Gömör és Kishont vm. (Rimaszombat)
  - Feledi j. (Feled)
  - Putnoki j. (Putnok)
  - Rozsnyói j. (Rozsnyó)
  - Tornaljai j. (Tornalja)
  - Rimaszombat mv.
  - Rozsnyó mv.
- Győr, Moson és Pozsony k.e.e. vm. (Győr)"
  - Magyaróvári j. (Mosonmagyaróvár)
  - Pannonhalmi j. (Győrszentmárton)
  - Sokoróaljai j. (Tét)
  - Tószigetcsilizközi j. (Győr)
  - Mosonmagyaróvár mv.
- Győr tjv.
- Hajdú vm. (Debrecen)
  - Központi j. (Debrecen)
  - Püspökladányi j. (Püspökladány)
  - Hajdúböszörmény mv.
  - Hajdúnánás mv.
  - Hajdúszoboszló mv.
- Debrecen tjv.
- Háromszék vm. (Sepsiszentgyörgy)
  - Kézdi j. (Kézdivásárhely)
  - Miklósvári j. (Barót)
  - Orbai j. (Kovászna)
  - Sepsi j. (Sepsiszentgyörgy)
  - Kézdivásárhely mv.
  - Sepsiszentgyörgy mv.
- Heves vm. (Eger)
  - Egri j. (Eger)
  - Gyöngyösi j. (Gyöngyös)
  - Hatvani j. (Hatvan)
  - Hevesi j. (Heves)
  - Pétervásári j. (Pétervására)
  - Tiszafüredi j. (Tiszafüred)
  - Eger mv.
  - Gyöngyös mv.
- Jász-Nagykun-Szolnok vm. (Szolnok)
  - Jászsági alsó j. (Jászapáti)
  - Jászsági felső j. (Jászberény)
  - Központi j. (Szolnok)
  - Tiszai alsó j. (Tiszaföldvár)
  - Tiszai felső j. (Kunhegyes)
  - Tiszai közép j. (Törökszentmiklós)
  - Jászberény mv.
  - Karcag mv.
  - Kisújszállás mv.
  - Mezőtúr mv.
  - Szolnok mv.
  - Túrkeve mv.
- Kolozs vm. (Kolozsvár)
  - Bánffyhunyadi j. (Bánffyhunyad)
  - Hidalmási j. (Hidalmás)
  - Kolozsborsai j. (Kolozsborsa)
  - Kolozsvári j. (Kolozsvár)
  - Nádasmenti j. (Kolozsvár)
  - Bánffyhunyad mv.
- Kolozsvár tjv.
- Komárom vm. (Komárom)
  - Dunaszerdahelyi j. (Dunaszerdahely)
  - Gesztesi j. (Komárom)
  - Komáromi j. (Komárom)
  - Ógyallai j. (Ógyalla)
  - Somorjai j. (Somorja)
  - Tatai j. (Tata)
- Komárom tjv.
- Máramaros vm. (Máramarossziget)
  - Aknasugatagi j. (Aknasugatag)
  - Dragomérfalvi j. (Dragomérfalva)
  - Felsővisói j. (Felsővisó)
  - Máramarosszigeti j. (Máramarossziget)
  - Técsői j. (Técső)
  - Máramarossziget mv.
- Maros-Torda vm. (Marosvásárhely)
  - Erdőszentgyörgyi j. (Erdőszentgyörgy)
  - Marosi alsó j. (Marosvásárhely)
  - Marosi felső j. (Marosvásárhely)
  - Mezőbándi j. (Mezőbánd)
  - Nyárádszeredai j. (Nyárádszereda)
  - Régeni alsó j. (Szászrégen)
  - Régeni felső j. (Szászrégen)
  - Tekei j. (Teke)
  - Szászrégen mv.
- Marosvásárhely tjv.
- Nógrád vm. (Balassagyarmat)
  - Balassagyarmati j. (Balassagyarmat)
  - Losonci j. (Losonc)
  - Nógrádi j. (Rétság)
  - Salgótarjáni j. (Salgótarján)
  - Szécsényi j. (Szécsény)
  - Sziráki j. (Szirák)
  - Balassagyarmat mv.
  - Losonc mv.
  - Salgótarján mv.
- Nyitra és Pozsony k.e.e. vm. (Érsekújvár)
  - Érsekújvári j. (Érsekújvár)
  - Galántai j. (Galánta)
  - Vágsellyei j. (Tornóc)
  - Érsekújvár mv.
- Pest-Pilis-Solt-Kiskun vm. (Budapest)
  - Abonyi j. (Abony)
  - Alsódabasi j. (Alsódabas)
  - Aszódi j. (Aszód)
  - Budakörnyéki j. (Budapest)
  - Dunavecsei j. (Dunavecse)
  - Gödöllői j. (Gödöllő)
  - Gyömrői j. (Gyömrő)
  - Kalocsai j. (Kalocsa)
  - Kiskőrösi j. (Kiskőrös)
  - Kiskunfélegyházi j. (Kiskunfélegyháza)
  - Központi j. (Budapest)
  - Kunszentmiklósi j. (Kunszentmiklós)
  - Monori j. (Monor)
  - Nagykátai j. (Nagykáta)
  - Ráckevei j. (Ráckeve)
  - Szentendrei j. (Szentendre)
  - Váci j. (Vác)
  - Budafok mv.
  - Cegléd mv.
  - Kalocsa mv.
  - Kiskunfélegyháza mv.
  - Kiskunhalas mv.
  - Kispest mv.
  - Nagykörös mv.
  - Pestszenterzsébet mv.
  - Pestszentlőrinc mv.
  - Rákospalota mv.
  - Szentendre mv.
  - Újpest mv.
  - Vác mv.
- Budapest szfv.
- Kecskemét tjv.
- Somogy vm. (Kaposvár)
  - Barcsi j. (Barcs)
  - Csurgói j. (Csurgó)
  - Igali j. (Igal)
  - Kaposvári j. (Kaposvár)
  - Lengyeltóti j. (Lengyeltóti)
  - Marcali j. (Marcali)
  - Nagyatádi j. (Nagyatád)
  - Szigetvári j. (Szigetvár)
  - Tabi j. (Tab)
  - Kaposvár mv.
- Sopron vm. (Sopron)
  - Csepregi j. (Csepreg)
  - Csornai j. (Csorna)
  - Kapuvári j. (Kapuvár)
  - Soproni j. (Sopron)
- Sopron tjv.
- Szabolcs vm. (Nyiregyháza)
  - Dadai alsó j. (Tiszalök)
  - Dadai felső j. (Gáva)
  - Kisvárdai j. (Kisvárda)
  - Ligetaljai j. (Nyíradony)
  - Nagykállói j. (Nagykálló)
  - Nyírbaktai j. (Baktalórántháza)
  - Nyírbátori j. (Nyírbátor)
  - Nyírbogdányi j. (Kemecse)
  - Tiszai j. (Mándok)
  - Nyíregyháza mv.
- Szatmár vm. (Nagykároly)
  - Avasújvárosi j. (Avasújváros)
  - Csengeri j. (Csenger)
  - Erdődi j. (Erdőd)
  - Fehérgyarmati j. (Fehérgyarmat)
  - Kápolnokmonostori j. (Kápolnokmonostor)
  - Mátészalkai j. (Mátészalka)
  - Nagybányai j. (Nagybánya)
  - Nagykárolyi j. (Nagykároly)
  - Nagysomkúti j. (Nagysomkút)
  - Szatmárnémeti j. (Szatmárnémeti)
  - Szinérváraljai j. (Szinérváralja)
  - Felsőbánya mv.
  - Nagybánya mv.
  - Nagykároly mv.
- Szatmárnémeti tjv.
- Szilágy vm. (Zilah)
  - Alsószopori j. (Alsószopor)
  - Krasznai j. (Kraszna)
  - Szilágycsehi j. (Szilágycseh)
  - Szilágysomlyói j. (Szilágysomlyó)
  - Tasnádi j. (Tasnád)
  - Zilahi j. (Zilah)
  - Zsibói j. (Zsibó)
  - Szilágysomlyó mv.
  - Zilah mv.
- Szolnok-Doboka vm. (Dés)
  - Bethleni j. (Bethlen)
  - Dési j. (Dés)
  - Kékesi j. (Kékes)
  - Magyarláposi j. (Magyarlápos)
  - Nagyilondai j. (Nagyilonda)
  - Szamosújvári j. (Szamosújvár)
  - Dés mv.
  - Szamosújvár mv.
- Tolna vm. (Szekszárd)
  - Dombóvári j. (Dombóvár)
  - Dunaföldvári j. (Paks)
  - Központi j. (Szekszárd)
  - Simontornyai j. (Gyönk)
  - Tamási j. (Tamási)
  - Völgységi j. (Bonyhád)
  - Szekszárd mv.
- Udvarhely vm. (Székelyudvarhely)
  - Oklándi j. (Oklánd)
  - Parajdi j. (Parajd)
  - Székelykeresztúri j. (Székelykeresztúr)
  - Székelyudvarhelyi j. (Székelyudvarhely)
  - Székelyudvarhely mv.
- Ugocsa vm. (Nagyszőllős)
  - Halmi j. (Halmi)
  - Nagyszőllősi j. (Nagyszőllős)
- Ung vm. (Ungvár)
  - Nagykaposi j. (Nagykapos)
  - Ungvári j. (Ungvár)
- Ungvár tjv.
- Vas vm. (Szombathely)
  - Celldömölki j. (Celldömölk)
  - Irottkői j. (Kőszeg)
  - Körmend-németújvári j. (Körmend)
  - Muraszombati j. (Muraszombat)
  - Sárvári j. (Sárvár)
  - Szentgotthárdi j. (Szentgotthárd)
  - Szombathelyi j. (Szombathely)
  - Vasvári j. (Vasvár)
  - Kőszeg mv.
  - Szombathely mv.
- Veszprém vm. (Veszprém)
  - Devecseri j. (Devecser)
  - Enyingi j. (Enying)
  - Pápai j. (Pápa)
  - Veszprémi j. (Veszprém)
  - Zirci j. (Zirc)
  - Pápa mv.
  - Veszprém mv.
- Zala vm. (Zalaegerszeg)
  - Alsólendvai j. (Alsólendva)
  - Balatonfüredi j. (Balatonfüred)
  - Csáktornyai j. (Csáktornya)
  - Keszthelyi j. (Keszthely)
  - Lenti j. (Lenti)
  - Letenyei j. (Letenye)
  - Nagykanizsai j. (Nagykanizsa)
  - Novai j. (Nova)
  - Pacsai j. (Pacsa)
  - Perlaki j. (Perlak)
  - Sümegi j. (Sümeg)
  - Tapolcai j. (Tapolca)
  - Zalaegerszegi j. (Zalaegerszeg)
  - Zalaszentgróti j. (Zalaszentgrót)
  - Nagykanizsa mv.
  - Zalaegerszeg mv.
- Zemplén vm. (Sátoraljaújhely)
  - Bodrogközi j. (Királyhelmec)
  - Sárospataki j. (Sárospatak)
  - Sátoraljaújhelyi j. (Sátoraljaújhely)
  - Szerencsi j. (Szerencs)
  - Tokaji j. (Tokaj)
  - Sátoraljaújhely mv.

Kárpátalja

- Beregi kk. (Munkács)
  - Alsóvereckei j. (Alsóverecke)
  - Ilosvai j. (Ilosva)
  - Munkácsvidéki j. (Munkács)
  - Szolyvai j. (Szolyva)
- Máramarosi kk. (Huszt)
  - Huszti j. (Huszt)
  - Ökörmezői j. (Ökörmező)
  - Rahói j. (Rahó)
  - Taracvölgyi j. (Técső)
- Ungi kk. (Ungvár)
  - Nagybereznai j. (Nagyberezna)
  - Perecsenyi j. (Perecseny)
  - Szobránci j. (Szobránc)
  - Ungvidéki j. (Ungvár)

== See also ==
- Regions of Hungary
- Counties of Hungary
- Districts of Hungary (from 2013)
  - Subregions of Hungary (until 2013)
- Administrative divisions of the Kingdom of Hungary (until 1920)
  - Counties of the Kingdom of Hungary
- Administrative divisions of the Kingdom of Hungary (1941–45)
- List of cities and towns of Hungary
- NUTS:HU
