= Demographics of the Kingdom of Hungary by county =

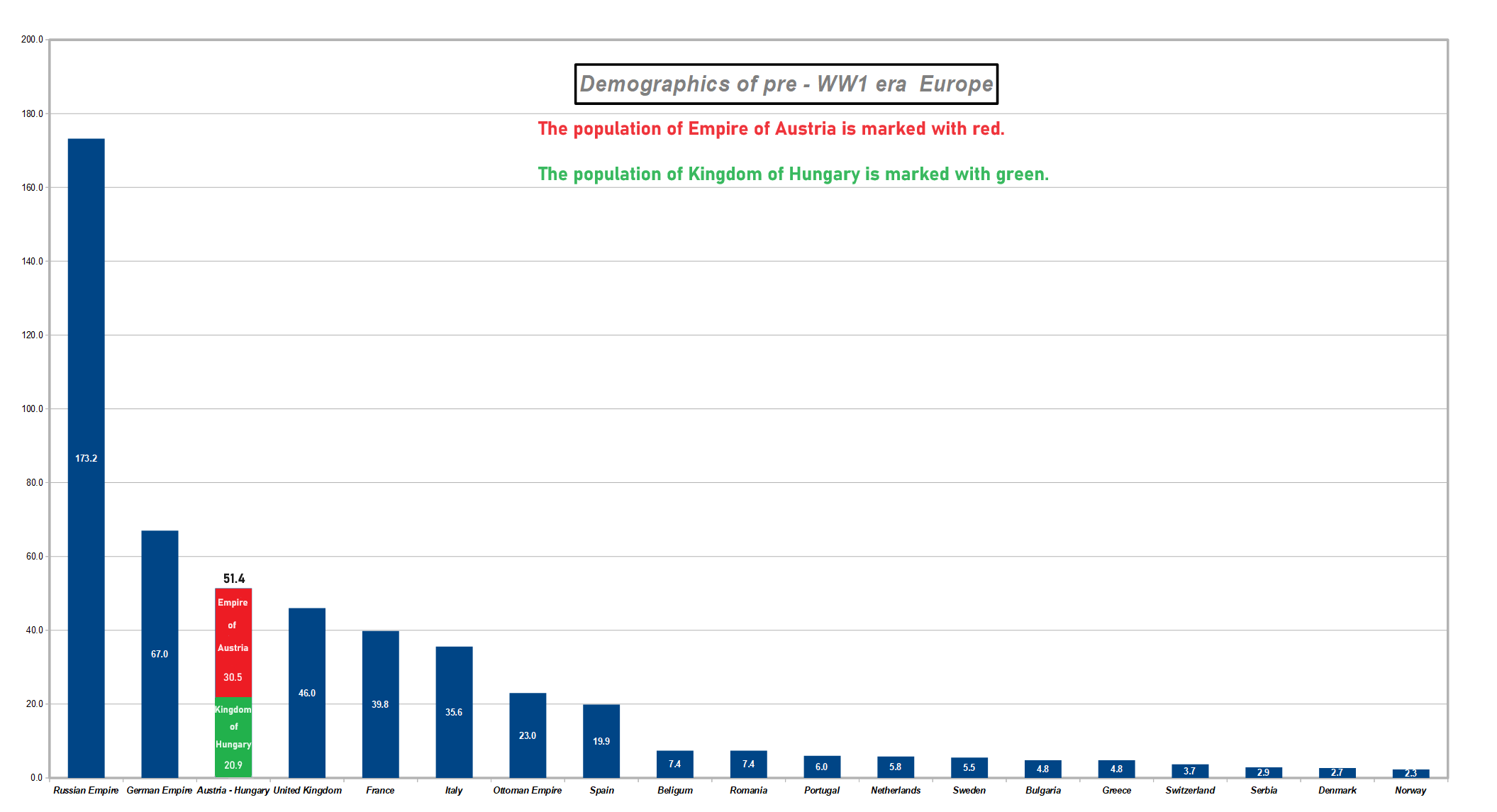
Comparative demographics of Empire of Austria (red) and Kingdom of Hungary (green) in Europe before WW1

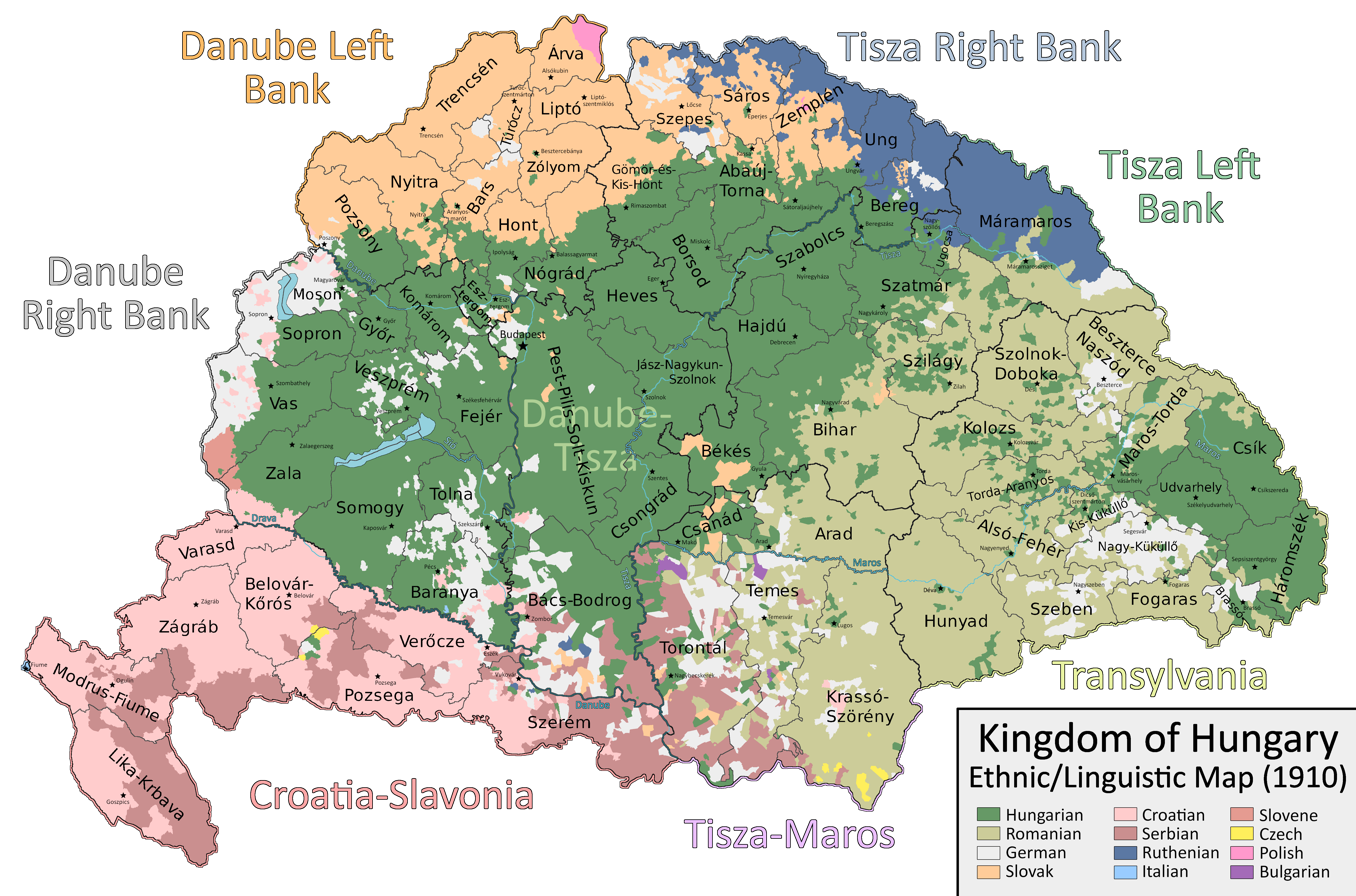
Ethnic and political situation in the Kingdom of Hungary according to the 1910 census

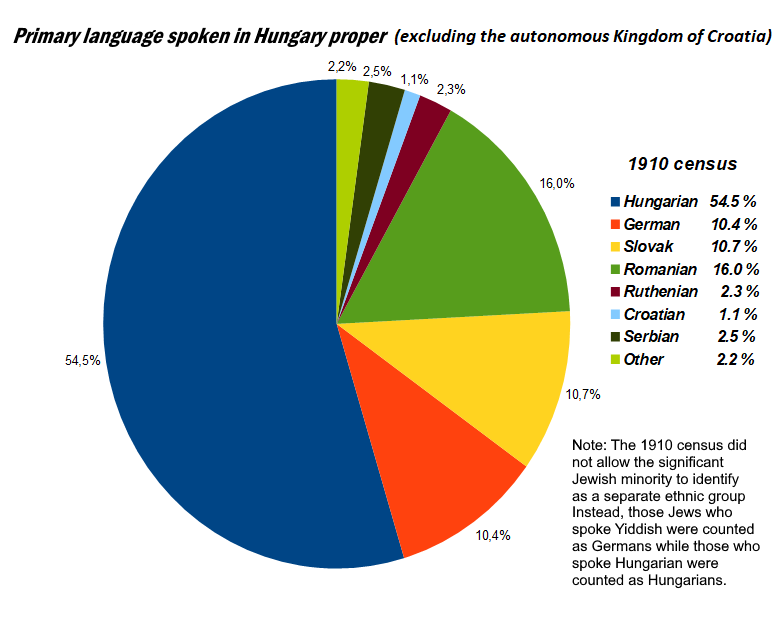
1910 census in Kingdom of Hungary

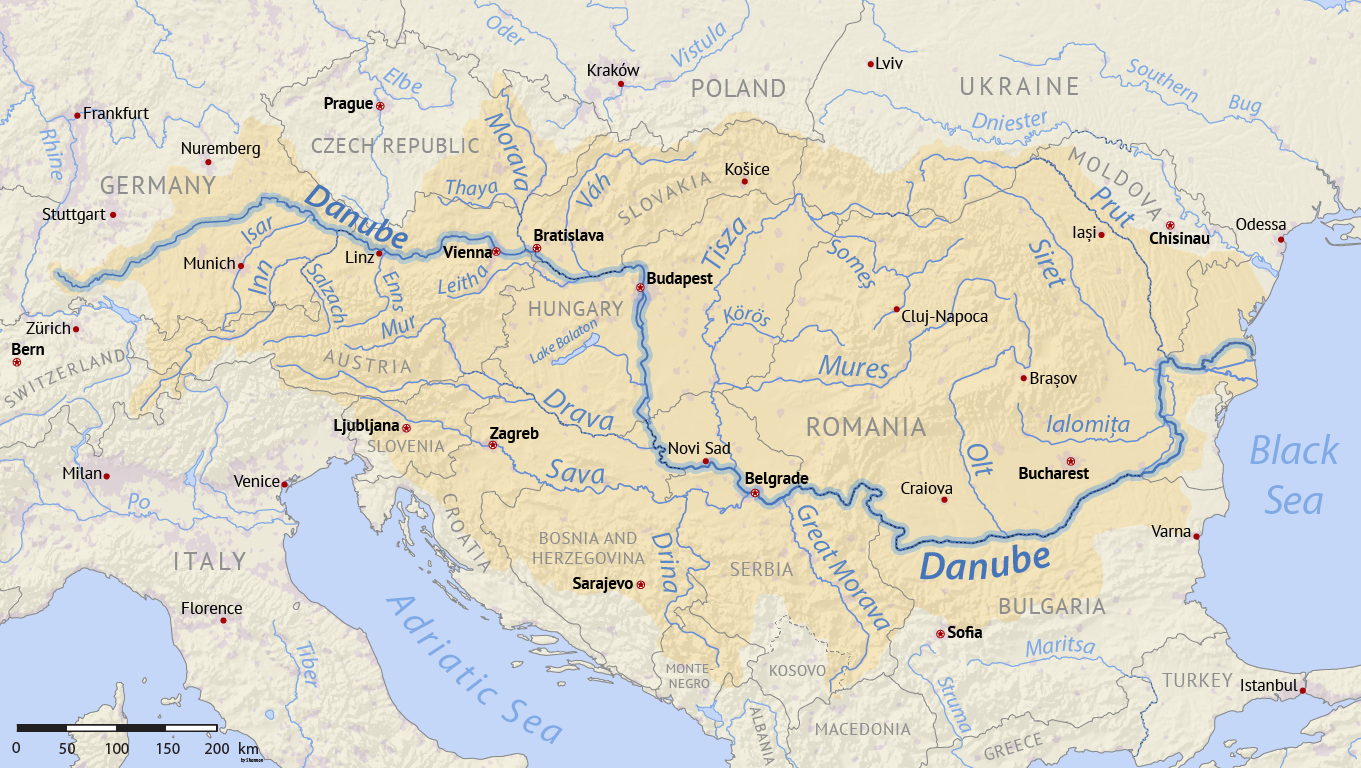
The Danube River basin, with its tributaries the Tisza and Mures (Maros) shown

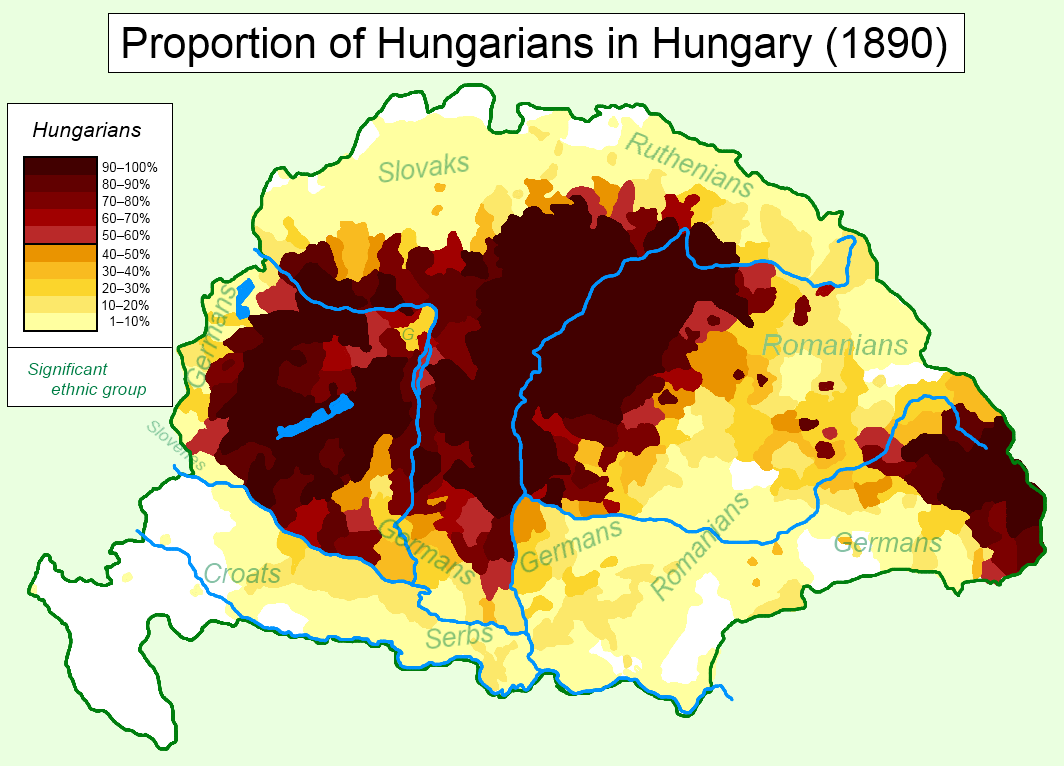
Proportion of Hungarians in Hungary, 1890 census based on the most commonly spoken languages

The following table shows the linguistic composition of each Hungarian county according to the Hungarian Census of 1910.

Danube Right Bank	Hungarian	German	Slovak	Romanian	Ruthenian	Croatian	Serbian	Other	Total
Baranya County	199,659 (56.6%)	112,297 (31.9%)	392 (0.1%)	54 (0.0%)	5 (0.0%)	10,159 (2.9%)	13,048 (3.7%)	16,864 (4.8%)	352,478 (11.4%)
Fejér County	218,822 (87.3%)	24,265 (9.7%)	4,359 (1.7%)	37 (0.0%)	5 (0.0%)	333 (0.1%)	814 (0.3%)	2,035 (0.8%)	250,670 (8.1%)
Győr County	132,991 (97.6%)	2,023 (1.5%)	609 (0.4%)	17 (0.0%)	2 (0.0%)	109 (0.1%)	17 (0.0%)	527 (0.4%)	136,295 (4.4%)
Komárom County	178,473 (88.4%)	12,517 (6.2%)	8,105 (4.0%)	486 (0.2%)	145 (0.1%)	237 (0.1%)	32 (0.0%)	1,855 (0.9%)	201,850 (6.5%)
Moson County	33,006 (34.9%)	51,997 (55.0%)	735 (0.8%)	5 (0.0%)	7 (0.0%)	8,123 (8.6%)	2 (0.0%)	604 (0.6%)	94,479 (3.1%)
Somogy County	333,597 (91.2%)	18,718 (5.1%)	364 (0.1%)	63 (0.0%)	4 (0.0%)	9,934 (2.7%)	44 (0.0%)	3,237 (0.9%)	365,961 (11.9%)
Sopron County	141,011 (49.7%)	109,160 (38.5%)	397 (0.1%)	33 (0.0%)	4 (0.0%)	31,004 (10.9%)	15 (0.0%)	1,886 (0.7%)	283,510 (9.2%)
Tolna County	189,521 (70.9%)	74,376 (27.8%)	789 (0.3%)	39 (0.0%)	4 (0.0%)	343 (0.1%)	1,102 (0.4%)	1,085 (0.4%)	267,259 (8.7%)
Vas County	247,985 (56.9%)	117,169 (26.9%)	288 (0.1%)	14 (0.0%)	48 (0.0%)	16,230 (3.7%)	23 (0.0%)	54,036 (12.4%)	435,793 (14.1%)
Veszprém County	199,063 (86.6%)	29,283 (12.7%)	917 (0.4%)	41 (0.0%)	5 (0.0%)	55 (0.0%)	17 (0.0%)	395 (0.2%)	229,776 (7.4%)
Zala County	347,167 (74.4%)	3,889 (0.8%)	233 (0.0%)	44 (0.0%)	3 (0.0%)	91,909 (19.7%)	56 (0.0%)	23,032 (4.9%)	466,333 (15.1%)
Total	2,221,295 (72.0%)	555,694 (18.0%)	17,188 (0.6%)	833 (0.0%)	232 (0.0%)	168,436 (5.5%)	15,170 (0.5%)	105,556 (3.4%)	3,084,404 (14.8%)
Danube Left Bank	Hungarian	German	Slovak	Romanian	Ruthenian	Croatian	Serbian	Other	Total
Árva County	2,000 (2.5%)	1,518 (1.9%)	59,096 (75.0%)	8 (0.0%)	1 (0.0%)	1 (0.0%)	1 (0.0%)	16,120 (20.5%)	78,745 (3.6%)
Bars County	62,022 (34.7%)	17,366 (9.7%)	97,824 (54.8%)	11 (0.0%)	92 (0.1%)	12 (0.0%)	8 (0.0%)	1,165 (0.7%)	178,500 (8.2%)
Esztergom County	73,418 (80.8%)	9,455 (10.4%)	7,520 (8.3%)	14 (0.0%)	5 (0.0%)	88 (0.1%)	12 (0.0%)	305 (0.3%)	90,817 (4.2%)
Hont County	73,215 (55.3%)	6,417 (4.8%)	51,522 (38.9%)	71 (0.1%)	7 (0.0%)	19 (0.0%)	18 (0.0%)	1,172 (0.9%)	132,441 (6.1%)
Liptó County	4,365 (5.0%)	2,591 (3.0%)	78,098 (89.9%)	222 (0.3%)	25 (0.0%)	11 (0.0%)	1 (0.0%)	1,593 (1.8%)	86,906 (4.0%)
Nógrád County	197,670 (75.6%)	3,143 (1.2%)	58,337 (22.3%)	33 (0.0%)	4 (0.0%)	52 (0.0%)	36 (0.0%)	2,242 (0.9%)	261,517 (12.0%)
Nyitra County	100,324 (21.9%)	27,937 (6.1%)	324,664 (71.0%)	39 (0.0%)	13 (0.0%)	81 (0.0%)	26 (0.0%)	4,371 (1.0%)	457,455 (21.0%)
Pozsony County	163,367 (41.9%)	53,822 (13.8%)	166,017 (42.6%)	81 (0.0%)	42 (0.0%)	1,934 (0.5%)	31 (0.0%)	4,456 (1.1%)	389,750 (17.9%)
Trencsén County	13,204 (4.3%)	9,029 (2.9%)	284,770 (91.7%)	172 (0.1%)	24 (0.0%)	78 (0.0%)	51 (0.0%)	3,109 (1.0%)	310,437 (14.3%)
Turóc County	5,560 (10.0%)	10,993 (19.7%)	38,432 (69.0%)	27 (0.0%)	44 (0.1%)	4 (0.0%)	3 (0.0%)	640 (1.1%)	55,703 (2.6%)
Zólyom County	16,509 (12.4%)	2,124 (1.6%)	113,294 (84.8%)	26 (0.0%)	136 (0.1%)	14 (0.0%)	13 (0.0%)	1,537 (1.1%)	133,653 (6.1%)
Total	711,654 (32.7%)	144,395 (6.6%)	1,279,574 (58.8%)	704 (0.0%)	393 (0.0%)	2,294 (0.1%)	200 (0.0%)	36,710 (1.7%)	2,175,924 (10.4%)
Danube-Tisza	Hungarian	German	Slovak	Romanian	Ruthenian	Croatian	Serbian	Other	Total
Bács-Bodrog County	363,518 (44.7%)	190,697 (23.5%)	30,137 (3.7%)	386 (0.0%)	10,760 (1.3%)	1,279 (0.2%)	145,063 (17.9%)	70,545 (8.7%)	812,385 (21.6%)
Csongrád County	319,274 (98.1%)	2,862 (0.9%)	646 (0.2%)	773 (0.2%)	11 (0.0%)	94 (0.0%)	1,235 (0.4%)	673 (0.2%)	325,568 (8.6%)
Heves County	277,378 (99.2%)	800 (0.3%)	972 (0.3%)	91 (0.0%)	30 (0.0%)	42 (0.0%)	23 (0.0%)	364 (0.1%)	279,700 (7.4%)
Jász-Nagykun-Szolnok County	372,423 (99.6%)	639 (0.2%)	450 (0.1%)	206 (0.1%)	14 (0.0%)	32 (0.0%)	43 (0.0%)	157 (0.0%)	373,964 (9.9%)
Pest-Pilis-Solt-Kiskun County	1,728,473 (87.4%)	162,824 (8.2%)	47,149 (2.4%)	3,357 (0.2%)	306 (0.0%)	3,419 (0.2%)	7,934 (0.4%)	24,579 (1.2%)	1,978,041 (52.5%)
Total	3,061,066 (81.2%)	357,822 (9.5%)	79,354 (2.1%)	4,813 (0.1%)	11,121 (0.3%)	4,866 (0.1%)	154,298 (4.1%)	96,318 (2.6%)	3,769,658 (18.0%)
Tisza Right Bank	Hungarian	German	Slovak	Romanian	Ruthenian	Croatian	Serbian	Other	Total
Abaúj-Torna County	156,668 (77.4%)	6,520 (3.2%)	36,067 (17.8%)	127 (0.1%)	378 (0.2%)	63 (0.0%)	21 (0.0%)	2,444 (1.2%)	202,288 (11.4%)
Bereg County	113,090 (47.8%)	20,722 (8.8%)	1,123 (0.5%)	215 (0.1%)	100,918 (42.7%)	54 (0.0%)	12 (0.0%)	477 (0.2%)	236,611 (13.4%)
Borsod County	281,874 (97.2%)	2,379 (0.8%)	4,115 (1.4%)	293 (0.1%)	174 (0.1%)	70 (0.0%)	44 (0.0%)	965 (0.3%)	289,914 (16.4%)
Gömör és Kis-Hont County	109,994 (58.5%)	2,930 (1.6%)	72,232 (38.4%)	80 (0.0%)	21 (0.0%)	88 (0.0%)	8 (0.0%)	2,745 (1.5%)	188,098 (10.6%)
Sáros County	18,088 (10.4%)	9,447 (5.4%)	101,855 (58.3%)	321 (0.2%)	38,500 (22.0%)	15 (0.0%)	2 (0.0%)	6,392 (3.7%)	174,620 (9.9%)
Szepes County	18,658 (10.8%)	38,434 (22.2%)	97,077 (56.2%)	532 (0.3%)	12,327 (7.1%)	65 (0.0%)	145 (0.1%)	5,629 (3.3%)	172,867 (9.8%)
Ung County	53,824 (33.2%)	8,383 (5.2%)	36,364 (22.4%)	133 (0.1%)	61,711 (38.1%)	82 (0.1%)	8 (0.0%)	1,584 (1.0%)	162,089 (9.2%)
Zemplén County	193,794 (56.5%)	9,749 (2.8%)	92,943 (27.1%)	209 (0.1%)	39,033 (11.4%)	49 (0.0%)	7 (0.0%)	7,410 (2.2%)	343,194 (19.4%)
Total	945,990 (53.5%)	98,564 (5.6%)	441,776 (25.0%)	1,910 (0.1%)	253,062 (14.3%)	486 (0.0%)	247 (0.0%)	27,646 (1.6%)	1,769,681 (8.5%)
Tisza Left Bank	Hungarian	German	Slovak	Romanian	Ruthenian	Croatian	Serbian	Other	Total
Békés County	219,261 (73.4%)	6,048 (2.0%)	66,770 (22.4%)	6,125 (2.1%)	4 (0.0%)	17 (0.0%)	76 (0.0%)	409 (0.1%)	298,710 (11.5%)
Bihar County	365,642 (56.6%)	3,599 (0.6%)	8,457 (1.3%)	265,098 (41.0%)	211 (0.0%)	156 (0.0%)	122 (0.0%)	3,016 (0.5%)	646,301 (24.9%)
Hajdú County	251,918 (99.2%)	1,044 (0.4%)	118 (0.0%)	376 (0.1%)	25 (0.0%)	23 (0.0%)	76 (0.0%)	283 (0.1%)	253,863 (9.8%)
Máramaros County	52,964 (14.8%)	59,552 (16.6%)	503 (0.1%)	84,510 (23.6%)	159,489 (44.6%)	41 (0.0%)	6 (0.0%)	640 (0.2%)	357,705 (13.8%)
Szabolcs County	316,765 (99.0%)	868 (0.3%)	1,117 (0.3%)	212 (0.1%)	194 (0.1%)	15 (0.0%)	7 (0.0%)	640 (0.2%)	319,818 (12.3%)
Szatmár County	268,385 (67.7%)	6,670 (1.7%)	425 (0.1%)	119,760 (30.2%)	114 (0.0%)	66 (0.0%)	27 (0.0%)	1,185 (0.3%)	396,632 (15.3%)
Szilágy County	87,312 (37.9%)	816 (0.4%)	3,727 (1.6%)	136,087 (59.1%)	52 (0.0%)	5 (0.0%)	6 (0.0%)	2,135 (0.9%)	230,140 (8.9%)
Ugocsa County	42,677 (46.5%)	4,632 (5.0%)	37 (0.0%)	9,750 (10.6%)	34,415 (37.5%)	4 (0.0%)	1 (0.0%)	239 (0.3%)	91,755 (3.5%)
Total	1,604,924 (61.8%)	83,229 (3.2%)	81,154 (3.1%)	621,918 (24.0%)	194,504 (7.5%)	327 (0.0%)	321 (0.0%)	8,547 (0.3%)	2,594,924 (12.4%)
Tisza-Maros	Hungarian	German	Slovak	Romanian	Ruthenian	Croatian	Serbian	Other	Total
Arad County	124,215 (30.0%)	38,695 (9.3%)	5,451 (1.3%)	239,755 (57.9%)	677 (0.2%)	70 (0.0%)	2,138 (0.5%)	3,387 (0.8%)	414,388 (19.3%)
Csanád County	108,621 (74.8%)	1,013 (0.7%)	17,133 (11.8%)	14,046 (9.7%)	119 (0.1%)	8 (0.0%)	3,967 (2.7%)	341 (0.2%)	145,248 (6.8%)
Krassó-Szörény County	33,787 (7.2%)	55,883 (12.0%)	2,908 (0.6%)	336,082 (72.1%)	2,351 (0.5%)	319 (0.1%)	14,674 (3.1%)	20,143 (4.3%)	466,147 (21.8%)
Temes County	79,960 (16.0%)	165,883 (33.1%)	3,080 (0.6%)	169,030 (33.7%)	30 (0.0%)	350 (0.1%)	69,905 (14.0%)	12,597 (2.5%)	500,835 (23.4%)
Torontál County	128,405 (20.9%)	165,779 (26.9%)	16,143 (2.6%)	86,937 (14.1%)	11 (0.0%)	4,203 (0.7%)	199,750 (32.5%)	13,923 (2.3%)	615,151 (28.7%)
Total	474,988 (22.2%)	427,253 (19.9%)	44,715 (2.1%)	845,850 (39.5%)	3,188 (0.1%)	4,950 (0.2%)	290,434 (13.6%)	50,391 (2.4%)	2,141,769 (10.3%)
Transylvania	Hungarian	German	Slovak	Romanian	Ruthenian	Croatian	Serbian	Other	Total
Alsó-Fehér County	39,107 (17.6%)	7,269 (3.3%)	184 (0.1%)	171,483 (77.4%)	8 (0.0%)	8 (0.0%)	18 (0.0%)	3,541 (1.6%)	221,618 (8.3%)
Beszterce-Naszód County	10,737 (8.4%)	25,609 (20.0%)	37 (0.0%)	87,564 (68.5%)	213 (0.2%)	11 (0.0%)	6 (0.0%)	3,666 (2.9%)	127,843 (4.8%)
Brassó County	35,372 (35.0%)	29,542 (29.2%)	184 (0.2%)	35,091 (34.7%)	18 (0.0%)	19 (0.0%)	22 (0.0%)	951 (0.9%)	101,199 (3.8%)
Csík County	125,888 (86.4%)	1,080 (0.7%)	85 (0.1%)	18,032 (12.4%)	188 (0.1%)	13 (0.0%)	3 (0.0%)	431 (0.3%)	145,720 (5.4%)
Fogaras County	6,466 (6.8%)	3,236 (3.4%)	55 (0.1%)	84,436 (88.7%)	20 (0.0%)	5 (0.0%)	3 (0.0%)	953 (1.0%)	95,174 (3.6%)
Háromszék County	123,518 (83.4%)	617 (0.4%)	202 (0.1%)	22,963 (15.5%)	144 (0.1%)	15 (0.0%)	14 (0.0%)	607 (0.4%)	148,080 (5.5%)
Hunyad County	52,720 (15.5%)	8,101 (2.4%)	1,024 (0.3%)	271,675 (79.9%)	606 (0.2%)	195 (0.1%)	140 (0.0%)	5,674 (1.7%)	340,135 (12.7%)
Kis-Küküllő County	34,902 (30.1%)	20,272 (17.5%)	31 (0.0%)	55,585 (47.9%)	1 (0.0%)	4 (0.0%)	2 (0.0%)	5,294 (4.6%)	116,091 (4.3%)
Kolozs County	111,439 (38.9%)	8,386 (2.9%)	169 (0.1%)	161,279 (56.3%)	13 (0.0%)	55 (0.0%)	44 (0.0%)	5,302 (1.8%)	286,687 (10.7%)
Maros-Torda County	134,166 (61.1%)	8,312 (3.8%)	79 (0.0%)	71,909 (32.7%)	174 (0.1%)	33 (0.0%)	25 (0.0%)	4,891 (2.2%)	219,589 (8.2%)
Nagy-Küküllő County	18,474 (12.4%)	62,224 (41.8%)	63 (0.0%)	60,381 (40.6%)	6 (0.0%)	57 (0.0%)	4 (0.0%)	7,617 (5.1%)	148,826 (5.6%)
Szeben County	10,159 (5.7%)	49,757 (28.1%)	154 (0.1%)	113,672 (64.3%)	205 (0.1%)	84 (0.0%)	95 (0.1%)	2,795 (1.6%)	176,921 (6.6%)
Szolnok-Doboka County	52,181 (20.7%)	6,902 (2.7%)	42 (0.0%)	189,443 (75.2%)	154 (0.1%)	9 (0.0%)	7 (0.0%)	3,198 (1.3%)	251,936 (9.4%)
Torda-Aranyos County	44,630 (25.6%)	576 (0.3%)	62 (0.0%)	125,668 (72.1%)	8 (0.0%)	10 (0.0%)	3 (0.0%)	3,418 (2.0%)	174,375 (6.5%)
Udvarhely County	118,458 (95.4%)	2,202 (1.8%)	33 (0.0%)	2,840 (2.3%)	1 (0.0%)	5 (0.0%)	35 (0.0%)	599 (0.5%)	124,173 (4.6%)
Total	918,217 (34.3%)	234,085 (8.7%)	2,404 (0.1%)	1,472,021 (55.0%)	1,759 (0.1%)	523 (0.0%)	421 (0.0%)	48,937 (1.8%)	2,678,367 (12.8%)
Fiume	Hungarian	German	Slovak	Romanian	Ruthenian	Croatian	Serbian	Other (mostly Italian)	Total
Fiume	6,493 (13.0%)	2,315 (4.6%)	192 (0.4%)	137 (0.3%)	11 (0.0%)	12,926 (26.0%)	425 (0.9%)	27,307 (54.8%)	49,806 (0.2%)
KINGDOM OF HUNGARY	9,944,627 (54.4%)	1,903,357 (10.4%)	1,946,357 (10.7%)	2,948,186 (16.1%)	464,270 (2.5%)	194,808 (1.1%)	461,516 (2.5%)	401,412 (2.2%)	18,264,533 (87.4%)
Croatia-Slavonia	Hungarian	German	Slovak	Romanian	Ruthenian	Croatian	Serbian	Other	Total
Belovár-Kőrös County	14,224 (4.3%)	4,235 (1.3%)	386 (0.1%)	1 (0.0%)	281 (0.1%)	253,687 (76.3%)	44,533 (13.4%)	15,245 (4.6%)	332,592 (12.7%)
Lika-Korbava County	22 (0.0%)	68 (0.0%)	3 (0.0%)	2 (0.0%)	2 (0.0%)	100,346 (49.0%)	104,036 (50.8%)	231 (0.1%)	204,710 (7.8%)
Modrus-Fiume County	899 (0.4%)	592 (0.3%)	64 (0.0%)	6 (0.0%)	4 (0.0%)	152,210 (65.7%)	74,894 (32.3%)	2,985 (1.3%)	231,654 (8.8%)
Pozsega County	16,462 (6.2%)	13,143 (5.0%)	3,352 (1.3%)	154 (0.1%)	2,888 (1.1%)	142,616 (53.8%)	66,783 (25.2%)	19,874 (7.5%)	265,272 (10.1%)
Szerém County	29,522 (7.1%)	68,086 (16.4%)	13,841 (3.3%)	587 (0.1%)	4,642 (1.1%)	106,198 (25.6%)	183,109 (44.2%)	8,249 (2.0%)	414,234 (15.8%)
Varasd County	1,095 (0.4%)	1,172 (0.4%)	41 (0.0%)	2 (0.0%)	0 (0.0%)	300,033 (97.7%)	2,384 (0.8%)	2,283 (0.7%)	307,010 (11.7%)
Verőcze County	37,656 (13.8%)	40,766 (15.0%)	3,691 (1.4%)	64 (0.0%)	439 (0.2%)	137,394 (50.4%)	46,658 (17.1%)	5,762 (2.1%)	272,430 (10.4%)
Zágráb County	6,068 (1.0%)	6,016 (1.0%)	235 (0.0%)	30 (0.0%)	61 (0.0%)	445,870 (75.1%)	122,558 (20.6%)	13,214 (2.2%)	594,052 (22.7%)
Total	105,948 (4.0%)	134,078 (5.1%)	21,613 (0.8%)	846 (0.0%)	8,317 (0.3%)	1,638,354 (62.5%)	644,955 (24.6%)	67,843 (2.6%)	2,621,954 (12.6%)
TRANSLEITHANIA	10,050,575 (48.1%)	2,037,435 (9.8%)	1,967,970 (9.4%)	2,949,032 (14.1%)	472,587 (2.3%)	1,833,162 (8.8%)	1,106,471 (5.3%)	469,255 (2.2%)	20,886,487 (100.0%)

== See also ==
- Demographics of Hungary
- Demographic history of Syrmia

== Sources ==
- Révai Nagy Lexikona Encyclopedia of Révai (1911)
