= Doboka County =

Historical county in Transylvania, Hungary

Doboka County is a former county in Transylvania, Kingdom of Hungary. It took its name from the castle and village Dăbâca (Hungarian: Doboka). The county stretched 150 km from east to west, and 20-30 km from north to south. Its seat was the town Bonțida (Hungarian: Bonchida). At the 1876 Hungarian county reform, its territority was divided over the new counties Szolnok-Doboka, Beszterce-Naszód and Szilágy and the existing county Kolozs.
