= Kolozs County =

County of the Kingdom of Hungary

Kolozs County Comitatus Kolosiensis (Latin) Kolozs vármegye (Hungarian) Komitat Klausenburg (German) Comitatul Cluj (Romanian)
- County of the Kingdom of Hungary (11th century-1526); County of the Eastern Hungarian Kingdom (1526–1570); County of the Principality of Transylvania (1570–1867); County of the Kingdom of Hungary (1867–1920, 1940–1945)
- Coat of arms

- Capital: Kolozsvár
- Area
  - Coordinates: 46°46′N 23°36′E
  - 1910: 5,006 km^{2} (1,933 sq mi)
- Population
  - 1910: 286,700
- History
  - Established: 11th century
  - Treaty of Trianon: 4 June 1920
  - County recreated (Second Vienna Award): 30 August 1940
  - Disestablished: 1945
- Today part of: Romania
- Cluj-Napoca is the current name of the capital.

Kolozs County was an administrative county (comitatus) of the Kingdom of Hungary, of the Eastern Hungarian Kingdom and of the Principality of Transylvania. Its territory is now in north-western Romania (north-western Transylvania). The capital of the county was Kolozsvár (present-day Cluj-Napoca).

== Geography ==
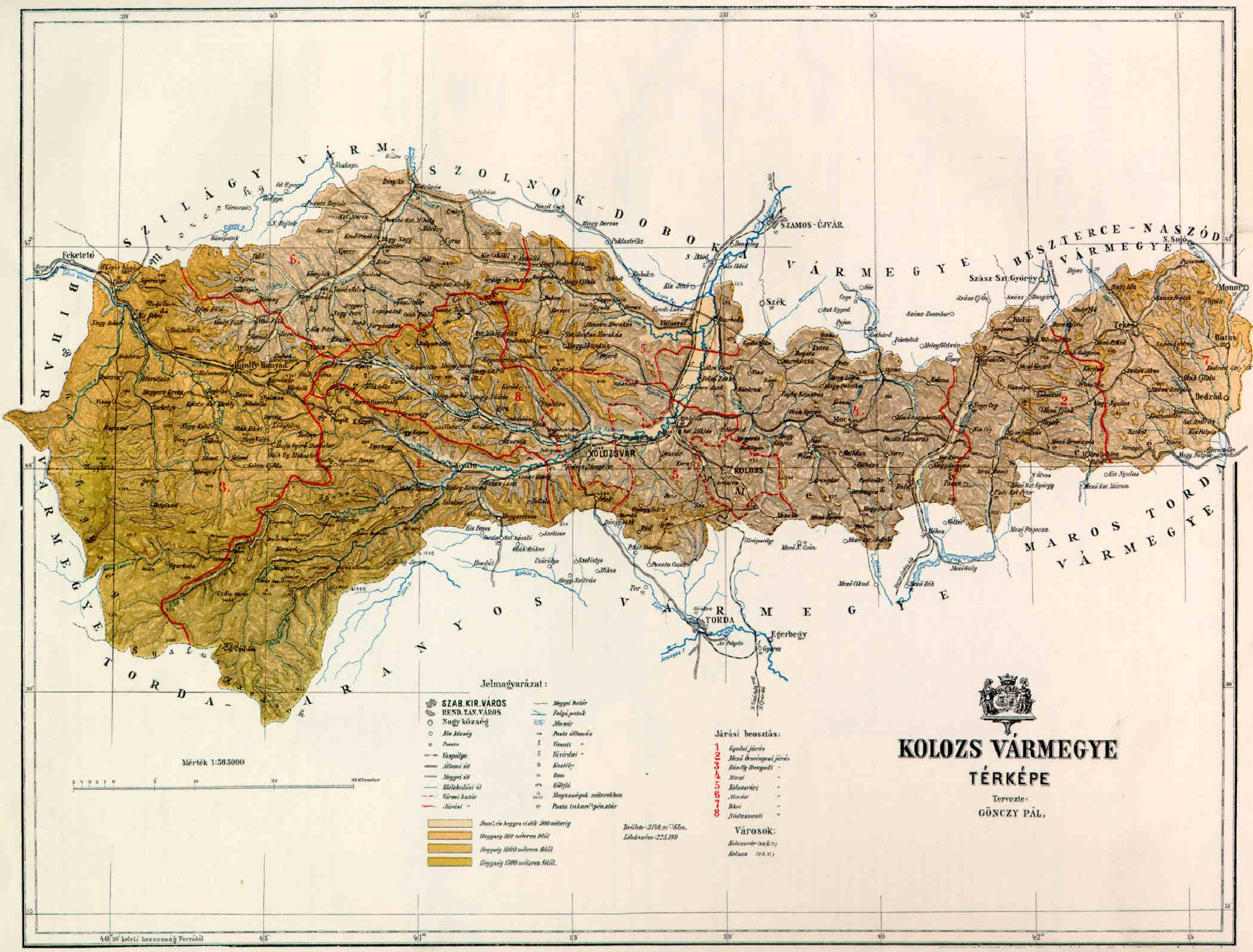
Map of Kolozs County, 1891.

After 1876, Kolozs County shared borders with the Hungarian counties Bihar, Szilágy, Szolnok-Doboka, Beszterce-Naszód, Maros-Torda, and Torda-Aranyos. The rivers Crișul Repede and Someșul Mic flowed through the county. Its area was 5,006 km^{2} (1,933 sq mi) in 1910.

== History ==
Kolozs County was formed in the 11th century. In 1876, when the administrative structure of Transylvania was changed, the territory of Kolozs was modified and some villages of Doboka County (which was then disbanded) were annexed to it. In 1920, by the Treaty of Trianon, the county became part of Romania. Following the Second Vienna Award, large part of it was retaken by Hungary in 1940 and the county was recreated; however, after World War II it became part of Romania again. Most of the territory of the county lies in the present Romanian county Cluj, some parts of the county are in the present Romanian counties Sălaj (north-west), Bistrița-Năsăud (north-east), and Mureș (south-east).

== Demographics ==
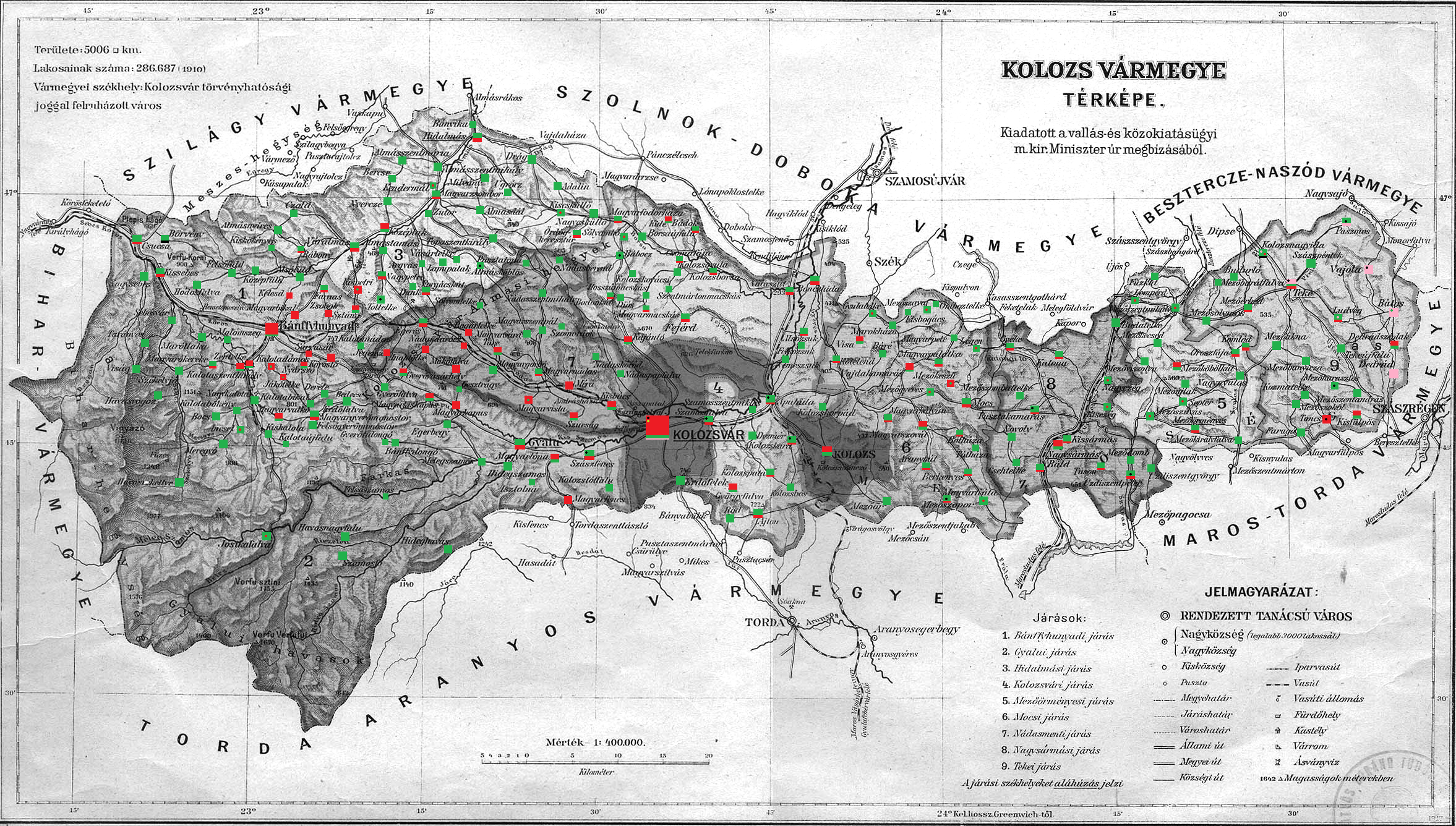
Ethnic map of the county with data of the 1910 census (see the key in the description)

Population by mother tongue (Note: Only linguistic communities > 1% are displayed.)
Census	Total	Romanian	Hungarian	German	Other or unknown
1880	196,307	112,627 (59.31%)	63,005 (33.18%)	7,667 (4.04%)	6,587 (3.47%)
1890	225,199	133,277 (59.18%)	77,271 (34.31%)	8,081 (3.59%)	6,570 (2.92%)
1900	253,656	146,268 (57.66%)	95,626 (37.70%)	9,058 (3.57%)	2,704 (1.07%)
1910	286,687	161,279 (56.26%)	111,439 (38.87%)	8,386 (2.93%)	5,583 (1.95%)

Population by religion (Note: Only religious communities > 1% are displayed.)
Census	Total	Greek Catholic	Calvinist	Eastern Orthodox	Roman Catholic	Jewish	Lutheran	Unitarian	Other or unknown
1880	196,307	90,265 (45.98%)	44,525 (22.68%)	29,110 (14.83%)	18,016 (9.18%)	4,782 (2.44%)	7,380 (3.76%)	2,083 (1.06%)	146 (0.07%)
1890	225,199	103,681 (46.04%)	51,213 (22.74%)	33,281 (14.78%)	19,972 (8.87%)	6,727 (2.99%)	7,700 (3.42%)	2,515 (1.12%)	110 (0.05%)
1900	253,656	113,136 (44.60%)	58,297 (22.98%)	36,578 (14.42%)	24,821 (9.79%)	9,858 (3.89%)	7,864 (3.10%)	3,020 (1.19%)	82 (0.03%)
1910	286,687	126,217 (44.03%)	65,910 (22.99%)	41,715 (14.55%)	28,427 (9.92%)	12,581 (4.39%)	8,167 (2.85%)	3,331 (1.16%)	339 (0.12%)

== Subdivisions ==
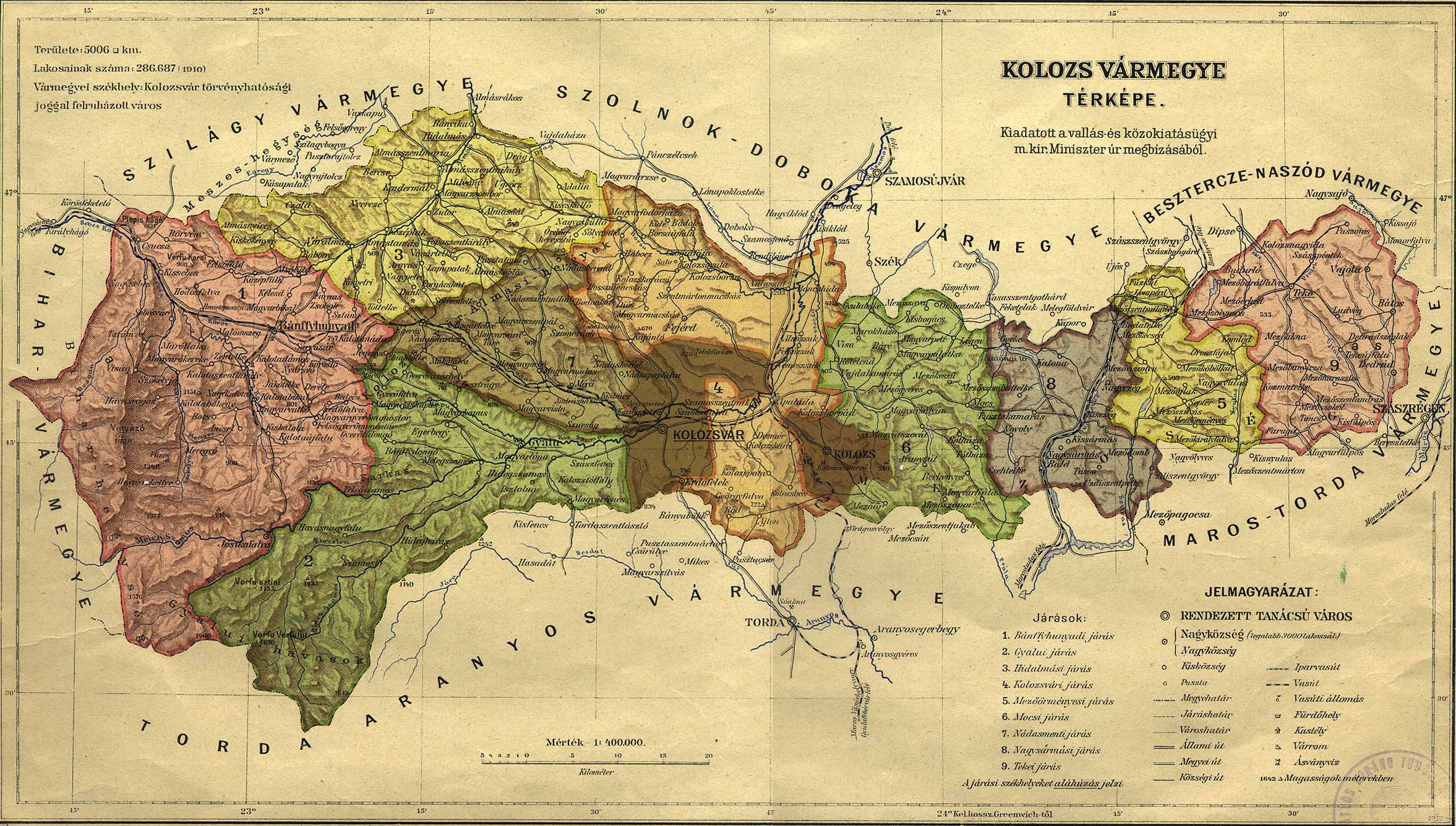

In the early 20th century, the subdivisions of Kolozs County were:

Districts (járás)
District	Capital
Bánffyhunyad	Bánffyhunyad (now Huedin)
Gyalu	Gyalu (now Gilău)
Hídalmás	Hídalmás (now Hida)
Kolozsvár	Kolozsvár (now Cluj)
Mezőörményes	Mezőörményes (now Urmeniș)
Mocs	Mocs (now Mociu)
Nádasment	Kolozsvár (now Cluj)
Nagysármás	Nagysármás (now Sărmașu)
Teke	Teke (now Teaca)
Urban counties (törvényhatósági jogú város)
Kolozsvár (now Cluj)
Urban districts (rendezett tanácsú város)
Kolozs (now Cojocna)
