= Szolnok-Doboka County =

County of the Kingdom of Hungary

Szolnok-Doboka County Comitatus Szolnokiensis-Dobociensis (Latin) Szolnok-Doboka vármegye (Hungarian) Komitat Szolnok-Doboka (German) Comitatul Solnoc-Dăbâca (Romanian)
- County of the Kingdom of Hungary (1876-1920, 1940-1945)
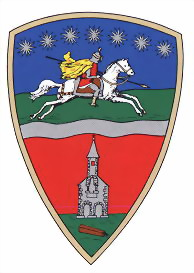
- Coat of arms

- Capital: Dés
- Area
  - Coordinates: 47°9′N 23°52′E
  - 1910: 4,786 km^{2} (1,848 sq mi)
- Population
  - 1910: 251,936
- History
  - Established: 1876
  - Treaty of Trianon: 4 June 1920
  - County recreated (Second Vienna Award): 30 August 1940
  - Disestablished: 1945
- Today part of: Romania
- Dej is the current name of the capital.

Szolnok-Doboka was an administrative county (comitatus) of the Kingdom of Hungary. Its territory is now in northern Romania (northern Transylvania). The capital of the county was Dés (now Dej, Romania).

== Geography ==
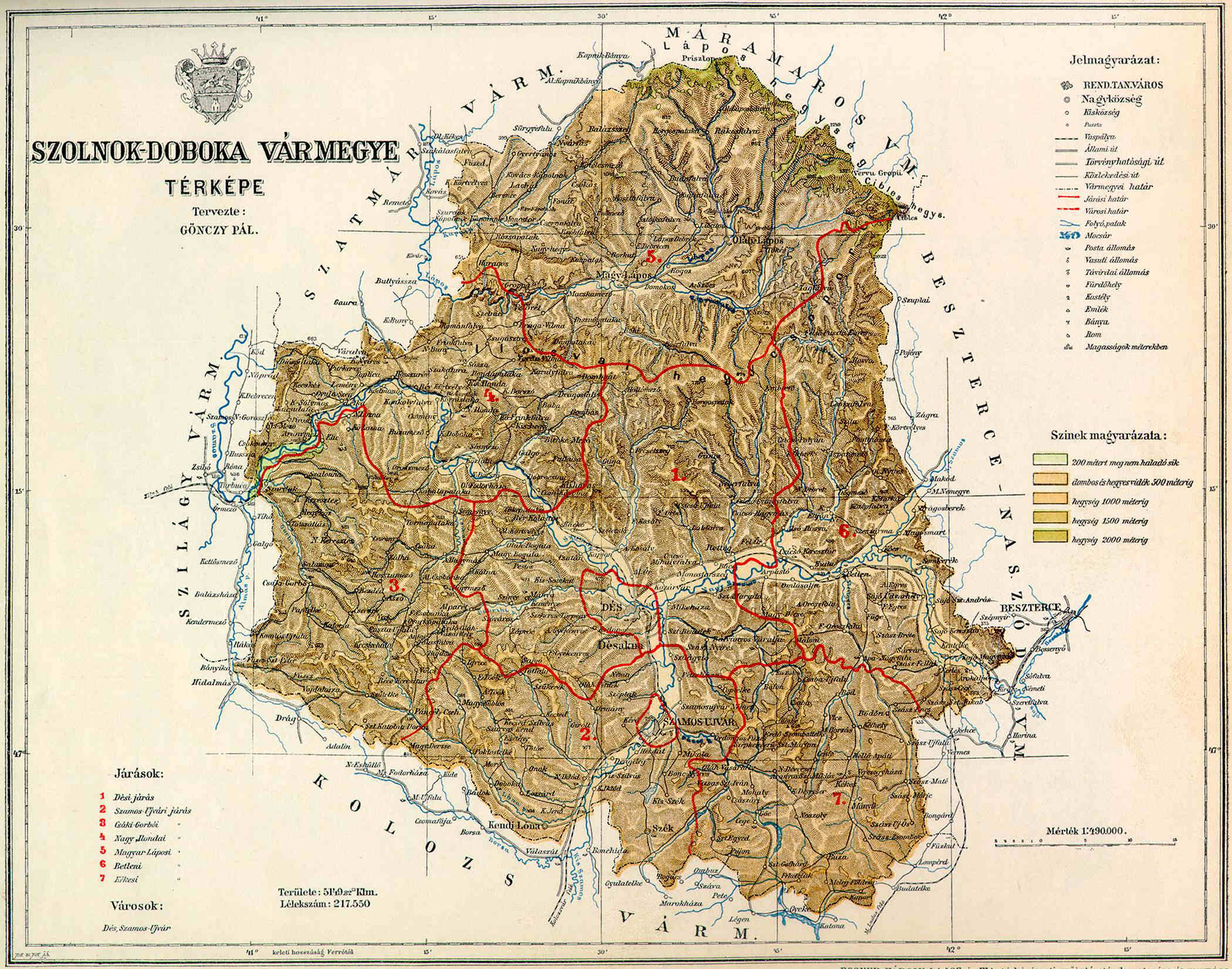
Map of Szolnok-Doboka, 1891.

Szolnok-Doboka county shared borders with the Hungarian counties Szilágy, Szatmár, Máramaros, Beszterce-Naszód and Kolozs. The river Someş flowed through the county. Its area was 4,786 square kilometres (1,848 sq mi) around 1910.

== History ==
Szolnok-Doboka county was formed in 1876, when Belső-Szolnok county (its center was Dés/Dej), most of Doboka county (its center was Doboka/Dăbâca at first, later Szamosújvár/Gherla) and the eastern part of the Kővárvidék/Chioar district were united.

In 1920, by the Treaty of Trianon, the county became part of Romania, except from 1940 until the end of World War II, when it was returned to Hungary by the Second Vienna Award, with a slightly modified territory. The territory of the county is now divided between the Romanian counties of Cluj (the center and south, a.o. Dej), Maramureș (the north), Bistrița-Năsăud (the east) and Sălaj (the west).

== Demographics ==
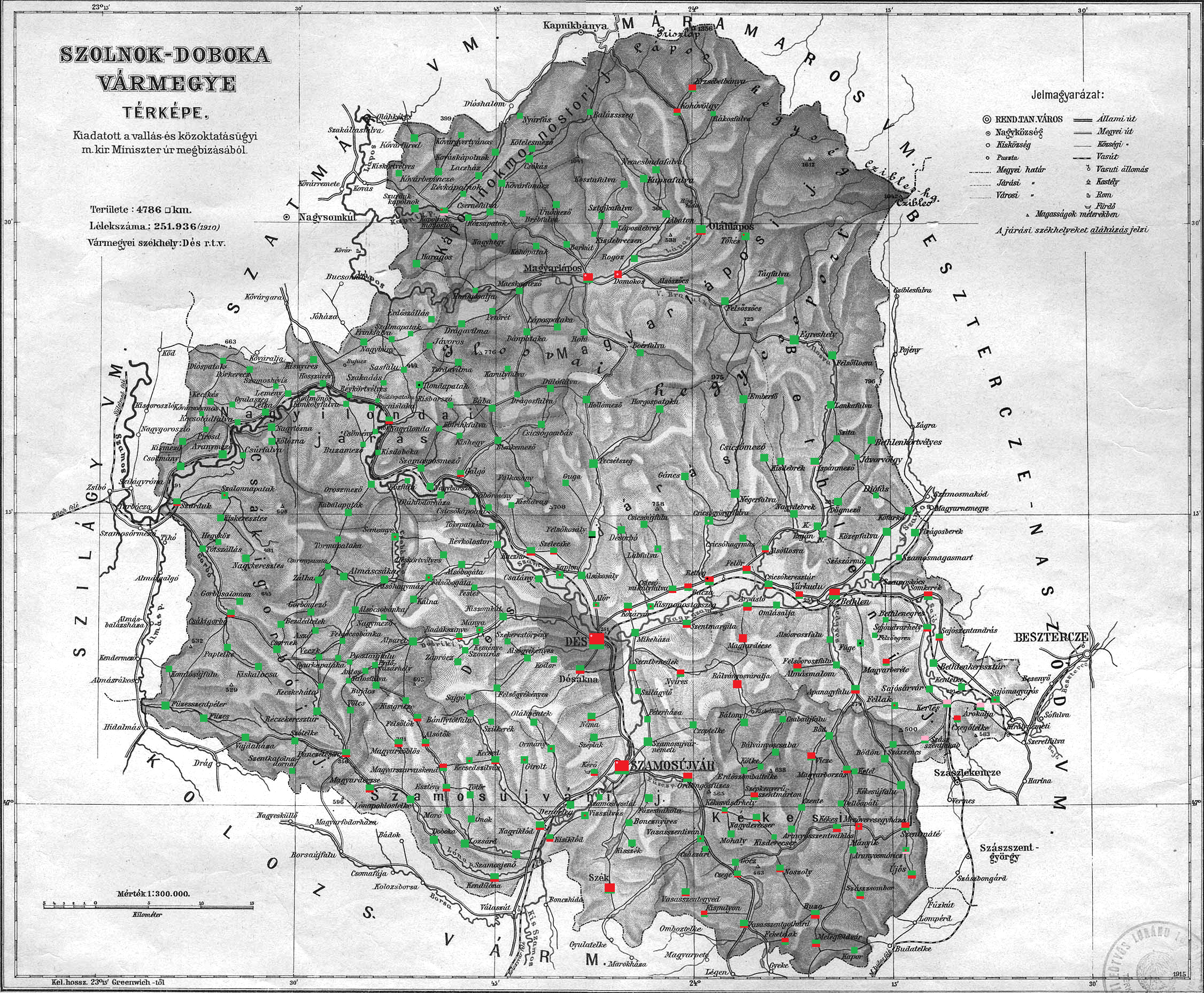
Ethnic map of the county with data of the 1910 census (see the key in the description)

Population by mother tongue (Note: Only linguistic communities > 1% are displayed.)
Census	Total	Romanian	Hungarian	German	Other or unknown
1880	193,677	146,135 (77.83%)	31,559 (16.81%)	4,604 (2.45%)	5,465 (2.91%)
1890	217,550	166,806 (76.67%)	38,961 (17.91%)	6,234 (2.87%)	5,549 (2.55%)
1900	237,134	180,309 (76.04%)	47,212 (19.91%)	7,252 (3.06%)	2,361 (1.00%)
1910	251,936	189,443 (75.19%)	52,181 (20.71%)	6,902 (2.74%)	3,410 (1.35%)

Population by religion (Note: Only religious communities > 1% are displayed.)
Census	Total	Greek Catholic	Eastern Orthodox	Calvinist	Jewish	Roman Catholic	Other or unknown
1880	193,677	119,154 (61.52%)	31,549 (16.29%)	24,303 (12.55%)	7,589 (3.92%)	7,523 (3.88%)	3,559 (1.84%)
1890	217,550	133,198 (61.23%)	35,032 (16.10%)	27,283 (12.54%)	9,890 (4.55%)	8,670 (3.99%)	3,477 (1.60%)
1900	237,134	147,322 (62.13%)	36,247 (15.29%)	30,353 (12.80%)	11,791 (4.97%)	9,164 (3.86%)	2,257 (0.95%)
1910	251,936	155,364 (61.67%)	38,608 (15.32%)	32,230 (12.79%)	12,797 (5.08%)	10,522 (4.18%)	2,415 (0.96%)

== Subdivisions ==
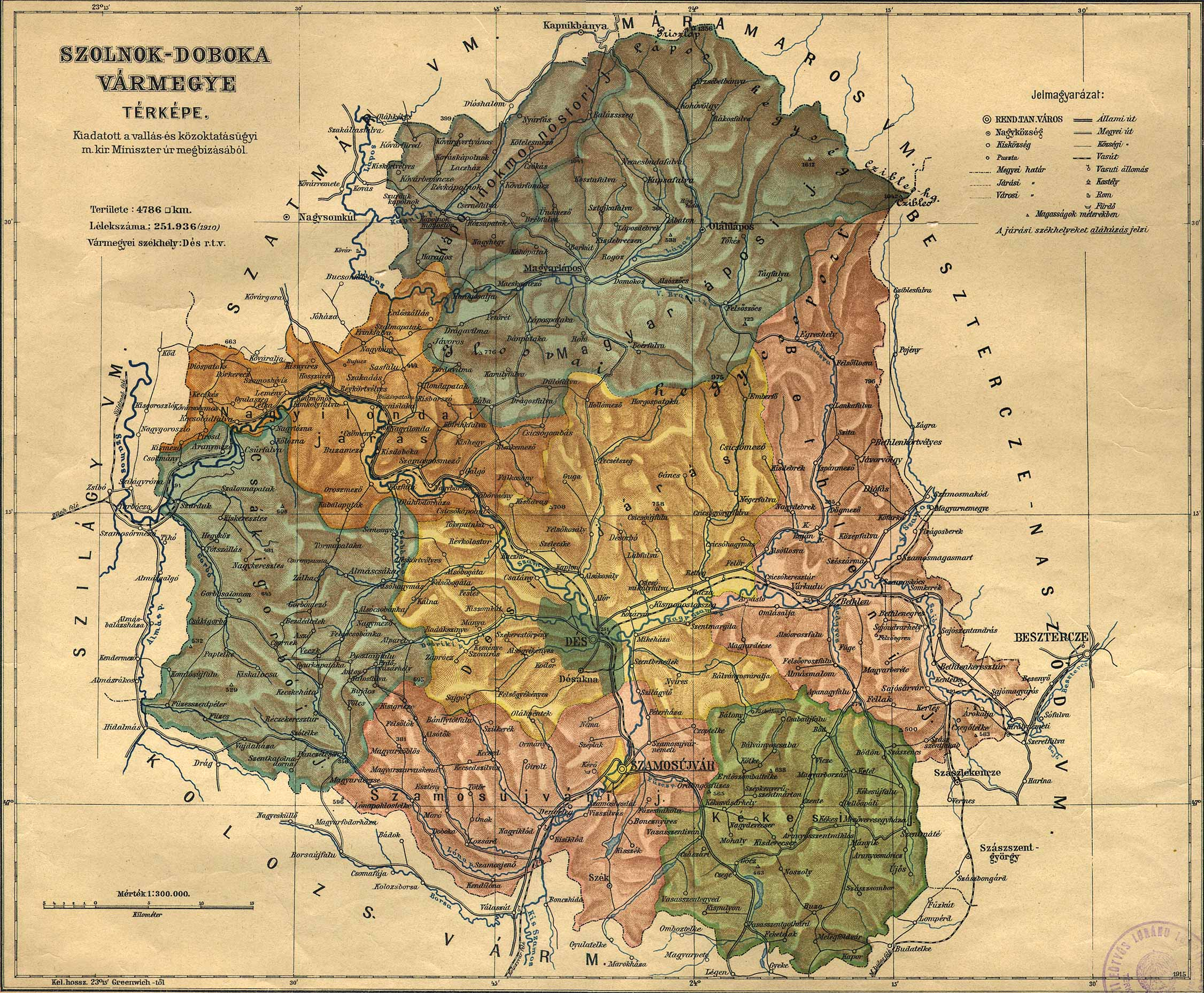
Administrative divisions of Szolnok-Doboka County.

In the early 20th century, the subdivisions of Szolnok-Doboka county were:

Districts (járás)
District	Capital
Bethlen	Bethlen (now Beclean)
Csákigorbó	Csákigorbó (now Gârbou)
Dés	Dés (now Dej)
Kápolnokmonostor (from 1907)	Kápolnokmonostor (now Copalnic-Mănăștur)
Kékes	Kékes (now Chiochiș)
Magyarlápos	Magyarlápos (now Târgu Lăpuş)
Nagyilonda	Nagyilonda (now Ileanda)
Szamosújvár	Szamosújvár (now Gherla)
Urban districts (rendezett tanácsú város)
Dés (now Dej)
Szamosújvár (now Gherla)
