= Beszterce-Naszód County =

County of the Kingdom of Hungary

Beszterce-Naszód County Comitatus Bistriciensis-Naszodiensis (Latin) Beszterce-Naszód vármegye (Hungarian) Komitat Bistritz-Naszod (German) Comitatul Bistriţa-Năsăud (Romanian)
- County of the Kingdom of Hungary (1876-1920, 1940-1945)
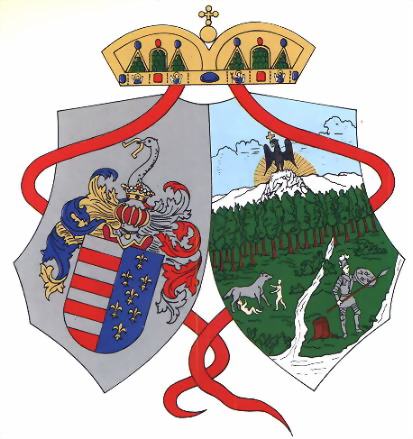
- Coat of arms

- Capital: Beszterce
- Area
  - Coordinates: 47°8′N 24°30′E
  - 1910: 4,167 km^{2} (1,609 sq mi)
- Population
  - 1910: 127,800
- History
  - Established: 1876
  - Treaty of Trianon: 4 June 1920
  - County recreated (Second Vienna Award): 30 August 1940
  - Disestablished: 1945
- Today part of: Romania
- Bistrița is the current name of the capital.

Beszterce-Naszód was an administrative county (comitatus) of the Kingdom of Hungary. Its territory is now in northern Romania (north-eastern Transylvania). The capital of the county was Beszterce (now Bistrița).

== Geography ==
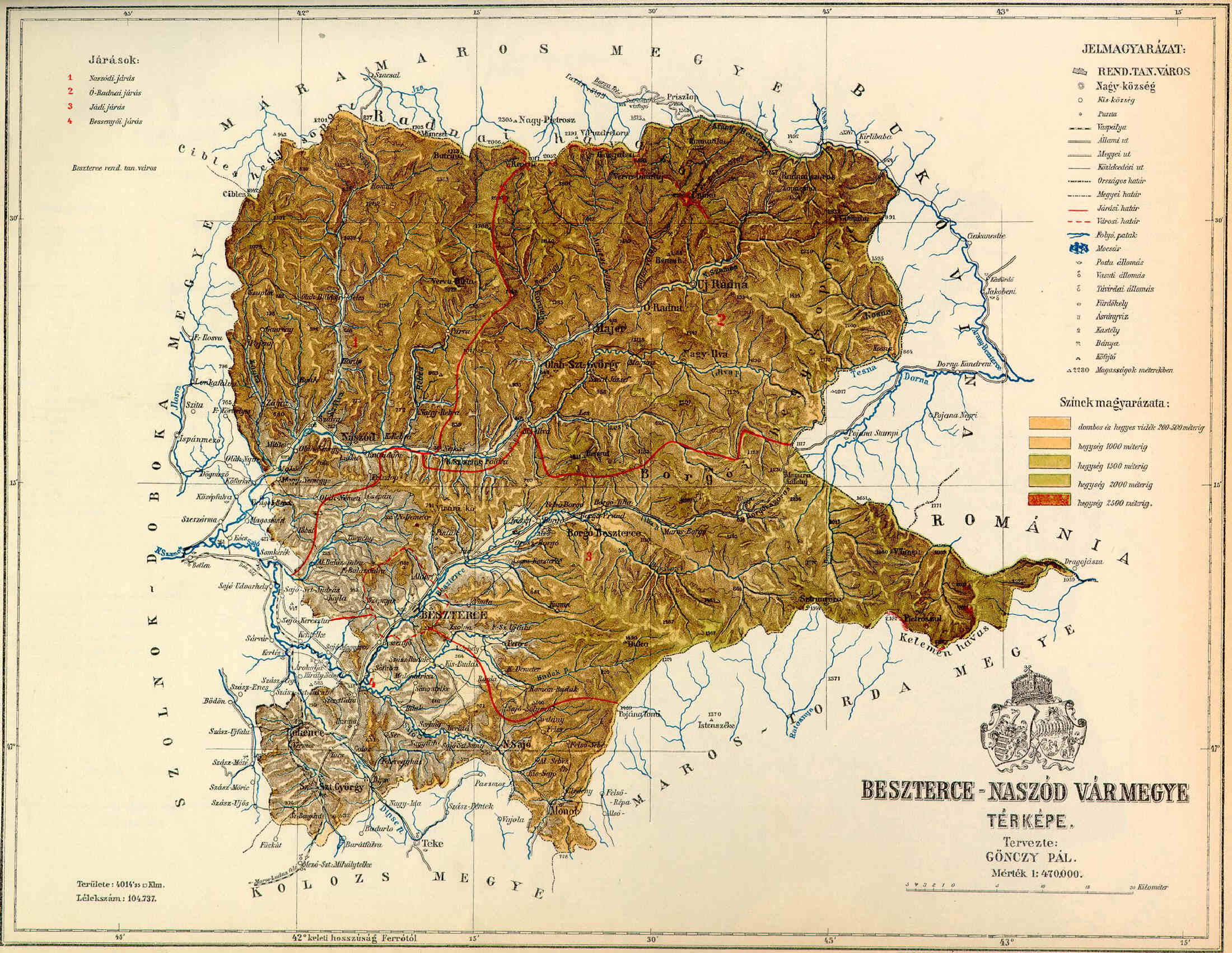
Map of Beszterce-Naszód, 1891.

Beszterce-Naszód county shared borders with the Kingdom of Romania, Austrian Bukovina and the Hungarian counties of Máramaros, Szolnok-Doboka, Kolozs, Maros-Torda and Csík. Its area was 4,167 km² around 1910.

== History ==
Beszterce-Naszód county was formed in 1876, when the Saxon district of Bistritz/Bistrița was united with the former Transylvanian Military Frontier district of Năsăud (Romanian Border Regiment II), also joined by parts of the former Doboka and Belső-Szolnok counties. In 1920, the Treaty of Trianon assigned the territory of Beszterce-Naszód county to Romania. In 1940, by the Second Vienna Award, it was returned to Hungary and was expanded with additional territories from the former Kolozs County. After World War II, it became again part of Romania; the territory of the county is now in the (larger) Romanian county Bistrița-Năsăud.

== Demographics ==
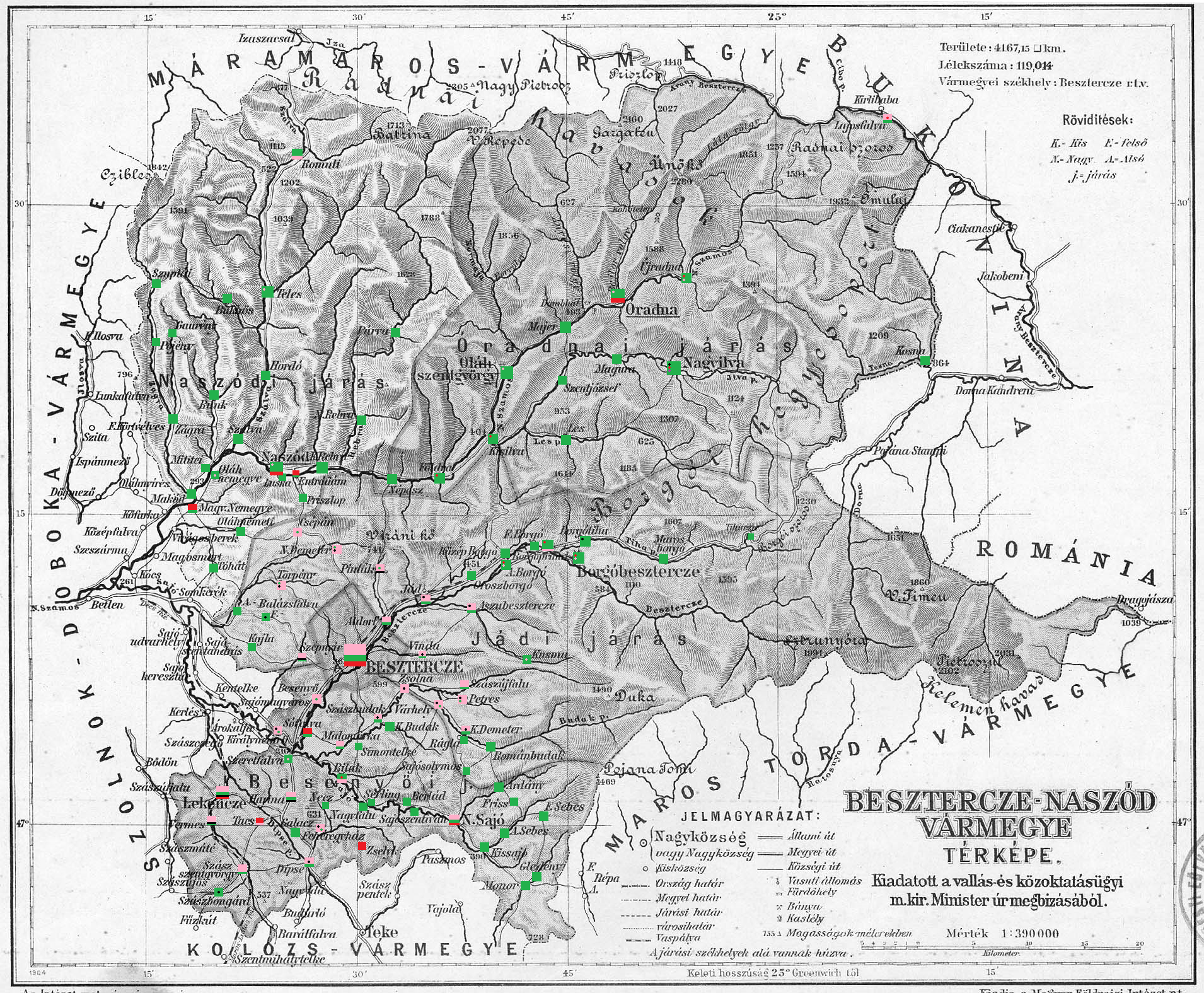
Ethnic map of the county with data of the 1910 census (see the key in the description)

Population by mother tongue (Note: Only linguistic communities > 1% are displayed.)
Census	Total	Romanian	German	Hungarian	Other or unknown
1880	95,017	62,048 (67.47%)	23,113 (25.13%)	3,540 (3.85%)	3,260 (3.54%)
1890	104,737	70,466 (67.28%)	25,268 (24.13%)	4,994 (4.77%)	4,009 (3.83%)
1900	119,014	82,256 (69.11%)	26,036 (21.88%)	8,475 (7.12%)	2,247 (1.89%)
1910	127,843	87,564 (68.49%)	25,609 (20.03%)	10,737 (8.40%)	3,933 (3.08%)

Population by religion (Note: Only religious communities > 1% are displayed.)
Census	Total	Greek Catholic	Lutheran	Eastern Orthodox	Jewish	Roman Catholic	Calvinist	Other or unknown
1880	95,017	52,571 (55.33%)	22,129 (23.29%)	12,554 (13.21%)	2,963 (3.12%)	2,644 (2.78%)	2,087 (2.20%)	69 (0.07%)
1890	104,737	58,878 (56.22%)	22,556 (21.54%)	12,960 (12.37%)	4,349 (4.15%)	3,337 (3.19%)	2,588 (2.47%)	69 (0.07%)
1900	119,014	66,078 (55.52%)	22,874 (19.22%)	15,290 (12.85%)	6,385 (5.36%)	4,927 (4.14%)	3,349 (2.81%)	111 (0.09%)
1910	127,843	72,494 (56.71%)	22,415 (17.53%)	16,615 (13.00%)	7,254 (5.67%)	5,083 (3.98%)	3,781 (2.96%)	201 (0.16%)

== Subdivisions ==
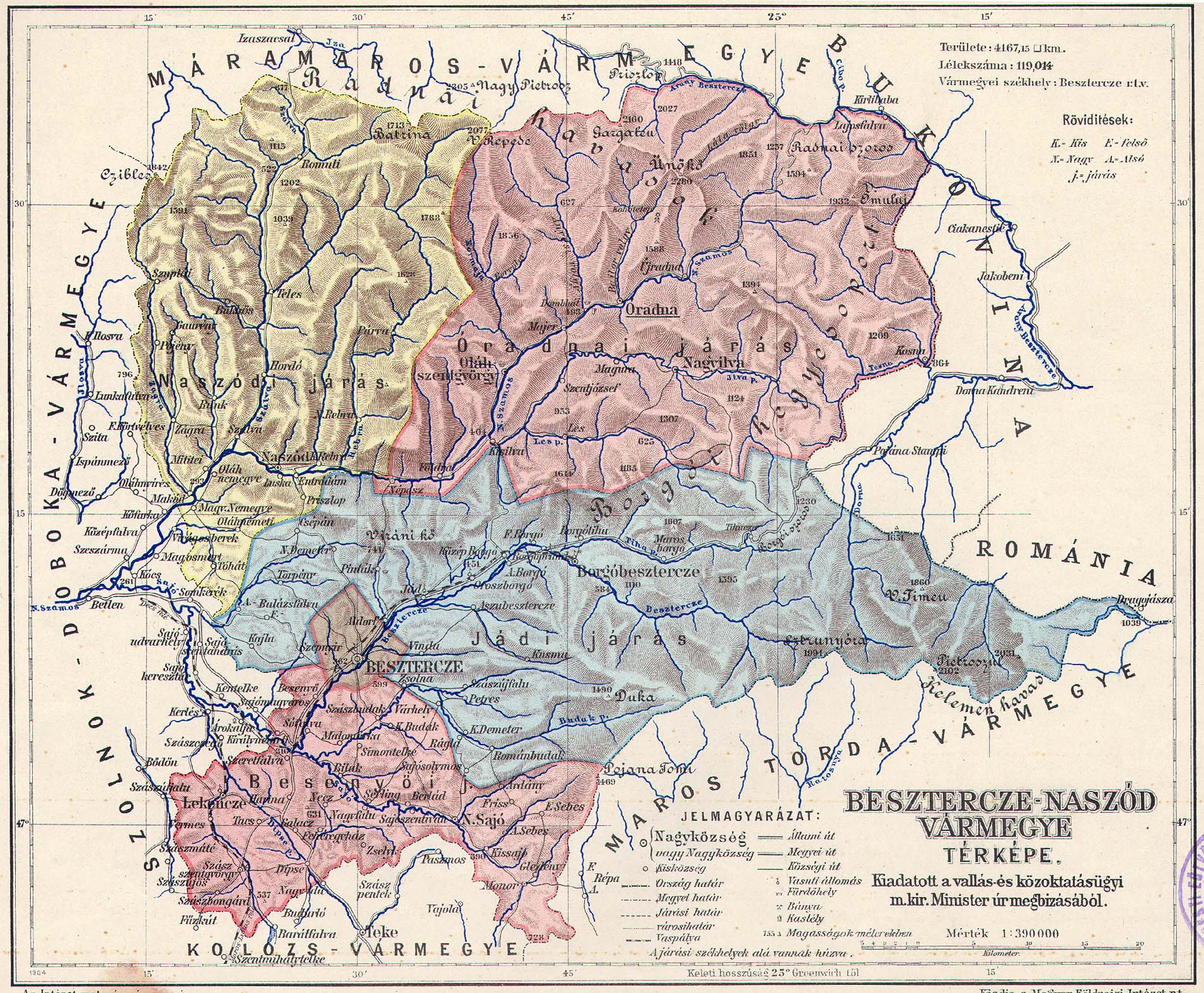

In the early 20th century, the subdivisions of the county Beszterce-Naszód were:

Districts (járás)
District	Capital
Besenyő	Beszterce (now Bistrița)
Jád	Jád (now Livezile)
Naszód	Naszód (now Năsăud)
Óradna	Óradna (now Rodna)
Urban districts (rendezett tanácsú város)
Beszterce (now Bistrița)

== See also ==
- Bistrița-Năsăud County of Romania
