= Maros-Torda County =

Administrative county (comitatus) of the Kingdom of Hungary

Maros-Torda County Comitatus Marosiensis et Tordensis (Latin) Maros-Torda vármegye (Hungarian) Komitat Mieresch-Thorenburg (German) Comitatul Mureş-Turda (Romanian)
- County of the Kingdom of Hungary (1876-1920, 1940-1945)
- Coat of arms

- Capital: Marosvásárhely
- Area
  - Coordinates: 46°33′N 24°34′E
  - 1910: 4,203 km^{2} (1,623 sq mi)
- Population
  - 1910: 219,589
- History
  - Established: 1876
  - Treaty of Trianon: 4 June 1920
  - County recreated (Second Vienna Award): 30 August 1940
  - Disestablished: 1945
- Today part of: Romania
- Târgu Mureș is the current name of the capital.

Maros-Torda was an administrative county (comitatus) of the Kingdom of Hungary. Its territory is now in central Romania (eastern Transylvania) and has been administratively succeeded by county Mureș which consist of about half the territory of the previous Maros-Torda administrative county. Its county seat was Marosvásárhely (present-day Târgu Mureș).

== Geography ==
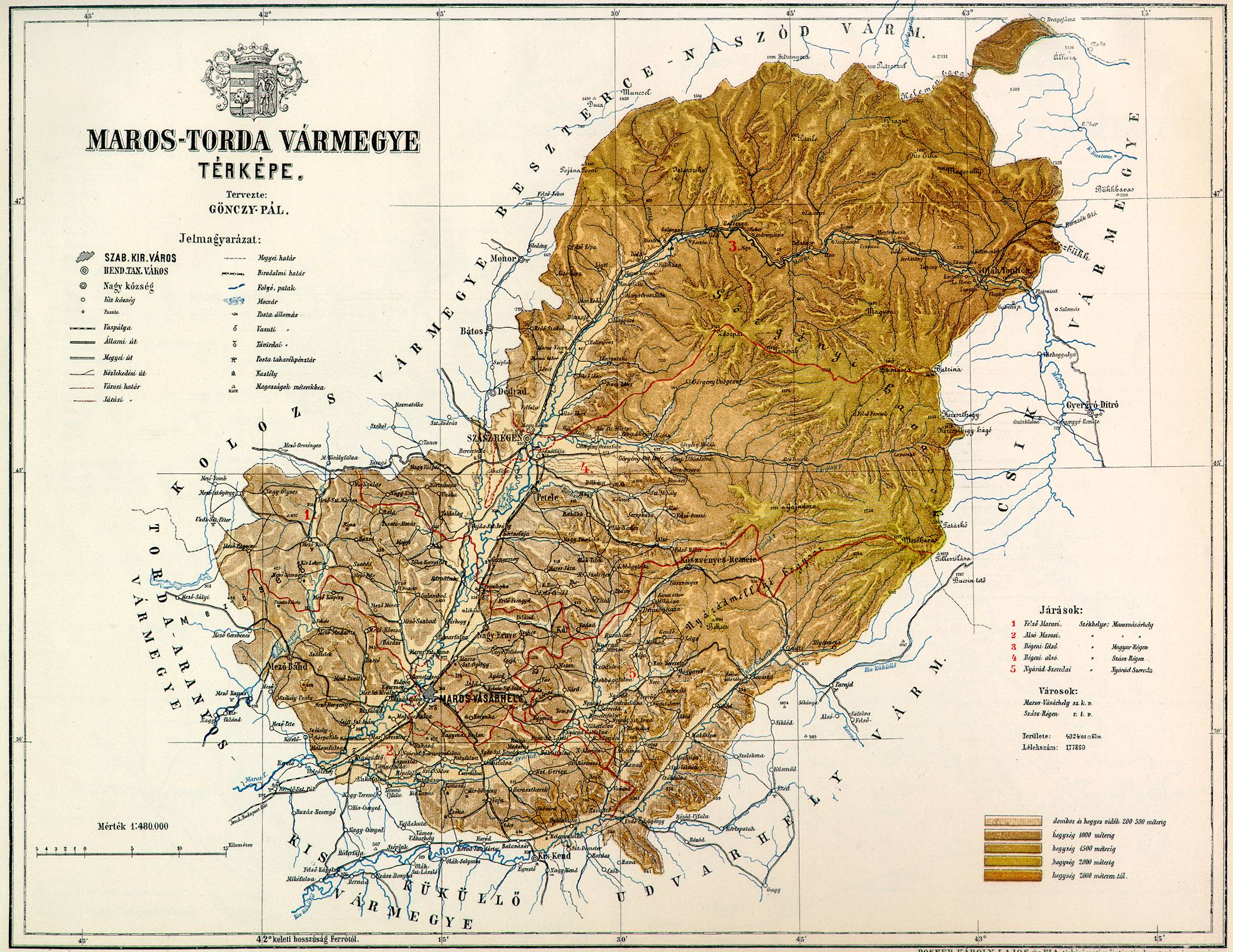
Map of Maros-Torda, 1891.

Maros-Torda county shared borders with the Hungarian counties Kolozs, Beszterce-Naszód, Csík, Udvarhely, Kis-Küküllő and Torda-Aranyos. The river Mureș flowed through the county. Its area was 4,188 km^{2} around 1910.

== History ==
Maros-Torda county was formed in 1876 on the territory of the Székely seat of Marosszék and part of Torda County. In 1920, after the Treaty of Trianon, the county became part of Romania, except after the Second Vienna Award, between 1940 until the end of World War II, when much of the county's territory was awarded to Hungary. Today, its territory lies in the present (larger) Romanian county Mureș.

== Demographics ==
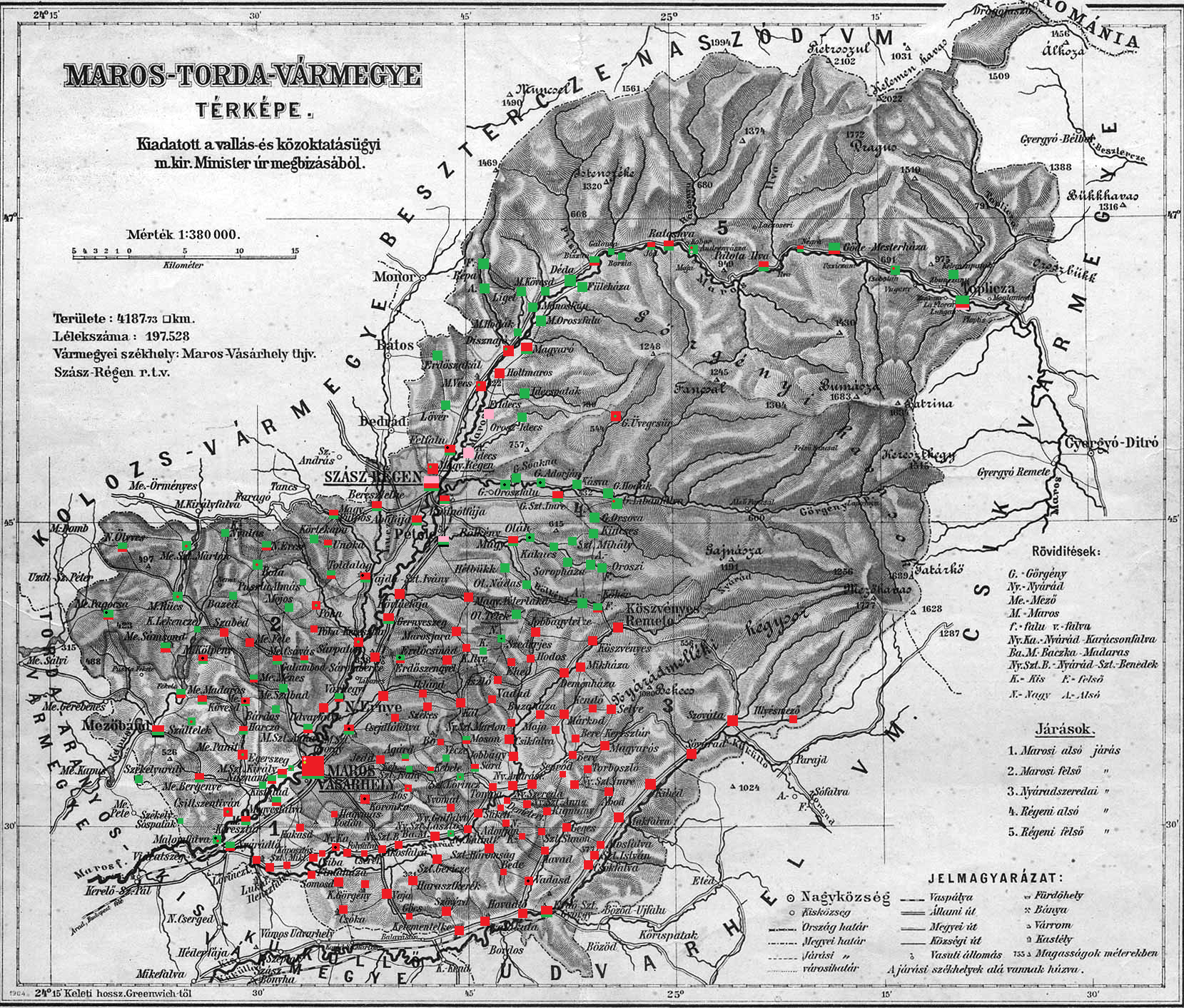
Ethnic map of the county with data of the 1910 census (see the key in the description)

Population by mother tongue (Note: Only linguistic communities > 1% are displayed.)
Census	Total	Hungarian	Romanian	German	Other or unknown
1880	158,999	86,497 (56.50%)	53,650 (35.05%)	6,274 (4.10%)	6,658 (4.35%)
1890	177,860	102,572 (57.67%)	62,179 (34.96%)	6,438 (3.62%)	6,671 (3.75%)
1900	197,618	119,810 (60.63%)	67,402 (34.11%)	7,446 (3.77%)	2,960 (1.50%)
1910	219,589	134,166 (61.10%)	71,909 (32.75%)	8,312 (3.79%)	5,202 (2.37%)

Population by religion (Note: Only religious communities > 1% are displayed.)
Census	Total	Calvinist	Greek Catholic	Eastern Orthodox	Roman Catholic	Unitarian	Jewish	Lutheran	Other or unknown
1880	158,999	64,522 (40.58%)	35,636 (22.41%)	24,151 (15.19%)	19,450 (12.23%)	6,451 (4.06%)	2,999 (1.89%)	5,592 (3.52%)	198 (0.12%)
1890	177,860	71,840 (40.39%)	40,235 (22.62%)	26,787 (15.06%)	22,207 (12.49%)	7,212 (4.05%)	3,735 (2.10%)	5,826 (3.28%)	18 (0.01%)
1900	197,618	78,907 (39.93%)	44,507 (22.52%)	28,989 (14.67%)	26,046 (13.18%)	7,917 (4.01%)	5,000 (2.53%)	6,205 (3.14%)	47 (0.02%)
1910	219,589	85,692 (39.02%)	49,911 (22.73%)	31,266 (14.24%)	30,828 (14.04%)	7,894 (3.59%)	7,550 (3.44%)	6,442 (2.93%)	6 (0.00%)

== Subdivisions ==
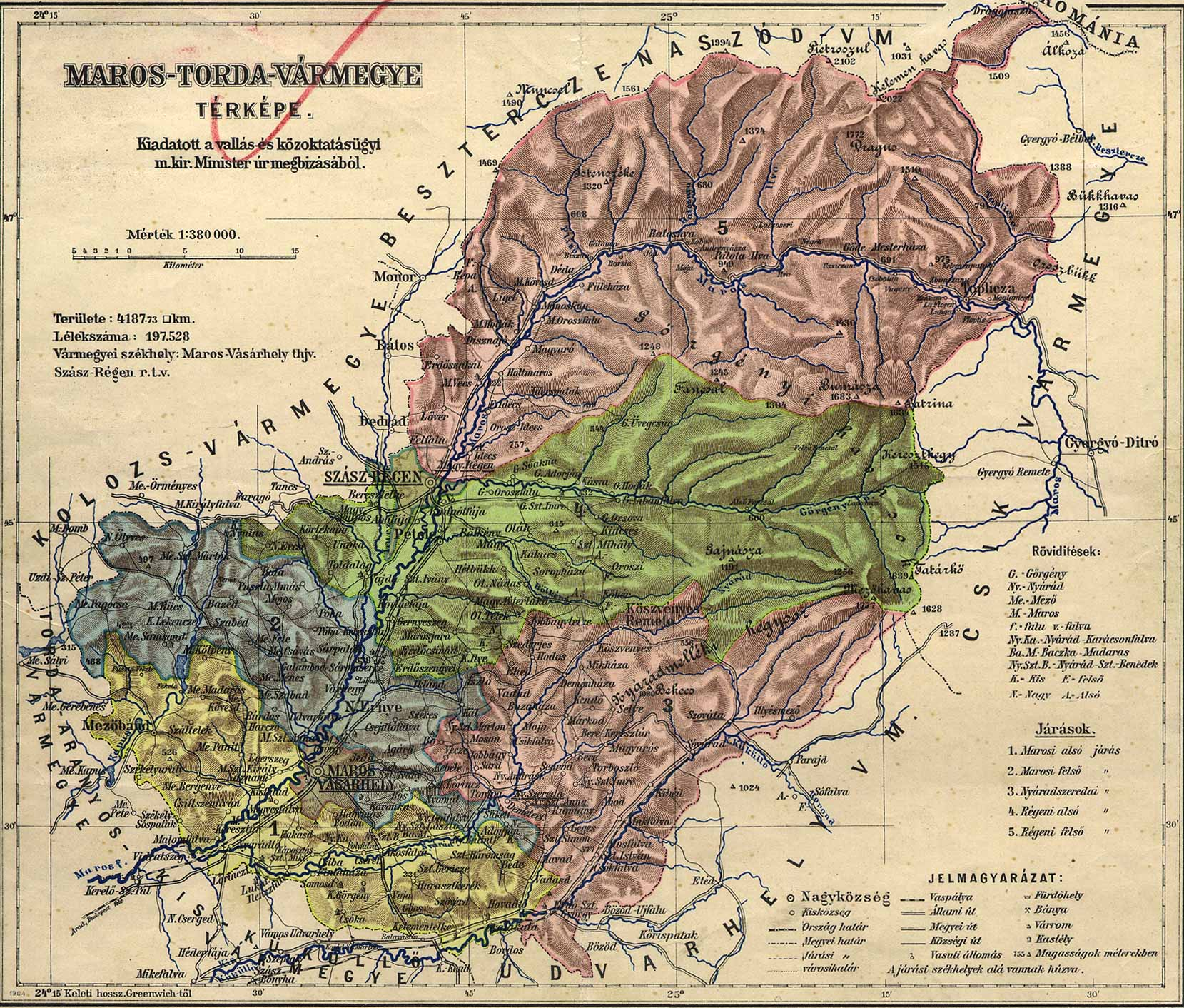
Contemporary map about the county

Around 1910, the subdivisions of Maros-Torda county were:

Districts (járás)
District	Capital
Marosi alsó	Marosvásárhely (now Târgu Mureș)
Marosi felső	Marosvásárhely (now Târgu Mureș)
Nyárádszereda	Nyárádszereda (now Miercurea Nirajului)
Régeni alsó	Szászrégen (now Reghin)
Régeni felső	Magyarrégen (now Reghin-Sat)
Urban counties (törvényhatósági jogú város)
Marosvásárhely (now Târgu Mureș)
Urban districts (rendezett tanácsú város)
Szászrégen (now Reghin)

== See also ==
- Torda County
