= Counties of Hungary (1000–1920) =

Historic administration unit in Hungary

Map of 71 counties in the Lands of the Hungarian Crown (the Kingdom of Hungary proper and Kingdom of Croatia-Slavonia) around 1880

A county (Hungarian: vármegye 'castle-county' or megye) is the name of a type of administrative unit in Hungary.

This article deals with counties in the former Kingdom of Hungary from the 10th century until the Treaty of Trianon of 1920. For lists of individual counties, see: Administrative divisions of the Kingdom of Hungary. For counties of Hungary since 1950, see: Counties of Hungary.

== Nomenclature ==
=== Origin of the name ===
The Latin word comitatus is derived from the word comes, which originally stood for companion or retinue member. In the Early and High Middle Ages, the title comes was a noble title used with various meanings, in the Kingdom of Hungary especially (but not exclusively) with the meaning "county head".

The Hungarian word megye is likely derived from Southern Slavic medja (međa, међа) meaning approximately territorial border. The Slavic word in turn is related to Latin medius (middle) through a common Indo-European root. The original word is still used in present-day Slavic languages: in Slovak (as medza), in Slovenian (as meja), in Serbo-Croatian (as međa, међа), in a similar sense, and in Hungarian it seems to have meant, initially, the border of a county. Hungarian has another word (mezsgye) of the same origin meaning borderland.

The Hungarian word ispán (county head) is derived from the Southern Slavic word župan (жупан), which was used by the Slavs living in the Carpathian Basin before the arrival of the Hungarians and stood for the head of various territorial units. The title župan was also used as a ruling title in medieval Serbia.

==== Comitatus vs. county ====
For centuries, the official written language of the Kingdom of Hungary was Latin. The Latin word for the English and Hungarian county, comitatus, is sometimes used in English.

== Terminology in various languages ==
=== County ===
Royal county (11th–13th centuries)

- Latin parochia / provincia / compagus civitatis / comitatus /mega (and other names)
- in later Hungarian : vármegye/ megye / várispánság
- in later Slovak: (kráľovský) komitát / župa / hradské španstvo,
- in later German (Burg-)Komitat / (Burg-)Gespanschaft / (rarely) Ispanschaft.

Some Hungarian historians distinguish between the functions of a vármegye (led by a comes comitatus) and those of a várispánság (led by a comes civitatis), usually arguing that the administrative unit called vármegye sometimes included several military units called várispánság. This system was created by the state founder monarch Stephen I of Hungary.

Noble county (13th century to 1848)

- Latin: comitatus (no other form from the 13th century onwards)
- Hungarian: vármegye / megye (in the Middle Ages both, later mainly vármegye, from 1949 exclusively megye)
- Slovak: stolica / župa (modernised county župa only)
- German: Gespanschaft / Komitat / (rarely) Grafschaft (modernised county usually Gespanschaft)
- Croatian: županija
- French: comitat

=== District ===
- Latin: processus / reambulatio
- Hungarian: (szolgabírói) járás
- Slovak: slúžnovský obvod/slúžnovský okres
- German: Stuhlbezirk

A typical county in Hungary is made up of several districts. The headquarters of the districts were usually located in small towns.

=== County head ===
- Royal county: Latin: comes parochialis / comes civitatis / comes comitatus, in later Hungarian: várispán / vármegyei ispán / megyésispán, in later Slovak: hradský špán / župan, in later German: Burggespan / Gespan
- Noble county: Latin: comes, Hungarian: ispán, Slavic languages: župan, German: Gespan

=== Main county head ===
Latin: comes (supremus), Hungarian: főispán, Slovak: hlavný župan, German: Obergespan

=== Deputy county head ===
- Royal county: mentioned as comes castri / castellani by the then Latin sources.
- Noble county and later: Latin: comes curialis / vicecomes, Hungarian: alispán / vicispán, Slovak: podžupan / vicišpán, in German: Untergespan / Vizegespan

=== General Assembly ===
Latin: congregatio generali, Hungarian: közgyűlés, Slovak: generálna kongregácia / stoličné zhromaždenie, German: Komitatsgeneralversammlung

Its decrees and decisions are binding on all county officials. The county regulations were enacted by the county assembly constituted the county's local legislation. The county legislation was subordinate only to the laws of the parliament.

=== Noble judges ===
Latin: iudices nobilium / iudlium, Hungarian (pl) szolgabírák, Slovak (pl) slúžni, German Schöffen / Stuhlrichter (later Stuhlrichter only)

=== Deputy noble judges ===
Latin: viceiudex, Hungarian: alszolgabírák, Slovak: podslúžni, German: Unterstuhlrichter(?).

=== Jurors ===
iurati assessores / iurassores, Hungarian: esküdtek, Slovak: súdni prísažní, German Geschworene

=== Municipal town ===
Hungarian: törvényhatósági jogú város, Slovak: municipálne mesto, German: Munizipalstadt/ Munizipium

== Royal counties (late 10th – late 13th centuries) ==
=== History ===
The Hungarians settled in the Carpathian Basin in 895. The first counties were probably those situated in present-day northern Pannonia (Transdanubia); they arose before or around 1000. The exact time of the creation of many other counties is disputed. Many of them, however, arose not later than the reign of King Stephen I (1000/01–1038). Initially there were also several small frontier counties (Latin: marchiae), established for military purposes only (e.g. comitatus of Bolondus), which however ceased to exist in the 14th century when royal counties were transformed into noble ones. Initially, there were also some small special castle districts, which ceased to exist in the 13th century.

=== Functioning ===
Each county was the responsibility of a county head, whose seat was a castle – a quasi-capital of the county. The county head was the representative of the king, the judge, and the chief law enforcement officer in his respective territory. He collected the taxes and payments in kind made by the subjects to the king, gave two thirds of them to the king, and kept the rest. His castle had special fortifications and was able to withstand even long-term sieges. The sources mention deputy county heads in the 12th century for the first time.

The royal county consisted of castle districts.

== Noble counties (late 13th century – 1848) ==
=== History ===
In the late 13th century, the royal counties gradually turned into highly autonomous noble counties. The reasons for this development were:

- The arrival of new hospites: hospites were foreign settlers who were allowed to apply their own foreign law in their settlements; particularly Germans and especially after 1242. This considerably restricted the real powers of the county heads, since the hospites were outside their jurisdiction.
- At the end of the 12th century, and even more so in the early 13th century under King Andrew II, large parts of royal territory (i. e. of the kingdom) were donated to the so-called "royal servants" (in the 9th–12th centuries members of certain professions, mostly craftsmen, who were settled in special villages and served the king with their respective skills).
- In the 13th century, the royal servants managed to co-ordinate their activities in order to increase their own powers at the expense of those of the county heads (see also the Golden Bull of 1222) and thus became nobles: servientes regis.

As a result, by royal decrees of 1267, 1290, and 1298, the king could only confirm that the royal counties had turned into noble ones. Nobles (mostly former royal servant families) became quasi-rulers in the counties. The change from a royal to a noble county, however, took place at different times in each county.

In the 15th century, the borders of the counties stabilised and basically remained unchanged until 1920. Between the early 16th century and the late 17th century, however, most of the counties ceased to exist once they became part of the Ottoman Empire (the Turks) or of the Principality of Transylvania. After the final defeat of the Turks in 1718, the three southern counties Temesiensis, Torontaliensis and Krassoviensis created the special administrative district Banatus Temesiensis (Temeswar Banate). This district was dissolved again in 1779, but its southernmost part remained part of the Military Frontier (Confiniaria militaria) till the late 19th century.

The bodies of the new counties considerably helped to defend the interests of lower and middle nobility with respect to the oligarchs, who were often the de facto rulers of the kingdom, and with respect to the absolutistic efforts of the Habsburg kings. The counties as noble institutions were abolished only in the course of the Revolution of 1848 by legal articles III–V and XVI/ 1848.

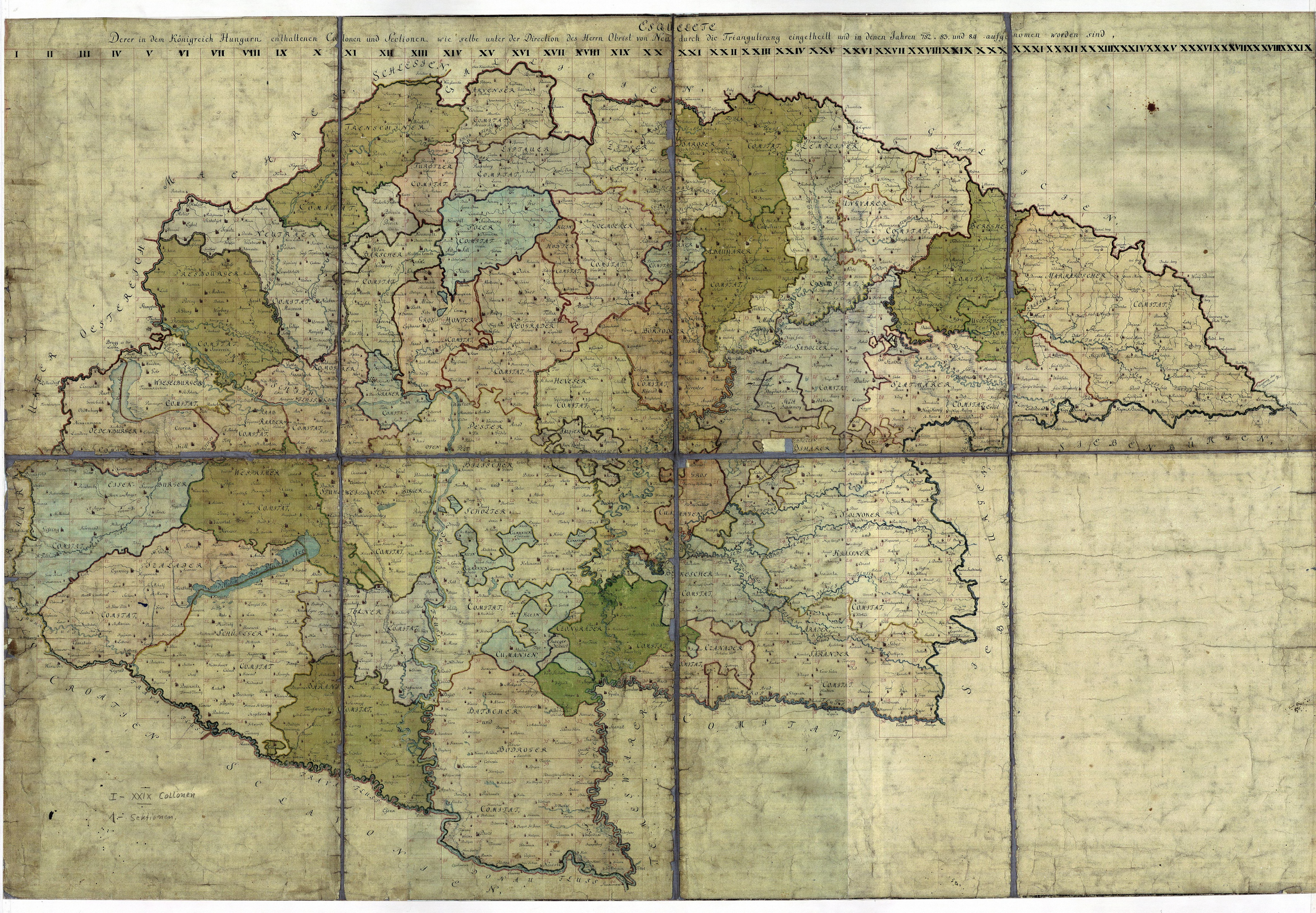
Counties of the Kingdom of Hungary proper (w/o the Grand Principality of Transylvania, Banate of Temeswar, and Croatian-Slavonian Kingdom) between 1782 and 1785 as mapped during the Josephinian Land Survey, right before the Josephinian administrative reform.

==== Temporary centralization (1785–1790) ====
In 1785, king Joseph II decided to abolish the counties as entities of noble autonomy (self-governance) and tried to introduce a new system of absolutist centralized state administration in the Kingdom of Hungary. The kingdom, including Croatia and Slavonia, was primarily divided into 10 newly created military/administrative districts, each of which consisted of four to seven counties. The territory of each county initially corresponded to the traditional one, but in 1786 many of them were merged, and the counties became pure units of state administration: the main county heads were abolished, the county clerks became employees of the state, the courts became the responsibility of the state, etc. The capitals of the districts were chosen to be centrally situated in the district. The number of processus districts was reduced. The official language became German rather than Latin. The districts were headed by a commissioner appointed by the Austrian emperor, who was simultaneously also the king of Hungary. After the death of Emperor Joseph II, however, facing strong resistance against any kind of absolutist centralization in Hungary, the new king Leopold II had to repeal all the reforms, and the old system of the self-government of the counties was reinstated in 1790.

=== Functioning ===
Only the duty to support the king militarily, the territorial unit and formally also the title of county head remained from the former royal counties.

The new county was a self-governing (autonomous) entity of lower gentry. It was led by the county head (comes), appointed by the king, and by his deputy, appointed by the county head. These two persons were the link between the king and the nobility. As a rule, the county heads (from the 15th/16th centuries onwards called main county head) were the supreme feudal lords of the county. From the beginning of the 14th century, the county head was at the same time the castellan of the respective county castle in 13 counties. People became county heads for a limited period of time and could be recalled by the king, but a number of prelates (from the 15th century also seculars) received the "eternal county leadership" of their diocese.

The formal title comes was also borne by some dignitaries of the Court (e. g. comes curiae) and other nobles in the Early Middle Ages, and then by other members of the middle nobility in the Late Middle Ages, and it did not mean count in these cases.

From the 13th–14th centuries onwards, the deputy county heads, and not the county head himself, were the real administrators of the county. The county heads were also higher dignitaries of the state or of the court at the same time (palatine, treasurer, etc.), so that they did not have much time for the management of the county. The deputy county head's role was to administer the county during the county head's absence. Originally, the deputy county head was a personal employee of the king and thus the main person through which the king exercised influence in the county. At the same time, the deputy was the castellan of the castle of the county head or an economic officer (Latin: provisor) of the properties of the same. Initially, the nobles of the county could not influence the appointment of the deputy county head, but in the early 15th century, they managed to put through a rule that only a noble from the same county could become the deputy county head (see below).

Initially, in the 13th century, the influence of nobles made itself felt only in the judicial sphere. The judges of the servientes regis - the so-called iudices servientium - developed into the noble judges (see below), and the courts of the servientes regis - the so-called sedes iudiciaria or sedria - developed into the county court (the Latin name remained sedria). The sedria meetings were led by the county head, later de facto by his deputy (see below). Until the 15th century, the county head's co-judges were his deputy county head, the (usually four) noble judges, and a number of persons appointed ad hoc from among the present nobles. From the 15th century onwards, permanent jurors were elected from among the nobles of the county. The sedria served as the court of first instance for minor disputes of the nobles and as the appeal instance for village courts and patrimonial courts (sedes dominialis).

From the beginning of their existence, the noble judges were the real representatives of county autonomy. They were elected by the congregatio generalis (see below) and were not only judges, but also political administrators of their respective processus districts (see below). They formed the core of the newly arising class of squires.

Later, the counties even turned into political entities, representing the noble autonomy (noble self-government). This evolution started especially under the kings Charles Robert and Louis I. From 1385 onwards, the counties were sending representatives to meetings of the Diet of the Kingdom of Hungary and they played a role in the collection and setting of taxes. But only in the early 15th century, the nobles managed to put through a rule that only a noble from the same county could become the deputy county head and a co-judge. From 1504 onwards the deputy county head's appointment had to be approved by the nobles (congregatio generalis -see below), so that the deputy county head definitively became the de facto leader of the county. The county head, appointed by the king from the oligarchs (supreme nobility), was only the formal representative of the county.

The county authorities were very powerful, and administered all spheres of public life. They were responsible for all inhabitants of the county, except for inhabitants of free royal towns (liberae regiae civitates), mining towns, free districts, and at the time of the Anjou kings also of royal castle domains. Until 1486, some members of the supreme nobility were also exempt from the jurisdiction of the county.

The most important body of self-government of the county was the congregatio generalis, i.e. the county assembly convened and led by the county head. Originally, this body was created and served only as a judicial body, which comprised the judge, the sedria members and 8 elected noble jurors, and which was usually convened once a year. At the same time, the inquisitio communis (hearing of a witness) enabled the nobles to influence the proceedings conducted at the royal curia. Gradually, judicial affairs were excluded from the meetings of the congregatio generalis, which thus turned from a judicial body into an administrative body. All nobles of the county participated in person in the meetings of the congregatio, and the congregatio decided on all important political, military and economic affairs.

As from the beginning of the 15th century, the territory of each county was divided into processus, each of which was administered by one of the noble judges (there were therefore usually four in each county). The aim was to simplify the administration. The number of processus was increasing from the 18th century onwards, because the functions of the counties were increasing too. The processus, in turn, consisted of 2 to 6 "circuits" (Latin: circuli), each of which was the responsibility of a "deputy noble judge".

Until the 1840s (with an exception in 1785–1790), the official language of county administration was Latin.

In 1840, the deputy county head (alispán, Ger. Vicegespann or Vizegespan) was described as "the personage of the most importance in the county", having duties similar to an English sheriff but also presiding over the county court of justice. (The Obergespann, theoretically his superior, was usually a nobleman, who would commonly be in Vienna or Pesth and thus have little time for local affairs.) Furthermore, the Vicegespann presided over the county assembly, which had as late as 1840 a long list of powers, ranging from police regulations to tax, to improvements on bridges and roads.

== State counties (1849–1860) ==
In 1849, in the course of and after the defeat of the Magyars in the 1848-1849 Revolution, the Austrian Habsburgs established a military dictatorship in the Kingdom of Hungary and the counties were turned into simple state administration entities and authorities.

=== 1st provisional arrangement (1849–1850) ===
A provisional centralised administration started to be created by the Austrians in February 1849, Alexander Bach issued a decree on provisional organisation of the Kingdom of Hungary in early August 1849 and a regulation on the administrative system of the Kingdom of Hungary followed on October 24. Under this regulation:

- Croatia-Slavonia, the Military frontier, Voivodina and the Temes-Banate were separated from the Kingdom of Hungary (which did not include Transylvania at that time) and directly subordinated to Vienna
- the remaining territory of the Kingdom of Hungary was divided into 5 military districts (in present-day Slovakia: Bratislava, Košice, in the remaining territory: Sopron, Pest-Buda, Oradea) led by generals appointed by the emperor, which in turn were divided into civil districts (around 4 in each military district), the civil districts were divided into counties (with their previous borders) and the counties into districts. German became the official language.

=== 2nd provisional arrangement (so-called Geringer Provisional Arrangement; September 13, 1850 – January 18, 1853) ===
Under a regulation on provisional political administration of the Kingdom of Hungary issued on September 13, 1850, the territory was divided into the above 5 districts (called civil districts now), which in turn consisted of counties and the counties of districts. The territories of some counties changed, some counties were newly created. The districts were led by main district county heads, the counties by a chairman (German:Vorstand) and the districts by noble judges (German: Stuhlrichter).

=== "Definitive" arrangement (January 19, 1853 – October 20, 1860) ===
Only slight changes were made to the previous arrangement. Each district was formally turned to an administrative territory of a governorship department (since July 1, 1860: administrative territory of the branche-offices of the governorship). Some county territories were slightly modified and they were led by commissioners. The only responsibilities of these state counties were political administration and the management of taxes. The courts were the responsibility of other entities.

== Transitory period (1860–1867) ==
The situation prevailing before 1848 was restored in October 1860, both in terms of borders and in terms of noble autonomy. In 1863, however, the noble autonomy was replaced by an absolutist system of state administration again.

== Modernised counties (1867–1920) ==
=== History ===
After the Austro-Hungarian Compromise of 1867, in 1868 Transylvania was definitively reunited with the Kingdom of Hungary proper, and the town and district of Rijeka declared autonomous. In 1869, the counties lost the jurisdiction powers (the courts) as royal courts were organized. Modernization of the counties was then realized in two steps.

First, an 1870 act of parliament unified the legal status and internal administrative structures of the various municipal (self-governing) administrative units, abolishing almost all historical privileges. However, this Municipalities Act retained the historical names and officials of the municipalities and did not touch their territories in general, so the territory and names of the counties still largely corresponded to those of the pre-1848 period. However, in addition to the 65 counties (49 in Hungary proper, 8 in Transylvania, and 8 in Croatia), there were 89 cities with municipal rights, including historical royal privileged towns and others, authorised by the 1870 Act, and other types of territorial municipalities (3 in Hungary proper and 18 in Transylvania), including privileged districts, the so-called seats of the Székely Land and Transylvanian Saxons and others. Thus, the total number of municipal entities was 175 under direct control of the central Hungarian government, of which about a third was a county.

The main effect of the 1870 Municipalities Act was that it was no longer only the nobles and other privileged groups who could lead the municipalities (see Functioning). The system of districts (historically, in Latin, processus) as administrative sub-divisions was affirmed in counties and extended to other areas.

The second step of modernization was realized in another act of parliament in 1876. This Municipal Territories Act reduced the number of municipalities significantly and made counties the only territorial units by abolishing privileged districts, seats and other forms. 73 counties were organized in place of the 65 counties and 21 other units. However, historical identities were highly considered; in Hungary proper only minor corrections were made. Bigger changes came to Transylvania where the Székely Land and the Saxons' Land were completely "countified". At the same time the total number of municipal towns was reduced from 89 to 30.

After 1876 only minor changes were made to the system until 1918. The number of processus districts steadily increased over the next decades, growing from around 400 up to some 450 by 1918. The powers and responsibilities of the counties were constantly decreased and were transferred to ministries in different fields of special administration, like responsibilities in terms of construction, veterinary medicine and (overall) financial management. The ministries controlled these through their own regional and local agencies.

=== Functioning ===
The main county body was the municipal committee, comprising 50% virilists (persons paying the highest direct taxes), and 50% elected persons fulfilling the prescribed census and ex officio members (deputy county head, main notary and others). The county was led by the main county head, who was a government official subordinated to the Ministry of the Interior of the Kingdom of Hungary. The deputy county head was also an important function.

== See also ==
- Regions of Hungary
- Counties of Hungary
- Districts of Hungary (from 2013)
  - Subregions of Hungary (until 2013)
- Administrative divisions of the Kingdom of Hungary (until 1920)
  - Demographics of the Kingdom of Hungary by county
- Administrative divisions of the Kingdom of Hungary (1941–45)
- List of cities and towns of Hungary
- NUTS:HU
