= Eastern Slovak dialects =

Group of dialects of Slovak

Eastern Slovak
- východoslovenské nárečia, východniarčina
- Native to: Slovakia
- Region: Spiš, Šariš, Zemplín and Abov
- Language family: Indo-European: Balto-Slavic; Slavic; West Slavic; Czech–Slovak; Slovak; Eastern Slovak
- Dialects: Pannonian Rusyn; Šariš; Spiš; Zemplín; Abov

Language codes
- ISO 639-3: –
- Linguist List: slk-esl
- Glottolog: None
- Eastern Slovak is classified as Vulnerable by the UNESCO Atlas of the World's Languages in Danger.

Eastern Slovak dialects (Slovak: východoslovenské nárečia, východniarčina) are dialects of the Slovak language spoken natively in the historical regions of Spiš, Šariš, Zemplín and Abov, in the east of Slovakia. In contrast to other dialects of Slovak, Eastern dialects are less intelligible with Czech and more with Polish and Rusyn.

Features of the dialects vary greatly from region to region, but features that are common throughout all dialects include the lack of long vowels, stress on the penultimate syllable, as in Polish and Rusyn, as opposed to the first syllable stress normal in standard Slovak, and variation in noun declension endings. Eastern Slovak dialects also share many features of Western Slovak dialects that are absent from Central dialects and standard Slovak, supporting the idea that Central Slovakia was settled more recently than the east and west of the country.

Attempts to create an East Slovak literary standard have been varied and unsuccessful. Several Slovak newspapers founded in the United States in the late 19th century, including Slovák v Amerike ("Slovak in America") and Amerikánsko-Slovenské Noviny (The American-Slovak News), were initially written in Eastern Slovak dialects.

== History ==
The standard Slovak language, as codified by Ľudovít Štúr in the 1840s, was based largely on Central Slovak dialects spoken at the time. Eastern dialects are considerably different from Central and Western dialects in their phonology, morphology and vocabulary, set apart by a stronger connection to Polish and Rusyn. At the beginning of the 20th century, there was an unsuccessful attempt to standardise an East Slovak language.

Diaspora from the region has contributed to a scattered literary presence of Eastern Slovak dialects. The newspaper Slovák v Amerike ("The Slovak in America"), founded in Plymouth, Massachusetts, in 1889, as well as Amerikánsko-Slovenské noviny (American-Slovak News), founded in Pittsburgh, Pennsylvania, in 1886, were originally written in the Šariš dialect, using Hungarian orthography, titled Szlovjak v Amerike and Amerikanszko-Szlovenszke Novini. Today, Slovák v Amerike is still in business and writes in standard Slovak.

== Division ==
Eastern Slovak dialects can be divided into four subgroups:

- Spiš dialects (spišské nárečia, spiština), to the east of the town of Poprad, which border with Rusyn and the Polish Goral dialects.
- Šariš dialects (šarišské nárečia, šariština), spoken around the city of Prešov, and sharing many features in common with Zemplín and Rusyn.
- Abov dialects (abovské nárečia), including the Košice dialect (košické nárečia), spoken in south-western eastern Slovakia and sharing several phonological features with Hungarian and Zemplín.
- Zemplín dialects (zemplínské nárečia), spoken in the far south and central eastern Slovakia, which form the transition between Slovak, Šariš and Rusyn.

In addition, most scholars now view Pannonian Rusyn as an East Slovak dialect with features from the Šariš and Zemplín dialects.

== Linguistic features ==
Linguistic features common to East Slovak dialects include:

- Word stress falls on the penultimate syllable, not the first.
- Vowel length is not distinguished - all vowels are short.
- Consonants n, l, s and z always realised as softened ň, ľ, š and ž before i, and sometimes also before e, often assimilating diphthongs (menia > meňa, chvália > chvaľa, siví > šivi, vozia > voža). Until the 14th century, an even wider array of soft (palatalised) consonants existed in Slovak, and this feature can still be heard in some Zemplín dialects.
- Consonants ť and ď, including t and d when softened, realised as c and dz (deti > dzeci), meaning the infinitive ending for verbs changes from -ť (robiť) to -c (robic). The consonants ť and ď can only be found in onomatopoeia (ďub ďub = the cooing of a pigeon), and loanwords including personal names (Juraj > Ďura) in Eastern dialects. In Pannonian Rusyn, ť and ď may also become č and dž in certain cases, such as tiecť > чечиц (čečic), or hadica > гаджица (hadžica). In some cases (but not all), sť or šť may yield šč, such as pustiť > пущиц (puščic); elsewise, especially word-finally and before E, sc is more common: masc, vlasc, oblasc, etc.
- Syllabic l and r are always complemented by a vowel in Eastern dialects. The tone and position of the vowel greatly varies from region to region. The word slza (tear) can be soldza, sliza, silza or selza. The lack of syllabic consonants is also shared by other dialects of northern Slovakia and southern Poland and the Lach dialects of Czech.
- Especially in Abov dialects, ch is always realised as h (mucha > muha).
- Noun declension is different from in standard Slovak. The genitive and locative plurals are always -och, regardless of gender, and the dative plural is always -om. (bratov > bratoch, žien > ženoch, miest > mestoch, ženám > ženom). V Košiciach ("in Košice") becomes v Košicoch, except in the Košice dialect, which treats the city's name as a singular noun and uses v Košici.
- The letter ä is realised as e (deväť > dzevec). Accusative personal pronouns ending in -a also end in -e; ma, ťa, sa become me, ce, še.

== Example text ==
Eastern Slovak (Šariš dialect)

Buľi raz dvojo kmotrove, co furt vjedno chodziľi na jurmaki. Raz tiž tak išľi z jurmaku a našľi gvera. Ta znace, že ešči ftedi ľudze tak ňechirovali o gveroch, ňebulo teľo vojakoch. Išľi tak popod ľešik a naraz jeden zbačil gver a takoj ku ňemu ucekal… Ten druhi še tiž mocno zradoval, ta vžaľi totu fujaru a hutorili sebe: "Kmotre, ja budzem do ňej duc a ti budzeš prebirac". Ta začaľi vera ľudze tote dvomi hrac. Jeden kmoter pocahnul za kohucik, kuľka utrafila do druheho kmotra, co prebiral a ten še takoj prevracil umarti na žem.

Standard Slovak

Boli raz dvaja kmotrovia, ktorí stále spolu chodili na jarmoky. Raz tiež tak vyšli z jarmoku a našli pušku. To viete, že vtedy ešte ľudia tak nechyrovali o puškách, nebolo toľko vojakov. Išli tak popod lesík a jeden zazrel pušku a hneď k nej utekal. Ten druhý sa tiež silno zaradoval, tak vzali fujaru a hovorili si: „Kmotor, ja budem do nej fúkať a ty budeš preberať„. Tak začali veru tí dvaja hrať. Jeden kmotor potiahol za kohútik, guľka trafila druhého kmotra, ktorý preberal, a ten sa hneď prevrátil mŕtvy na zem.
