= Modra (disambiguation) =

Modra is a city and municipality in Slovakia.

Modra may also refer to:

== Places ==
- Modra (Bithynia), a town of ancient Bithynia
- Modra, Sanski Most, a village in Bosnia and Herzegovina
- Modrá, a municipality and village in the Czech Republic
- 11118 Modra, an asteroid

== People ==
- Modra (surname)

== Other uses ==
- Modra, Anglo-Saxon supernatural figures - see List of Anglo-Saxon deities
- Modra (film), a 2010 Canadian drama
