= Modern Ruthenian =

Modern Ruthenian may refer to the following languages:

- Rusyn language, or Carpatho-Ruthenian, spoken in Carpathian Ruthenia
- Pannonian Rusyn, or Pannonian-Ruthenian, spoken in Bačka and Syrmia, and an official language of Vojvodina
