= Pannonian Rusyn =

Eastern Slovak dialect spoken by Pannonian Rusyns

- Yugoslav Rusyn
- руски язик ruski jazik
- Native to: Serbia; Croatia
- Ethnicity: Pannonian Rusyns
- Native speakers: c. 5,000-10,000 (2022 census)
- Language family: Indo-European: Balto-Slavic; Slavic; West Slavic; Czech–Slovak; Slovak; Eastern Slovak; Pannonian Rusyn
- Early forms: Proto-Indo-European: Proto-Balto-Slavic; Proto-Slavic; Old Slovak
- Writing system: Cyrillic (Pannonian Rusyn alphabet)

Official status
- Official language in: Serbia (in Vojvodina)
- Recognised minority language in: Croatia (in Petrovci and Mikluševci)
- Regulated by: Statute of Vojvodina

Language codes
- ISO 639-3: rsk
- Glottolog: pann1240

Pannonian Rusyn (руски язик, romanized: ruski jazik), also historically referred to as Yugoslav Rusyn, is a variety of the Rusyn language, spoken by the Pannonian Rusyns, primarily in the regions of Vojvodina (northern part of modern Serbia) and Slavonia (eastern part of modern Croatia), and also in the Pannonian Rusyn diaspora in the United States and Canada. Since Rusyns are officially recognized as a national minority both in Serbia and Croatia, their language is also recognized as a minority language, and in the provincial administration of Serbian province of Vojvodina is employed as one of six languages in official use.

There are several scholarly debates on various linguistic issues related to this language, including the question of whether Pannonian Rusyn should be reclassified as a distinct microlanguage, a dialect of Eastern Slovak, or still considered to be just a specific variety of the common Rusyn language, which also has other varieties, spoken by Rusyns in northern (Carpathian) regions, mainly in southwestern Ukraine, northeastern Slovakia, southeastern Poland, and northern Romania.

== Name ==
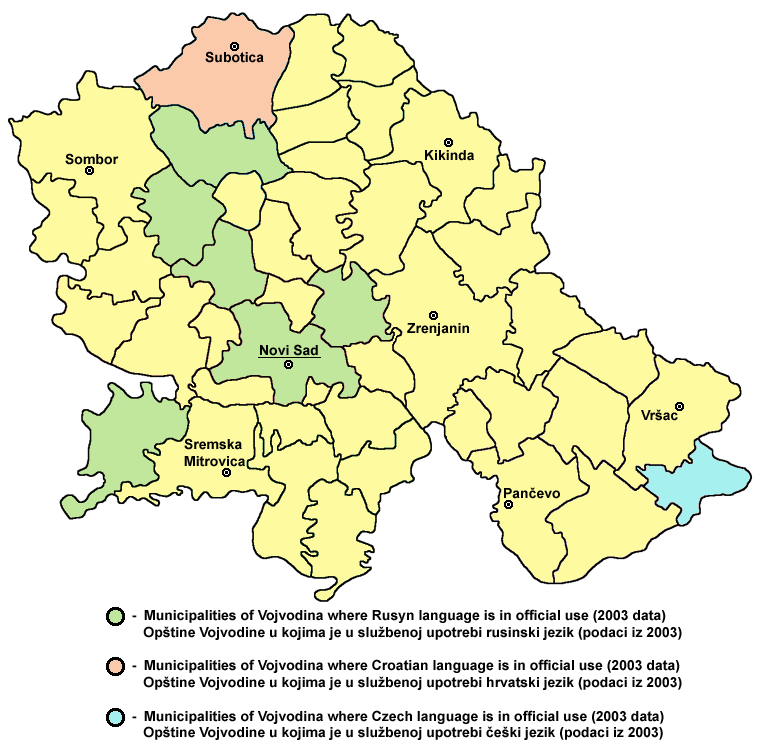
Languages in official use (besides Serbian) in Serbian province of Vojvodina (municipalities shown in green where Pannonian Rusyn is in official use)

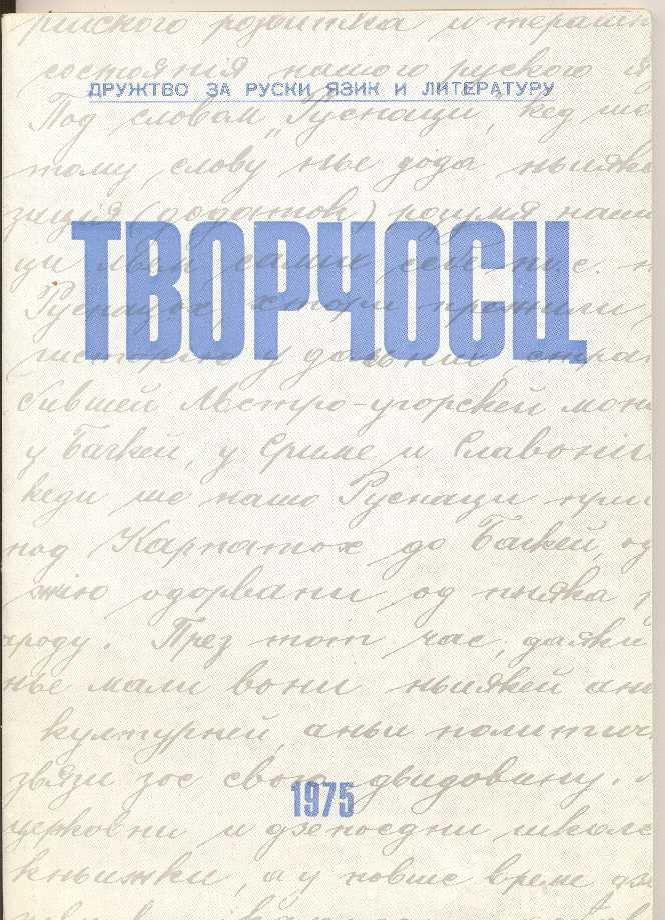
Pannonian Rusyn journal Creativity (Pannonian Rusyn: Творчосц), no. 1 (1975)

In some non-Slavic languages, Pannonian Rusyns may be referred to by somewhat archaic exonyms, such as Pannonian Ruthenes or Pannonian Ruthenians, and their language is thus labeled as Pannonian Ruthenian, but such terminology is not used in the native (Rusyn) language. Ruthenian exonyms are also viewed as imprecise, since they have several broader meanings, both in terms of their historical uses and ethnic scopes, that are encompassing various East Slavic groups and their languages. In English, Pannonian Rusyns generally refer to their language as simply "Ruthenian"; for instance, there exists a "Department of Ruthenian Studies" at the Faculty of Philosophy in the University of Novi Sad, which teaches courses relating to Pannonian Rusyn.

Most commonly, native speakers refer to their language simply as Rusky (Pannonian Rusyn: руски язик, romanized: rusky iazik), that renders in English as Rusyn. Sometimes they also use the somewhat archaic term Rusnacky (Pannonian Rusyn: руснацки язик, romanized: rusnatsky jazyk), that renders in English as Rusnak. These terms are used both by laypersons in daily conversation, and by Pannonian-Rusyn linguists in native-language scholarly works.

Since those terms have historically been (and still are) used by Carpathian Rusyns and other East Slavs as endonyms for their own vernacular, a need emerged for an appropriate adjective to identify this particular linguistic variety. In this spirit, Gabriel Kostelnik proposed the term Bačvansko-Rusky (Pannonian Rusyn: бачваньско-руски язик, lit. 'Bačka Rusyn') to refer to the language spoken in the region of Bačka (modern-day Serbia).

Eventually, the more general term, Bačka-Syrmia (Pannonian Rusyn: бачваньско-сримски), was adopted by several scholars and thus also encompassed the varieties of the language spoken in the region of Syrmia (modern-day Serbia and Croatia). Terms such as Vojvodina Rusyn or Vojvodinian Rusyn were alternatively used to refer to all variants in the region of Vojvodina. Even wider term Yugoslav Rusyn was sometimes also used during the existence of former Yugoslavia.

Finally, during the 1970s and 1980s, Rusyn writer and artist Yulian Kolyesarov proposed the term Panonsko-Rusky (Pannonian Rusyn: панонско-руски язик) or Pannonian Rusyn.

In spite of all the aforementioned endonymic tems, some modern authors still opt to use those based on the exonymic term Ruthenian. Since native speakers do not use Ruthenian or related terms for self-identification in their own language, such terms are likewise not used in works written in the native language. Still, the terms are employed by some authors in various English-language and non-Slavic works; sometimes in a very general manner. For instance, instead of using regional identifiers (such as Pannonian Ruthenian, corresponding to Pannonian Rusyn), several of these authors have begun to simply designate that linguistic variety solely as Ruthenian, excluding any regional or other adjectives.

Thus, a peculiar terminological situation has emerged as the term Ruthenian language already has a specific and well-established meaning in both traditional and scientific contexts and primarily refers to late medieval and early modern varieties of East Slavic as were spoken in the regions of modern-day Ukraine, Belarus from the 15th until 18th centuries. More recently in the former Austro-Hungarian Monarchy, the corresponding term (German: ruthenische Sprache) was employed until 1918 as the official exonymic term for the entire body of East Slavic languages within the borders of the Monarchy.

=== ISO 639-3 Identifier ===
In 2022, the ISO 639-3 identifier, rsk, and language names, Rusyn and Ruthenian, were approved for Pannonian Rusyn by ISO. The change followed request in 2020 by a group of linguists (including Aleksandr Dulichenko) in which ISO was asked to recognize Pannonian Rusyn as distinct and separate from Carpathian Rusyn and to issue it the new ISO 639-3 identifier, Ruthenian language (with the additional name, Rusnak).

This ISO update is the latest development since a 2019 proposal from a smaller group of those same linguists which similarly requested suppression of the code, rue, and division of Rusyn language into two distinct languages: the East Rusyn language (Carpathian Rusyn) and the South Rusyn language (Pannonian Rusyn). However, in 2020, ISO authorities rejected the request.

As explained earlier, term Ruthenian language already has a specific and well-established meaning. However, the additional term, Rusnak, also has a wider connotation as it is a traditional endonym for all Rusyns (whether in Pannonia or Carpathian Rus'). The effects of the adoption of these terms for Pannonian Rusyn by ISO (if any) remain to be seen.

== Classification ==
Pannonian Rusyn has recently been treated as a separate language from Carpatho-Rusyn. By some scholars, mainly American scholars, Pannonian Rusyn has been treated as a West Slavic language, and Carpatho-Rusyn as an East Slavic language, which would make Pannonian Rusyn the only West Slavic language to use the Cyrillic script.

In the ISO 639-9 identifier application for Pannonian Rusyn (or "Ruthenian" as it is referred to in that document), the authors note that "Ruthenian is closest to [a] linguistic entity sometimes called [Slovak: východniarsky; Pan. Rusyn: виходнярски, lit. 'East Slovak'], (Note: Original text: "Vchodnoslovensky [sic] (віходняски)") ... (the speeches of Trebišov and Prešov [districts])."

Though Pannonian Rusyn shares most of its linguistic features with these Eastern Slovak dialects, it shares nine features which are exclusive to South-West Zemplin (Trebišov) Eastern Slovak varieties:

- Reflexes *ĕ (e.g. сушед, sušed, 'neighbor'; хлєб, chljeb, 'bread'; шедзиц, šedzic, 'sit');
- Reflexes *ḷ (e.g. полни, polni, 'full'; волна, volna, 'wool'; жолти, žolti, 'yellow');
- Distribution o < *ō/*ŏ (e.g. вол, vol, 'ox'; мой, moj, 'my'; ровни, rovni, 'flat');
- The distribution of e < *ē/*ě (e.g. корень, koren', 'root'; седем, sedem, 'seven'; зберац, zberac, 'collect');
- Change of *s > š/ш and *z > ž/ж and the absence of phonemes ś and ź (e.g. шестра, šestra, 'sister'; єшень, ješen', 'fall'; желєни, željeni, 'green');
- The presence of hard consonant groups šč/щ and ždž/ждж (e.g. щесце, ščesce, 'happiness'; щири, ščiri, 'honest'; гвижджиц, hviždžic, 'whistle');
- The dative and the locative singular forms of feminine nouns with the ending -a in the nominative singular form (e.g. о мухи, o muchi, 'about fly'; у миски, u miski, 'in dish'; на драги, na drahi, 'on road');
- Infinitive endings and final -čic/-чиц (печиц, pečic, 'bake'; чечиц, čečic, 'flow');
- Lexical elements (e.g. мац, mac, 'mother'; kukovka/куковка "cuckoo", тидзень, tidzen', 'week'; цо, co, 'what').

Pannonian Rusyn also shares three features unique to South-East Šariš (Prešov) Eastern Slоvаk varieties:

- The presence of certain forms of the auxiliary verb буц, buc, 'be' (e.g. сом, som, 'am'; ши, ši, 'are'; etc.) and the formation of negative forms (e.g. нє сом, nje som, 'am not'; нє є, nje je, 'is not'; etc.);
- Formation of masculine singular participle with the formant -l/-л for the verbs having the infinitive base in consonant (e.g. плєтол, pljetol, 'he knitted' везол, vezol, 'he drove') and forms in the final -nul/-нул (e.g. спаднул, spadnul, 'he fell'; шеднул, šednul, 'he sat');
- Lexical elements (e.g. угел, uhel, 'corner'; гумно, humno, 'yard').

Dulichenko аlsо states that East Slovak features predominate both on phonological and morphological level. He points to the following phonological features:

- Stress in Ruthenian is always on penultimate syllable; Dulichenko connects this feature with Polish, although it is present in all Eastern Slovak speeches;
- Initial e > je/є (e.g. єден, jeden, 'one'; єшень, ješen', 'fall'; єлень, jelen', 'deer');
- *i, *y > i/и (e.g. мили, mili, 'dear'; штири, štiri, 'four'; мидло, midlo, 'soap'; дим, dim, 'smoke') as in Slovak and Czech, while East Slavic languages and dialects rigorously differentiate between *i and *y, with most Carpathian Rusyn varieties even differentiating a third ŷ;
- dj > dz (e.g. цудзи, cudzi, 'foreign'; садза, sadza, 'soot'; одредзиц, odredzic, 'determine'); tj > c (e.g. вецей, vecej, 'more'; ноц, noc, 'night'; моц, moc, 'power');
- z' > (ź) > ž/ж (e.g. жвир, žvir, 'beast'; жридло, žridlo, 'spring'; бояжлїви, bojažljivi, 'afraid'); s' > (ś) > š/ш (e.g. шено, šeno, 'hay'; шестра, šestra, 'sister'; дзешец, dzešec, 'ten');
- The Proto-Slavic consonant groups *dl and *tl are preserved (e.g. зубадло, zubadlo, '(artificial) teeth'; ковадло, kovadlo, 'anvil'; садло, sadlo, 'lard'; стретла, stretla, 'she met');
- gvi > hvi (e.g. гвизда, hvizda, 'star'; гвиздац, hvizdac, 'whistle'); kvi > kvi (e.g. квице, kvice, 'flower'; квитнуц, kvitnuc, 'bloom');
- Absence of epenthesis l'/л (е.g. зарабяц, zarabjac, 'earn'; охабяц, ochabjac, 'leave'; любени, ljubeni, 'loved').
- Proto-Slavic groups -ort and -olt became groups rot- and lot- (e.g. локец, lokec, 'elbow'; ровни, rovni, 'flat'; роснуц, rosnuc, 'grow');
- The below Proto-Slavic groups changed in the same manner as in West and South Slavic languages. In contrast, these groups became torot, tolot, teret, tolot (e.g. boroda, poroch, korova; holova, boloto, holod; bereh, pered, vereteno; moloko, polot', polova) in East Slavic languages.
  - tort became trat (e.g. брада, brada, 'beard'; прах, prach, 'dust'; крава, krava, 'cow');
  - tolt became tlat (e.g. глава, hlava, 'head'; блато, blato, 'mud'; злато, zlato, 'gold');
  - tert became tret (e.g. брег, breh, 'hill'; пред, pred, 'before'; вреценко, vrecenko, 'spindle');
  - telt became tlet (e.g. млєко, mljeko, 'milk'; плєц, pljec, 'weed'; плєва, pljeva, 'chaff').

Dulichenko also notes that Pannonian Rusyn shares the following morphological features with East Slovak dialects:

- The nominative singular of nouns of neuter gender on a soft stem is formed by the ending -o (e.g. морйо, morjo, 'sea'; шерцо, šerco, 'heart'; польо, pol'o, 'field'), while East Slavic and standard Slovak generally use -e;
- The instrumental singular of nouns of feminine gender is formed by the ending -u/-у (e.g. з мацеру, z maceru, 'with mother'; над воду, nad vodu, 'above water'), whereas standard Slovak employs -ou;
- The genitive plural and locative plural (vocative plural for nouns pertaining to animate thing) of nouns are formed by the ending -och/-ох (e.g. [шпив] птицох, [špiv] pticoch, '[singing] of birds', [брех] псох, [brech] psoch, '[barking] of dogs', до очох, do očoch, 'to the eyes');
- The dative plural of nouns formed by the ending -om/-ом (e.g. ґу брадлом, gu bradlom, 'to the heaps', вельо щесца нашим дзецом, vel'o ščesca našim dzecom, 'a lot of luck to our children');
- The instrumental plural ending: a) of adjectives (e.g.з добрима дзецми, z dobrima dzecmi, 'with good children'; з тлустима женами, z tlustima ženami, 'with fat women'); b) of possessive, interrogative, demonstrative and personal pronouns of the third person plural (e.g. з моїма шестрами, z mojima šestrami, 'with my sisters'; пред котрима, pred kotrima, 'in front of which'; з нїма, z njima, 'with them');
- The nominative plural ending -o a) of possessive pronouns (e.g.мойо кнїжки, mojo knjižki, 'my books'); b) of possessive adjectives (e.g. шестрино хусточки, šestrino chustočki, 'sister's kerchiefs');
- The ending -m/-м for the first person singular of the Present Tense (e.g. я шпивам, ja špivam, 'I sing'; я идзем, ja idzem, 'I go'; я читам, ja čitam, 'I read');
- The ending -me/-ме for the first person plural of the Present Tense (e.g. ми нєшеме, mi nješeme, 'we carry'; ми пишеме, mi pišeme, 'we write'; ми читаме, mi čitame, 'we read');
- The endings -a, -ja, -u, -ju/-а, -я, -у, -ю for the third person plural of the Present Tense (e.g. вони правя, voni pravja, 'they make'; вони глєдаю, voni hljedaju, 'they search');
- The reflexive particle še/ше is weakly related to a verb and can proceed it (e.g. я ше нє мишам з таким шветом, ja še nje mišam z takim švetom, 'I do not mix with people like that');
- The system of forms of the auxiliary verb buc (som, ši, je, zme, sce, su)/буц (сом, ши, є, зме, сце, су);
- The conjunction že/же in the dependent clause (e.g. я знам же …, ja znam že …, 'I know that …').

=== Classification as West Slavic ===
Pannonian Rusyn and Carpathian Rusyn are claimed by some scholars to both be East Slavic languages. Pannonian Rusyn differs from Carpathian Rusyn in that the former has been influenced by the surrounding South Slavic languages (especially Serbian), whilst the latter has been influenced by the surrounding West Slavic languages (especially Polish and Slovak).

Among the West Slavic languages, Pannonian Rusyn has been especially influenced by the Eastern Slovak dialects. This influence occurred before the Rusyns emigrated to Pannonia from the northern Carpathian region, around the middle of the 18th century.

More recently, Pannonian Rusyn has been claimed, even by linguists and grammarians of Pannonian Rusyn origin, to be an inherit from Old Slovak, with extraneous East Slavic influence being derived from historically geographically proximate Carpathian Rusyn. This largely manifests in vocabulary, for example words displaying -дї- and -тї-.

In turn, Carpathian Rusyn has also been influenced by pre-migration Pannonian Rusyn, albeit to a smaller degree; for instance, the word for "spear" is копія, a feminine noun borrowed from Pannonian Rusyn копия, inherited from Old Slovak kopija. A native East Slavic inherit would have yielded a neuter noun; compare Russian копьё.

Yet another theory, supported and proposed by Slavic linguists such as Aleksandr Dulichenko, claims that Pannonian Rusyn is a microlanguage, albeit one that cannot be neatly classified as the descendant of any one larger Slavic literary language, due to the interweaving of West Slavic and East Slavic features (both grammatically and lexically), further combined with partial South Slavic (chiefly Serbo-Croatian) influence in the last two centuries.

== Phonology ==
=== Consonants ===
		Labial	Dental/ Alveolar		Post- alveolar		Velar	Glottal
		Labial	hard	soft	hard	soft	Velar	Glottal
Nasal		m	n	ɲ				
Stop	voiceless	p	t	c			k	
Stop	voiced	b	d	ɟ			ɡ	
Affricate	voiceless		t͡s (Note: May be geminated if preceded by [d] or [t].)		t͡ʃ			
Affricate	voiced		d͡z		d͡ʒ			
Fricative	voiceless	f	s		ʃ		x	ɦ
Fricative	voiced	v	z		ʒ			
Rhotic			r					
Approximant	lateral		l	ʎ				
Approximant	median	(w) (Note: The [w] sound only exists within alteration of [v], specifically when [v] follows a vowel and is either word-end or followed by another consonant that is not [j]. For instance, вовк is pronounced [vɔwk] rather than, say, [vɔfk].)				j		

- Any consonant may be geminated when spelt twice. For example, койяк (kojjak) is pronounced [ˈkɔjːak] rather than [ˈkɔjak]. However, this almost exclusively occurs in compound words, as native words are generally respelled to reduce repeated letters into one letter.
- In certain Rusyn-speaking regions, particularly in Petrovci, [t͡ʃ] and [d͡ʒ] uniformly merge with [c] and [ɟ] in speech, i.e. дж and ч merge with дь and ть, although this merger is not reflected in spelling.

=== Vowels ===
	Front	Central	Back
Close	i		u
Mid	ɛ		ɔ
Open		a	

Unlike standard Slovak or Czech, there is no vowel length distinction. There is also very little (if any) vowel reduction, and [i] is almost never realized as [ɪ], although [a] may sometimes be realized as [ə] in certain words due to Serbian influence, such as нє знам (nje znam, "I don't know") being pronounced as [ˈɲɛ‿znəm] by certain speakers in colloquial speech.

Another notable difference to other West Slavic languages and to Western East Slavic languages is that there is no shift involved with the vowel ⟨ó⟩. Czech notably uses ⟨ů⟩ to denote [uː] which had historically evolved from ⟨ó⟩, while Slovak and Polish use ⟨ô⟩ [uo] and ⟨ó⟩ [u] respectively to represent their respective vowel shifts. In the Ukrainian language, Proto-Slavic *o shifts to ⟨і⟩ under certain circumstances, while in Carpathian Rusyn, it may manifest as ⟨і⟩, ⟨ӱ⟩, or ⟨у⟩ depending on the dialect. However, such a shift is not present in Pannonian Rusyn.

This can be illustrated using the word for "horse" (Proto-Slavic *koňь), which is kůň in Czech, kôň in Slovak, кінь (kin') in Ukrainian, and кӱнь (kün') in Carpathian Rusyn. However, in Pannonian Rusyn, the term is конь (kon'), as in Belarusian or Russian, with no vowel shift compared to the Proto-Slavic form.

=== Prosody ===
Pannonian Rusyn, for the vast majority of words, has penultimate stress, that is, the second-to-last syllable is stressed for every word with two or more syllables. For example, товариш (tovariš, "friend") is pronounced [tɔˈvariʃ], while its dative and locative form, товаришови (tovarišovi) is pronounced [tɔvariˈʃɔvi].

The main systematic exception is words ending in -изм (-izm, "-ism"), which are considered to have a syllabic ⟨м⟩ and thus pronounced [ˈizm̩]. The syllabicity of the ending is lost in oblique forms which append a vowel to the word, thus retaining stress as [ˈizm-]. However, due to influence from Serbo-Croatian -изам / -izam, -ism type nouns are often spelt with -изем (-izem) in the nominative singular, which also retains stress on [ˈiz-].

Another exception is words which end in the indefinite suffix -шик (-šik). For those words, the stressed syllable is the same one as in the pronoun without this suffix, that is, despite the vowel, this suffix is not taken into account when considering penultimate stress. For instance, хторишик (xtorišik, "some, any") is pronounced [ˈxtɔriʃik] rather than [xtɔˈriʃik] which would have otherwise been derived according to the rule of penultimate stress.

For a minority of words, they may have irregular stress, which is usually indicated in dictionaries with an acute accent. These tend to be interjections, and examples of this include акура́т (akurát [akuˈrat], "exactly!"), ба́яко (bájako [ˈbajakɔ], "of course not!") and ни-а́ (ni-á [niˈa], "look...").

When a monosyllabic preposition or the term нє (nje, "not") precedes a monosyllabic word, the stress of the two words are taken collectively, and lands on the former word, for instance до нас (do nas, "to us") is pronounced [ˈdɔ‿nas] instead of [dɔ‿ˈnas], which may be indicated in dictionaries as до́ нас.

=== Voicing and devoicing ===
Pannonian Rusyn consonants display voicing and devoicing, depending on their position in a word or surrounding words.

At the end of a word, voiced consonants are devoiced, for example раз (raz, "time") is pronounced [ras] rather than [raz]. This phenomenon also occurs in many other Slavic languages, such as Russian or Polish. However, final devoicing does not occur when the word is followed by a word which begins with a voiced consonant or a vowel; instead, unvoiced consonants are voiced, for instance брат и шестра (brat i šestra, "brother and sister") being pronounced as [brad‿i‿ˈʃɛstra] rather than [brat‿i‿ˈʃɛstra].

In a consonant cluster, whether a consonant is voiced or not depends on the final consonant in the cluster. This affects whether the consonant(s) before it are voiced. For instance, in the word дробизґ (drobizg, "poultry"), since the final consonant is devoiced to [k], the preceding consonant is also subsequently devoiced to [s], thus giving [ˈdrɔbisk] as the final pronunciation. Likewise, in the word французки (francuzki, "French"), since ⟨к⟩ is unvoiced, it affects the preceding ⟨з⟩ and devoices it to [s], therefore giving [franˈt͡suski] as the pronunciation, and also implying that -зки (-zki) and -ски (-ski) are essentially homophonic.

As mentioned earlier, one consonant which is rarely devoiced is ⟨в⟩ [v] — it is only devoiced to [f] when followed by an unvoiced consonant word-initially, such as in the word вше (vše, "always") [fʃɛ]. Elsewhere in a word, ⟨в⟩ either retains [v] if followed by a vowel, or it is realized as [u̯ ~ w] word-finally or before a consonant, akin to in Ukrainian and Slovak. The exception to this is if the word is a compound term, consisting of a latter component which begins with ⟨в⟩ and another consonant, for instance привреда (privreda, "economy", ultimately from Serbo-Croatian pri- + vrediti) being pronounced [priˈvrɛda] instead of [priu̯ˈrɛda]. [v] may also be retained pre-consonant in Serbo-Croatian loanwords, particularly in surnames such as Живкович (Živkovič, from Serbo-Croatian Živković).

One unusual phenomenon is that for any conjugated verb form that ends in -ме (-me), any unvoiced consonant immediately preceding this suffix is voiced. For instance, плєцме (pljecme), the first-person plural imperative form of плєсц (pljesc, "to knit"), is pronounced [ˈpʎɛd͡zmɛ] rather than [ˈpʎɛt͡smɛ]. This phenomenon is shared with standard Slovak, and is likewise generally not reflected in spelling. The main exception of this is the first-person plural present verb form зме (zme, "we are"), pronounced [zmɛ], which is the same as Slovak sme. Both forms come from Old Slovak sme.

While not a direct result of voicing or devoicing, there is a tendency for [k] to shift to [x] when preceding or proceeding [t]. For example, Old Slovak dotknúť is most commonly realized as дотхнуц rather than доткнуц, although the latter is also attested in dictionaries. Similarly, Old Slovak kto becomes хто rather than кто. This may be a result of Carpathian Rusyn influence or at least reinforcement; in both Carpathian Rusyn and standard Ukrainian, the cognate term is also хто, as opposed to кто in Russian. This phenomenon also occurs in certain loanwords; compare дохтор (doxtor, "medical doctor"), which differentiates with доктор (doktor, "person with a doctorate").

== Orthography ==
Pannonian Rusyn is written using the Cyrillic script. This Cyrillic-based orthography has been used in an unofficial capacity since at least the beginning of the 20th century, popularized by Rusyn writer, poet, grammarian, linguist and philosopher Havriil Kostelnyk with his book of poems З мойого валала (Z mojoho valala, "From my village", 1903), with further texts written in the 1920s and 30s, including Граматика бачваньско-рускей бешеди (Gramatika bačvan'sko-ruskej bešedi, "Grammar of the Bačka-Rusyn language") published in 1923.

Based on Kostelnyk's work, Pannonian Rusyn was further codified and standardized by Mikola Kočiš in Правопис руского язика (Pravopis ruskoho jazika; "Orthography of the Rusyn language", 1971) and Ґраматика руского язика (Gramatika ruskoho jazika; "Grammar of the Rusyn language", 1974), albeit with rather minimal changes, as texts written in the 1920s are still almost completely intelligible today.

The Pannonian Rusyn alphabet
А а	Б б	В в	Г г	Ґ ґ	Д д	Е е	Є є
Ж ж	З з	И и	Ї ї	Й й	К к	Л л	М м
Н н	О о	П п	Р р	С с	Т т	У у	Ф ф
Х х	Ц ц	Ч ч	Ш ш	Щ щ	Ю ю	Я я	Ь ь

The Pannonian Rusyn alphabet has 32 letters. It includes all the letters of the Ukrainian alphabet except І/і. Like the Carpathian Rusyn alphabets, and like the Ukrainian alphabet until 1990, the Pannonian Rusyn alphabet places ь after я, while the vast majority of Cyrillic alphabets place ь before э (if present), ю, and я.

The letter ⟨щ⟩ represents [ʃt͡ʃ], i.e. a combination of ⟨шч⟩ like in Ukrainian and Carpathian Rusyn. And like the Bulgarian letter ⟨щ⟩, the two sounds represented separately are almost never written out as two letters, with the (occasional) exception of transliterating Serbo-Croatian шћ / šć. For instance, the village Kruščić is always spelled Крущич, and not *Крушчич. Similarly, when the term тиґриш (tigriš, "tiger") is suffixed with the baby animal suffix -че (-če), it forms a term pronounced as [tiˈɡriʃt͡ʃɛ], but this is spelt тиґрище rather than *тиґришче.

Prior to the standardization of the Cyrillic script, various scripts were informally used, including a Latin script based on the Hungarian orthography. Sometimes, this would lead to certain phonemes being misconstrued; for instance, the river and canal Bega, known in Serbo-Croatian as "Begej", was genericized into the word meaning "canal" in Pannonian Rusyn as early as the late 1800s. However, it was then spelt as begely in the unofficial Hungarian script, as the digraph ly is pronounced [j] in modern Hungarian. Confusion arose as other Pannonian Rusyn speakers used ly to represent [ʎ], the palatalized form of [l] (spelt in modern Cyrillic as ль). Hence, what was originally [ˈbɛɡɛj] became [ˈbɛɡɛʎ], and the word is today spelt in Cyrillic as беґель. The Serbian Cyrillic alphabet was also used in the 1930s, with the letters ⟨ј⟩, ⟨љ⟩, and ⟨њ⟩, so modern анї and лєм were spelt as ањи and љем respectively.

The Cyrillic orthography was standardized based on the dialect spoken in Ruski Krstur. One notable deviation is found in the Kucura dialect, where the plural past perfect is realized with the ending -лї instead of -ли, as is standard. For instance, читали ("they were reading"), normally pronounced [t͡ʃiˈtali], would be pronounced as if spelt читалї, i.e. [t͡ʃiˈtaʎi], in the Kucura dialect. The ending is nonetheless written as -ли.

Only four consonants - д, л, н, т - may be followed by the soft sign ⟨ь⟩, in which /d/, /l/, /n/, /t/ are palatalized and become /ɟ/, /ʎ/, /ɲ/, /c/ (and not /dʲ/, /lʲ/, /nʲ/, /tʲ/). These four consonants also attain this value when followed by ⟨є⟩, ⟨ї⟩, ⟨я⟩ or ⟨ю⟩. For all other consonants, ⟨є⟩, ⟨ї⟩, ⟨й⟩, ⟨я⟩ or ⟨ю⟩ only produce an additional /j/ sound followed by the corresponding vowel sound. In Carpathian Rusyn on the other hand, ⟨є⟩, ⟨ї⟩, ⟨й⟩, ⟨я⟩ or ⟨ю⟩ may also follow consonants such as ⟨з⟩, ⟨р⟩, ⟨с⟩ or ⟨ц⟩ depending on the specific orthography, for instance in the phrase в межичасї (v mežyčasji, "in the meantime"). In certain Pannonian loanwords from Carpathian Rusyn, word-final ⟨дь⟩ and ⟨ть⟩ may even be outright reduced to ⟨д⟩ and ⟨т⟩ respectively; Carpathian Господь, вість, память (Hospod′, vist′, pamjat′, "Lord, piece of news, memory") are frequently rendered as Господ, вист and памят (Hospod, vist, pamjat) in Pannonian Rusyn writing, with вист in particular in fact being the standard prescribed form.

Like with the Ukrainian orthography, the apostrophe ⟨'⟩ is also used to divide two consonants to prevent forming affricates, such as под'жемни (pod'žemni, "underground") (composed of под-, "under" and жемни, "earth; ground") being pronounced [pɔdˈʒɛmni] rather than [pɔˈd͡ʒɛmni]; or it may be used to prevent a palatalizable consonant from being palatalized, such as in the word ст'юардеса (st'juardesa, "female flight attendant, stewardess") which is pronounced with [stju-] rather than [scu-].

=== Comparison with the Carpathian Rusyn alphabets ===
The Prešov Rusyn alphabet of Slovakia has 36 letters. It includes all the letters of the Pannonian Rusyn alphabet plus ё, і, ы, and ъ.

The Lemko Rusyn alphabet of Poland has 34 letters. It includes all the letters of the Pannonian Rusyn alphabet with the exception of ї, plus і, ы, and ъ.

In the Ukrainian alphabet, и precedes і and ї, and the Pannonian Rusyn alphabet (which doesn't have і) follows this precedent by placing и before ї. In the Prešov Rusyn alphabet, however, і and ї come before и, and likewise, і comes before и in the Lemko Rusyn alphabet (which doesn't have ї).

It should also be noted that ⟨г⟩ and ⟨ґ⟩ are treated as entirely independent letters and usage of the latter is not optional, as it may be in the Belarusian and Ukrainian orthographies. For instance, where Ukrainian has гамбургер (hamburher) for "hamburger", Pannonian Rusyn only uses гамбурґер (hamburger). Nonetheless, there are certain loanwords, most often from Carpathian Rusyn and/or Old Church Slavonic, that display ⟨г⟩ even though its counterpart in Serbo-Croatian may use ⟨г⟩ [ɡ], such as граждан (hraždan, "citizen"), Єгипет (Jehipet, "Egypt"), and гречески (hrečeski, "Greek").

=== Latinization ===
There does not exist a standardized Latin-script orthography for Pannonian Rusyn. Due to all Pannonian Rusyns being Serbo-Croatian speakers, if any Latinization is required (say for use in a web domain or to render a Rusyn surname in a Croatian system), Gaj's Latin alphabet is used. For most letters, the conversion is relatively straightforward; however, at least in Serbia, ⟨г⟩ and ⟨х⟩ are both Latinized as ⟨h⟩, bearing in mind that /ɦ/ is not used in Serbo-Croatian. This may lead to confusion, for instance Гелена being Latinized as Helena and erroneously re-Cyrillicized as Хелена in Pannonian Rusyn. On the other hand, Serbo-Croatian ⟨h⟩ often corresponds to ⟨ch⟩ in West Slavic languages, so the Eastern Slovak surname Kaňuch becomes Канюх in Pannonian Rusyn Cyrillic, then Кањух in Serbian Cyrillic, and finally Kanjuh in Gaj's Latin Alphabet.

⟨дь⟩ and ⟨ть⟩ tend to be Latinized as ⟨đ⟩ and ⟨ć⟩, as seen in the surname Надьмитьо (from Hungarian Nagymityo), which is generally rendered as Nađmićo. However, this is not always the case the other way round; Serbo-Croatian ⟨ć⟩, especially in modern borrowings or renderings of surnames, tends to be Cyrillicized as ⟨ч⟩, for instance kafić / кафић ("café") → кафич, or Pavlović / Павловић (a surname) → Павлович. Older loanwords may display ⟨ть⟩, such as dućan / дућан ("shop") → дутян, although this particular case may have been influenced by Hungarian duttyán.

On the other hand, Serbo-Croatian ja, je, ji and ju are always Cyrillicized as я, є, ї and ю, with no exceptions. Therefore, whereas "Miami" is rendered Майами in Russian, it is spelt as Маями in Pannonian Rusyn. If a Serbo-Croatian word is rendered with dj or tj, then an apostrophe is added before я, є, ї or ю; for instance, Тјентиште ("Tjentište") is spelt Т'єнтиште instead of Тєнтиште.

==== Croatian Latin alphabet ====
Some Rusyns in Croatia may write Pannonian Rusyn using the Latin alphabet. Unlike in Serbia, [x] tends to be spelt as ⟨ch⟩. Elsewise, the alphabet is similar to Gaj's Latin alphabet, albeit with ⟨dj⟩ and ⟨tj⟩ in place of ⟨đ⟩ and ⟨ć⟩, as well as ⟨dz⟩ as a separate digraph. ⟨ь⟩ is rendered as ⟨j⟩. The Croatian Pannonian Rusyn Latin alphabet is thus as follows:

The Croatian Pannonian Rusyn Latin alphabet
A a	B b	V v	H h	G g	D d	Dj dj
Dž dž	Dz dz	E e	Ž ž	Z z	I i	J j
K k	L l	Lj lj	M m	N n	Nj nj	O o
P p	R r	S s	T t	Tj tj	U u	F f
Ch ch	C c	Č č	Š š

An example of its use is as follows:

Pannonian Rusyn Cyrillic	Croatian Latin	English Translation
Кед голубица лєцела, дробни пиречка трацела,	Ked holubica ljecela, drobni pirečka tracela,	When the dove flew, she was losing little feathers,
Лєцела вона през гори до своєй милей мацери;	Ljecela vona prez hori do svojej milej maceri;	She flew across the mountain to her dear mother;
Хижочко стара, худобко наша,	Chižočko stara, chudobko naša,	Old maisonette, our poor little one,
ти нам на билим швеце найкрасша.	ti nam na bilim švece najkrasša.	you are to us the most beautiful in the whole wide world.

Note the use of ⟨ch⟩ rather than ⟨h⟩ for writing [x] with chižočko and chudobko.

== Vocabulary ==
Being a language born of unique circumstances, Pannonian Rusyn bears numerous lexical influences.

=== Old Slovak ===
A large amount of vocabulary is inherited from Old Slovak, and West Slavic cognates may be found in standard Slovak and/or Czech. For example, схопни (sxopni, "capable") being cognate with Czech and Slovak schopný, нащивиц (naščivic, "to visit") sharing a common origin with Czech navštívit and Slovak navštíviť, or озда (ozda, "perhaps") corresponding to Slovak azda.

In a majority of cases, Proto-Slavic *dь and *tь, later Old Slovak ď, ť, become дз and ц in Pannonian Rusyn. This is a common feature across Eastern Slovak dialects. For instance, Proto-Slavic *děti becomes Pannonian Rusyn дзеци (dzeci, "children") [ˈd͡zɛt͡si] compared to Slovak deti [ˈɟɛci]. This phenomenon is also observed in the singular locative forms of certain nouns whose root end in -d or -t, for instance место (mesto) → месце (mesce), or пойд (pojd) → пойдзе (pojdze). In some cases, this may converge with the standard Slovak term, such as Pannonian Rusyn медзи (medzi, "between") and Slovak medzi both being [ˈmɛd͡zi]; or цесто (cesto, "dough") and Slovak cesto both being [ˈt͡sɛstɔ]. While the sounds of [ɟ] and [c] do exist in Pannonian Rusyn, as in Czech and standard Slovak, they are only used in loanwords, chiefly those from Carpathian Rusyn or Hungarian.

On the other hand, unlike Czech and Slovak, Proto-Slavic *zь and *sь have largely been retained, in the form of ⟨ж⟩ and ⟨ш⟩. For example, the word for "today" is нєшка (nješka), a reduced form of днєшка (dnješka) which comes from Proto-Slavic *dьnьsьka, whence also Czech dneska, with *sь hardened to s. This also occurs before vowels, for instance Proto-Slavic *beseda → Pannonian Rusyn бешеда (bešeda), or Proto-Slavic *zelenъ → Pannonian Rusyn желєни (željeni). This is most prevalent in the reflexive particle, which in Czech is se, in standard Slovak sa (dialectally, also se), but in Pannonian Rusyn it is ше (še), which perhaps bears greater phonological similarity to Polish się. This is also seen in the locative form of certain nouns, for instance лєс (ljes) becoming лєше (lješe) in the locative, or ґузел (guzel) becoming ґужлє (gužlje); in adverbs derived from adjectives in -сни, like радосни (radosni, "happy, merry") and радошнє (radošnje, "happily, merrily"), which compare Polish radośnie; as well as in the present tense conjugated forms of verbs whose infinitives end in -снуц or -знуц, such as роснуц (rosnuc, "to grow") becoming рошнє (rošnje, "is growing"), or марзнуц (marznuc, "to freeze") becoming маржнє (maržnje, "is freezing"); compare Polish rosnąć, rośnie, but marznąć, marznie. It is also worth noting, however, that the palatalization of [n] does not necessarily indicate a preceding з → ж / с → ш shift; take for example познєйше (poznjejše, "later"), originally the comparative adverb of позни (pozni, "late").

Certain inherited words display an unusual shift of *e, *ě or *ę → ей (ej), for example *pętь ("five") and *šestь ("six") → пейц (pejc), шейсц (šejsc). Some of these forms are in fact attested in Old Slovak, such as pejc, however there is no uniformity to this shift. It sometimes even occurs in loanwords, such as шейтац (šejtac, "to walk") from a combination of Hungarian sétál and Serbo-Croatian шетати / šetati, or Бейч (Bejč, "Vienna") from Hungarian Bécs.

Otherwise, Proto-Slavic interconsonantal *-ě- has a tendency to shift to -i-, akin to Czech (-í-), but where Slovak would display -ie-. For instance, Proto-Slavic *věra ("faith, belief") → Czech víra and Pannonian Rusyn вира (vira), but Slovak viera.

=== Carpathian Rusyn ===
In this case, Carpathian Rusyn refers to the East Slavic dialects spoken in the regions between Poland, Slovakia and Ukraine, often referred to simply as Rusyn. One common trait of a loanword from Carpathian Rusyn is the usage of дь, ть, which are not found in native Pannonian Rusyn words inherited from Old Slovak. For example, надїя (nadjija, "hope"), from Carpathian Rusyn надїя, or дїдо (djido, "grandfather") from Carpathian Rusyn дїдо.

Another trait is the use of ⟨и⟩ where etymologically the word would have displayed ⟨о⟩. This usually indicates a Carpathian Rusyn word which displayed an *o → ⟨і⟩ or ⟨ӱ⟩ shift. For instance, мрія (mrija, "dream", cf. Belarusian мроя (mroja)) → Pannonian Rusyn мрия (mrija, "imagination"), or чарівник (čarivnyk) or even *чарӱвник (*čarüvnyk, "wizard") → Pannonian Rusyn чаривнїк (čarivnjik, "wizard, magician"), cf. Old Slovak čarovník. In certain cases, ⟨и⟩ in place of ⟨е⟩ can also be an indicator of a Carpathian Rusyn borrowing, such as сивер (siver, "north") from сївер (sjiver), where a native Slovak inherit would have yielded something akin to *шевер (*šever); however, as mentioned above, this E > I shift sometimes also occurs in Slovak inherited forms, such as sled > *slied > *slíd > *ślíd > Pannonian Rusyn шлїд (šljid).

Some common Pannonian Rusyn given names are of Carpathian Rusyn origin, such as Митро (Mitro) probably being a reduced form of Дмитро (Dmytro), or Микола (Mikola) being from Carpathian Rusyn Микола (Mykola), the Rusyn and Ukrainian variant of Nicholas. In some cases, Carpathian Rusyn given names may become surnames in Pannonian Rusyn, such as Микита (Mikita) from Микита (Mykyta) or Хома (Homa / Choma) from Хома (Xoma).

A number of country names or otherwise place names also derive from Carpathian Rusyn, for instance Галичина (Haličina, "Galicia"), from Carpathian Rusyn Галичина (Halyčyna); or Китай (Kitaj, "China") from Carpathian Rusyn Кітай (Kitaj).

=== Hungarian ===
Hungarian loanwords may be divided into pre-Pannonian migration, and post-migration. Pre-migration words are often also found in Carpathian Rusyn, such as ґовля (govlja, "stork") from Hungarian gólya, whereas post-migration Hungarian loanwords are often shared with Serbo-Croatian, such as варош (varoš, "city; town") from város.

As a general rule, Hungarian ó tends to become ов (ov) in Pannonian Rusyn, usually pronounced [ɔw], but may change to [ɔv] in declined forms, as in ашов (ašov, "spade", from Hungarian ásó) [ˈaʃɔw], but ашови (ašovi, "spades") [aˈʃɔvi]. For certain words, Hungarian é may become ей (ej), such as cédula becoming цейдула (cejdula) in the Kucura dialect, or Bécs ("Vienna") being colloquially referred to as Бейч (Bejč). Hungarian h may be rendered as ⟨г⟩, such as in Горват (Horvat, "Croatian") from Hungarian horvat; or it may be rendered as ⟨х⟩, e.g. харча (xarča, "catfish") from harcsa.

Unlike in other Slavic languages, ⟨k⟩ in Hungarian loanwords (or loanwords via a Hungarian intermediate) often shifts to ⟨ґ⟩ in Pannonian Rusyn, for instance bicikli → бициґла (bicigla, "bicycle"), or paprika → паприґа (papriga, "pepper"). In some instances, this is due to Pannonian Rusyn borrowing a common folk pronunciation rather than the written word; for example, bicikli is commonly pronounced [ˈbit͡siɡli] rather than [ˈbit͡sikli] in Hungarian.

One tendency in Pannonian Rusyn is that diminutives or otherwise nouns in Hungarian ending in -ica or -ika often become -ичка (-ička). For example, ládika ("small box, case") becomes ладичка (ladička), and Katica ("Cathy, Katie", part of the compound word katicabogár ("ladybird")) becomes (божа) катичка ((boža) katička, "ladybird").

In addition to regular vocabulary, many Pannonian Rusyns also bear Hungarian surnames (and/or, less often, first names), such as Надь (Nad') from Hungarian Nagy (literally "big"), Тамаш (Tamaš) from Tamás ("Thomas"), or Дюри (Djuri) from Gyuri, a diminutive of György ("George"). It is also not uncommon that certain Hungarian compound surnames are univerbated into a singular term, such as Кишюгас (Kišjuhas) from Kis-Juhász, literally "Small-Shepherd", though Киш and Югас both exist as separate Rusyn surnames. Some of these names and surnames are also found among Czechs and Slovaks, as well as other Rusyns.

=== Serbo-Croatian ===
In the two centuries since Pannonian Rusyns moved to modern-day Croatia and Serbia, a large amount of vocabulary from Serbo-Croatian has entered the language. This includes almost all internationalisms, country names, and modern technical vocabulary. Some of these may be direct borrowings, or they may be calques. Examples include заєднїца (zajednjica, "community") from Serbo-Croatian заједница / zajednica, or потримац (potrimac, "to support") being a calque of Serbo-Croatian подржати / podržati. This extends to many modern-day technologies; for instance, the term for an HTTP cookie is колачик (kolačik, literally "little baked good"), which is a semantic loan of Serbo-Croatian колачић / kolačić.

Certain loans into Pannonian Rusyn are derived from older Serbo-Croatian terms, that remain in use even after they become increasingly dated or even obsolete in Serbian and Croatian. For instance, дзелїдба (dzeljidba, "division") is a derivation from Serbo-Croatian делидба / delidba or дјелидба / djelidba, which displaced the earlier form дзельба (dzel'ba). However, the inverse has seemed to occur in Serbo-Croatian, where the forms деоба / deoba or диоба / dioba have become the dominant forms, all while Pannonian Rusyn continues to use дзелїдба (dzeljidba). Another example is полицай (policaj, "police officer"), from German Polizei. Whereas modern Serbo-Croatian appends a Slavic suffix to the term to create полицајац / policajac, the preferred form in Pannonian Rusyn is still полицай (policaj), even though there also exists a similar derivation полицаєц (policajec).

Many country names, especially of European countries, as well as certain European subnational divisions, end in either -ска (-ska) or -цка (-cka) and decline using a feminine adjectival declension, for instance Нємецка (Njemecka, "Germany"), genitive/dative/locative Нємецкей (Njemeckej). This is likely a calque of Serbo-Croatian -ска / -ska, which also declines with an adjectival declension: Немачка / Nemačka, Немачкој / Nemačkoj.

Whereas non-Slavic noun loanwords with atypical vowel endings are often indeclinable in West and East Slavic languages, Pannonian Rusyn has adopted the Serbo-Croatian style of loanword declension, that is, appending the corresponding case suffix, even if it creates vowel groupings atypical in Slavic. For instance, the phrase "in Peru" would be rendered as в Перу or v/w Peru in most East and West Slavic languages, with no change to the word "Peru", but in Pannonian Rusyn, it would be у Перуу, same as Serbo-Croatian u Peruu, appending the locative singular suffix -у / -u to the proper noun Peru, despite it creating the atypical vowel cluster -uu.

Certain words may be a blend of Slovak, Carpathian Rusyn and Serbo-Croatian all at once; for instance, пошлїдок (pošljidok) seems to be a blend of Serbo-Croatian последица / posledica, Pannonian Rusyn шлїд (šljid, via an unattested Old Slovak *slied), and Carpathian Rusyn наслїдок (nasljidok).

Serbo-Croatian influence has also promoted the use of certain words that had already existed in Old Slovak, but had become obsolete in modern standard Slovak. For instance, the use of the word тайна (tajna, "secret") due to influence from Serbo-Croatian тајна / tajna, or сушеда (sušeda, "female neighbour") due to influence from Serbo-Croatian суседа / suseda, where modern Slovak instead prefers susedka. In some cases however, the similarities may be down to coincidence; збогом ("goodbye") exists in both Serbo-Croatian (zbogom) and in Pannonian Rusyn (zbohom), however phrases like ísť z Bohom (literally "to go with God") have been attested in Old Slovak since at least as early as 1681, and indeed zbohom is still used in modern Slovak as it is in Pannonian Rusyn.

As citizens of Serbia and Croatia, Pannonian Rusyns are also increasingly giving their children names from Serbo-Croatian (respelt using the Rusyn orthography, e.g. Ljiljana / Љиљана → Лїляна), or occasionally creating names based on Serbo-Croatian ones. For instance, one male given name is Дзвонко (Dzvonko), modelled after Serbo-Croatian Zvonko / Звонко, with influence from дзвон (dzvon, "bell"). This is despite the fact that Zvonko / Звонко is not formed from the word for "bell", but rather a diminutive form of Zvonimir / Звонимир.

Certain names may be rendered slightly differently depending on whether it was borrowed from Serbo-Croatian or from Carpathian Rusyn; for example, the equivalent of "Alexander" may be either Александар (Aleksandar, via Serbo-Croatian) or Александер (Aleksander, via Carpathian Rusyn), although the former is generally preferred; and the equivalent of "Helen" may be Єлена (Jelena), Гелена (Helena), Хелена (Xelena), or Олена (Olena).

==== Proscribed Serbisms ====
In the modern era, due to all Pannonian Rusyns being fluent speakers of Serbian or Croatian (depending on which country they live in), certain colloquialisms from Serbo-Croatian may be used in casual speech or informal writing, which tend to be proscribed by education authorities. Two examples of this are да (da, "so as to") and ґод (god, "-ever"), which come from Serbo-Croatian да / da and год / god respectively, where teachers would usually recommend using the native mostly-equivalents най (naj) and гоч (hoč). Where these two are commonly used even in written Pannonian Rusyn, one very common chiefly spoken filler used by Rusyns is овай (ovaj, "uh, um"), also used by Serbs and Croats as овај / ovaj.

Despite the proscription, some of these Serbisms have been used in Pannonian Rusyn for over a century; да (da), for example, is attested in a letter dated to July of 1925, and may have even been used prior to that. Furthermore, there exist some ubiquitous Serbisms which are not proscribed by language authorities. These are often prepositions, such as док (dok, "while, as long as") or спрам (spram, "towards").

=== English ===
The vast majority of anglicisms in Pannonian Rusyn, including and especially technical and technological terminology, entered the language via Serbo-Croatian. There are nonetheless some exceptions, such as the obsolete word штрицкара (štrickara, "tram") from English streetcar, or чунґам (čungam) from chewing gum.

If the English word contains an ⟨h⟩, then it is usually rendered in Pannonian Rusyn as ⟨г⟩, even though the Serbo-Croatian term would use ⟨х⟩. For instance, English humor → Serbo-Croatian хумор / humor → Pannonian Rusyn гумор (humor), although there are rare exceptions like Айдахо (Ajdaxo) for Idaho.

Certain English words may be morphologically modified depending on the intermediate language(s), such as бифтек (biftek, "steak") from English beefsteak via French bifteck.

=== Other languages ===
Pannonian Rusyn also has some vocabulary from German, some of which may have entered via Bavarian. For instance, софт (soft, "gravy") from Såft, the Bavarian variant of German Saft. Some such vocabulary may be present in other languages in the region; шпоргет (šporhet, "stove"), from German Sparherd (possibly via some Bavarian *Spårhet), is cognate with Hungarian sparhelt and Serbo-Croatian шпархет / šparhet. In some cases, German vocabulary may be retained where they may have become obsolete in other Slavic languages, such as гайзибан (hajziban, "train"), from German Eisenbahn, which also exists in obsolete Serbo-Croatian as ajzliban, and dialectally in Polish as ejzebana.

Some words from Ottoman Turkish are also commonplace in Pannonian Rusyn, such as дутян (dutjan, "shop") and маджун (madžun, "jam"). These terms most likely entered Pannonian Rusyn via a Serbo-Croatian intermediate.

Modern derivations from Czech or Slovak are uncommon, however some terms are hard to explain as deriving from elsewhere. Czech derivations in Pannonian Rusyn enter the language most often via Serbo-Croatian modern-day coinages, such as часопис (časopis, "magazine, journal") or рукопис (rukopis, "handwriting; manuscript"). On the other hand, there also exists the term моторка (motorka, "motorcycle, motorbike"), which either developed spontaneously in Pannonian Rusyn, or it may be a derivation from Czech/Slovak motorka, as моторка / motorka in Serbo-Croatian means "chainsaw", bearing in mind also that ethnic Slovaks also live in Vojvodina and in fact outnumber Rusyns.

== Education ==
After the World War II, in the socialist Yugoslavia, Rusyns were officially recognized as a distinct ethnic minority, and their legal status was regulated in Yugoslav constituent republics of Serbia and Croatia. In the 1963 Constitution of the Socialist Republic of Serbia, Rusyns were designated as one of seven (explicitly named) ethnic minorities, and the same provision was implemented in the Statute of Vojvodina (an autonomous province of Serbia) that was adopted in the same year. During the same period, Rusyn ethnic minority was also recognized in the Socialist Republic of Croatia, by the Constitutional Amendment IV, that was adopted in 1972. That provision was confirmed by the new 1974 Constitution of the Socialist Republic of Croatia, that recognized not only local Rusyns but also local Ukrainians, thus designating them as separate and distinct ethnic minorities.

Consequently, a Rusyn language high school was established in Ruski Krstur (Руски Керестур, Serbian: Руски Крстур / Ruski Krstur), the cultural centre of the Pannonian Rusyns. At least 250 Rusyn language books have been printed so far for the high school and elementary schools in the region.)

There is a lectureship at the Rusyn Studies at Novi Sad University.

== Media ==
There are regular television and radio programmes in Pannonian Rusyn, by the regional public broadcaster Radio Television of Vojvodina, including the multilingual radio station Radio Novi Sad 3, with the breakdown of minutes broadcasting language in 2001 was as follows: 23.5% Serbian, 23.5% Hungarian, 5.7% Slovak, 5.7% Romanian, 3.8% Rusyn, 2.2% Romani, and 0.2% Ukrainian.

== See also ==
- Old Ruthenian
- Carpathian Rusyn language
- Pannonian Rusyns

== Sources ==
- Barić, Eugenija (2007). Rusinski jezik u procjepu prošlosti i sadašnjosti. Zagreb: Institut za hrvatski jezik i jezikoslovlje. ISBN 9789536637348.
- Bunčić, Daniel (2015). "On the dialectal basis of the Ruthenian literary language" (PDF). Die Welt der Slaven. 60 (2): 276–289.
- Fejsa, Mihajlo P. (2014). "The Ruthenian journey from the Carpathian mountains to the Panonian Plain". Русин. 36 (2): 182–191.
- Fejsa, Mihajlo P. (2017a). "The improvement of the orthographic rules in the Bachka-Srem Rusin Language". Русин. 50 (4): 165–178.
- Fejsa, Mihajlo P. (2017b). "Ruthenian Minority in Vojvodina and its Language". Balkanistic Forum. 26 (3): 66–77.
- Fejsa, Mihajlo P. (2018a). "Verb forms/constructions in the Prešov variant and the Bačka-Srem variant of the Rusyn language". Studia Slavica. 63 (2): 367–378. doi:10.1556/060.2018.63.2.16. S2CID 145920941.
- Fejsa, Mihajlo P. (2018b). "The Adaptation of Anglicisms in the Ruthenian Language" (PDF). Зборник Матице српске за филологију и лингвистику. 61 (1): 125–142.
- Катунин, Дмитрий А. (2015a). "Языковые права русинов, украинцев и других национальных меньшинств в законодательстве Республики Сербия". Русин: Международный исторический журнал. 39 (1): 229–238. Archived from the original on 2024-12-02.
- Кольесаров, Юлиян Д. (1977). Панонско-руски язик. Монтреал.
- Костельник, Габор (1923). Граматика бачваньско-рускей бешеди. Руски Керестур: Руске нар. просвитне дружтво.
- Kushko, Nadiya (2007). "Literary Standards of the Rusyn Language: The Historical Context and Contemporary Situation". The Slavic and East European Journal. 51 (1): 111–132. JSTOR 20459424.
- Magocsi, Paul R. (1988a). Carpatho-Rusyn Studies: An Annotated Bibliography. Vol. 1. New York: Garland. ISBN 9780824012144.
- Magocsi, Paul R. (1988b). Carpatho-Rusyn Studies: An Annotated Bibliography. Vol. 2. New York: Garland. ISBN 9780880334204.
- Magocsi, Paul R. (1996). "The Rusyn language question revisited" (PDF). International Journal of the Sociology of Language (120): 63–84. doi:10.1515/ijsl.1996.120.63. S2CID 56325995.
- Magocsi, Paul R.; Pop, Ivan I., eds. (2002). Encyclopedia of Rusyn History and Culture (1. ed.). Toronto: University of Toronto Press. ISBN 9780802035660.
- Magocsi, Paul R. (2011). "The Fourth Rus': A New Reality in a New Europe" (PDF). Journal of Ukrainian Studies. 35-36 (2010-2011): 167–177.
- Magocsi, Paul R. (2015). With Their Backs to the Mountains: A History of Carpathian Rus' and Carpatho-Rusyns. Budapest-New York: Central European University Press. ISBN 9786155053467.
- Медєши, Гелена; Тимко-Дїтко, Оксана; Фейса, Михайло (2010). "Руско-сербски словнїк". Rusyn - Serbian Dictionary. Нови Сад: Филозофски факултет, Одсек за русинистику: Завод за културу войводянских Руснацох.
- Moser, Michael A. (2018). "The Fate of the Ruthenian or Little Russian (Ukrainian) Language in Austrian Galicia (1772-1867)". Harvard Ukrainian Studies. 35 (2017–2018) (1/4): 87–104. JSTOR 44983536.
- Plishkova, Anna (2009). Language and National Identity: Rusyns South of Carpathians. Boulder: East European Monographs.
- Ramač, Janko (2018). "Osnovni pravci, težnje i dileme u kulturno-prosvetnom i nacionalnom životu Rusina u Jugoslaviji (1945-1970)" (PDF). Київські історичні студії. 6 (1): 63–73.
- Рамач, Јулијан; Фејса, Михајло; Међеши, Хелена, eds. (1995). Српско-русински речник (PDF). Vol. 1. Нови Сад: Филозофски факултет - Катедра за русински језик и књижевност, Друштво за русински језик и књижевност.
- Рамач, Јулијан; Фејса, Михајло; Међеши, Хелена, eds. (1997). Српско-русински речник (PDF). Vol. 2. Београд-Нови Сад: Завод за уџбенике и наставна средства, Филозофски факултет - Катедра за русински језик и књижевност, Друштво за русински језик и књижевност.
- Sakač, Marija (2019). "Narratives of ethnic identity and language among young Pannonian Ruthenians in Serbia". Adeptus. 14: 1–18.
