= Slovak language =

West Slavic language

Slovak
- slovenčina, slovenský jazyk
- Pronunciation: [ˈslɔʋentʂina], [ˈslɔʋenskiː ˈjazik]
- Native to: Slovakia, Czech Republic, Hungary, Carpathian Ruthenia, Slavonia, and Vojvodina
- Ethnicity: Slovaks, Pannonian Rusyns
- Speakers: L1: 5 million (2012–2021); L2: 2.1 million (2012)
- Language family: Indo-European: Balto-Slavic; Slavic; West Slavic; Czech–Slovak; Slovak
- Dialects: Western Slovak; Central Slovak; Eastern Slovak (including Pannonian Rusyn)
- Writing system: Latin (Slovak alphabet); Slovak Braille; Cyrillic (Pannonian Rusyn alphabet)

Official status
- Official language in: Slovakia; European Union; Vojvodina (Serbia)
- Recognised minority language in: Czech Republic; Poland; Hungary Croatia; Austria Romania; Montenegro; Ukraine
- Regulated by: Ministry of Culture of the Slovak Republic

Language codes
- ISO 639-1: sk
- ISO 639-2: slo (B) slk (T)
- ISO 639-3: slk
- Glottolog: slov1269
- Linguasphere: 53-AAA-db < 53-AAA-b...–d (varieties: 53-AAA-dba to 53-AAA-dbs)
- The Slovak-speaking world: regions where Slovak is the language of the majority regions where Slovak is the language of a significant minority

Slovak (/ˈsloʊvæk, -vɑːk/ SLOH-va(h)k; endonym: slovenčina [ˈslɔʋent͡ʂina] or slovenský jazyk [ˈslɔʋenskiː ˈjazik]), is a West Slavic language of the Czech–Slovak group, written in Latin script. It is part of the Indo-European language family, and is one of the Slavic languages, which are part of the larger Balto-Slavic branch. Spoken by approximately five million people as a native language, primarily ethnic Slovaks, it serves as the official language of Slovakia and one of the 24 official languages of the European Union.

Slovak is closely related to Czech, to the point of very high mutual intelligibility, as well as to Polish. Like other Slavic languages, Slovak is a fusional language with a complex system of morphology and relatively flexible word order. Its vocabulary has been extensively influenced by Latin and German, as well as other Slavic languages.

== History ==
The Czech–Slovak group developed within West Slavic in the high medieval period, and the standardization of Czech and Slovak within the Czech–Slovak dialect continuum emerged in the early modern period. In the later mid-19th century, the modern Slovak alphabet and written standard became codified by Ľudovít Štúr and reformed by Martin Hattala. The Moravian dialects spoken in the western part of the country along the border with the Czech Republic are also sometimes classified as Slovak, although some of their western variants are closer to Czech; they nonetheless form the bridge dialects between the two languages.

== Geographic distribution and status ==
Slovak language is primarily spoken in Slovakia. The country's constitution declared it the official language of the state (štátny jazyk):

(1) Na území Slovenskej republiky je štátnym jazykom slovenský jazyk. (2) Používanie iných jazykov než štátneho jazyka v úradnom styku ustanoví zákon.

(1) The Slovak language is the official language on the territory of the Slovak Republic. (2) The use of languages other than the official language in official communication shall be laid down by law.

Constitution of Slovakia, Article 6.

Beside that, national minorities and ethnic groups also have explicit permission to use their distinct languages. Slovakia is a country with an established language policy concerning its official language.

=== Regulation ===
Standard Slovak (spisovná slovenčina) is defined by an Act of Parliament on the State Language of the Slovak Republic (language law). According to this law, the Ministry of Culture approves and publishes the codified form of Slovak based on the judgment of specialised Slovak linguistic institutes and specialists in the area of the state language. This is traditionally the Ľudovít Štúr Institute of Linguistics, which is part of the Slovak Academy of Sciences. In practice, the Ministry of Culture publishes a document that specifies authoritative reference books for standard Slovak usage, which is called the codification handbook (kodifikačná príručka). The current regulations were published on 15 March 2021. There are four such publications:

- 'Pravidlá slovenského pravopisu', 2013; (orthographic rules)
- 'Krátky slovník slovenského jazyka', 2020; (dictionary)
- 'Pravidlá slovenskej výslovnosti', 2009; (pronunciation)
- 'Morfológia slovenského jazyka', 1966; (morphology)

Slovak speakers are also found in the Slovak diaspora in the United States, the Czech Republic, Argentina, Serbia, Ireland, Romania, Poland, Canada, Hungary, Germany, Croatia, Israel, the United Kingdom, Australia, Austria, Ukraine, Norway, and other countries to a lesser extent.

The Slovak language is one of the official languages of Autonomous Province of Vojvodina.

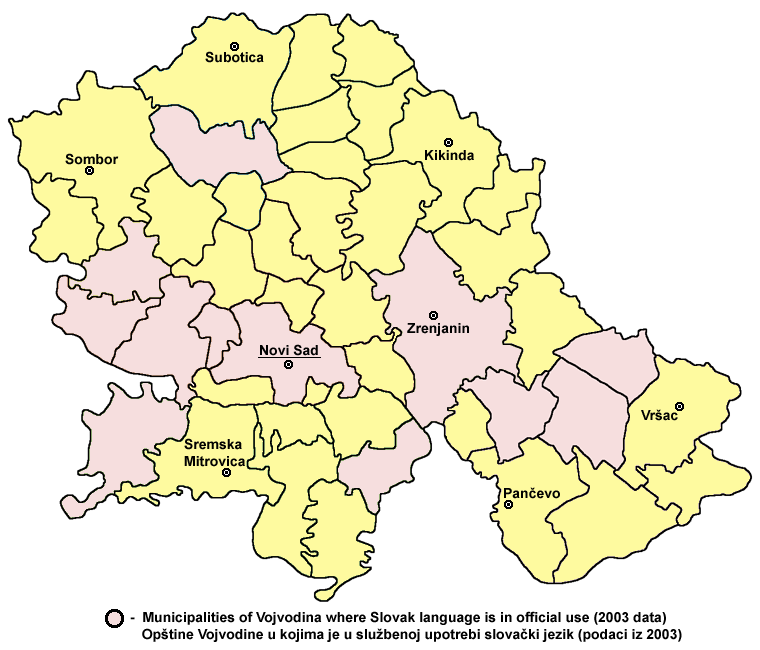
Official usage of Slovak in Vojvodina, Serbia

=== Slovak language high schools abroad ===
- Budapest, 'Szlovák Tanítási Nyelvű Óvoda, Általános Iskola, Gimnázium és Kollégium'
- Békéscsaba, 'Szlovák Gimnázium, Általános Iskola, Óvoda és Kollégium'
- Bački Petrovac, 'Ján Kollár Gymnasium and Students' Home'
- Kovačica, 'Gimnazija Mihailo Pupin'
- Nădlac, 'Liceul Teoretic Jozef Gregor Tajovský'

== Dialects ==
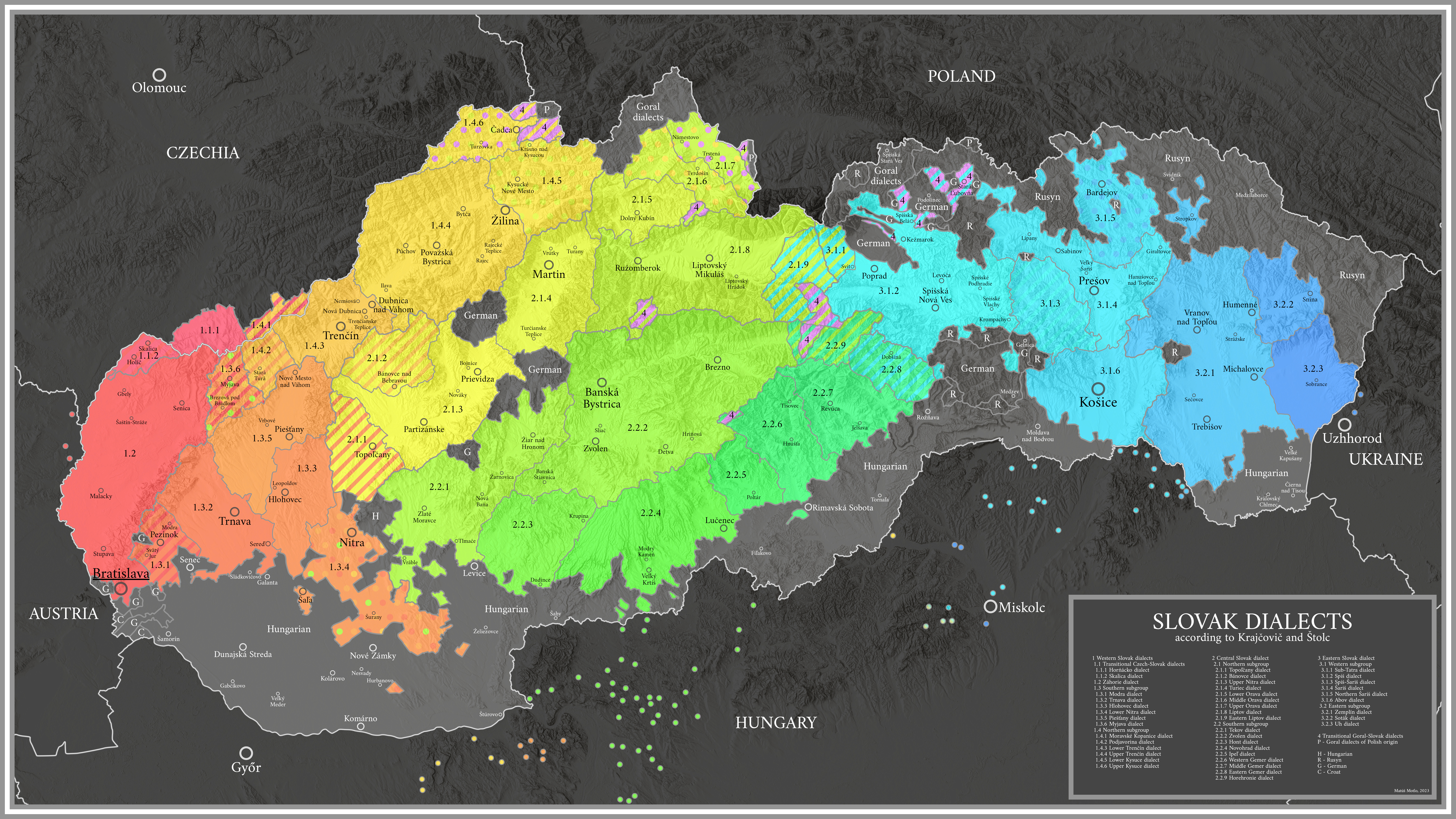
Slovak dialects

Linguistic structure of Slovakia in 2021

There are many Slovak dialects, which are divided into the following four basic groups:

- Western Slovak dialects (Trenčín, Trnava, Nitra, Záhorie)
- Central Slovak dialects (in Liptov, Orava, Turiec, Tekov, Hont, Novohrad, Gemer and around Zvolen.)
- Eastern Slovak dialects (in Spiš, Šariš, Zemplín and Abov)
- Lowland (dolnozemské) Slovak dialects (outside Slovakia in the Pannonian Plain in Serbian Vojvodina, and in southeastern Hungary, western Romania, and the Croatian part of Syrmia)

The fourth group of dialects is often not considered a separate group, but a subgroup of Central and Western Slovak dialects (see e.g. Štolc, 1968), but it is currently undergoing changes due to contact with surrounding languages (Serbo-Croatian, Romanian, and Hungarian) and long-time geographical separation from Slovakia (see the studies in Zborník Spolku vojvodinských slovakistov, e.g. Dudok, 1993).

The dialect groups differ mostly in phonology, vocabulary, and tonal inflection. Syntactic differences are minor. Central Slovak forms the basis of the present-day standard language. Not all dialects are fully mutually intelligible. It may be difficult for an inhabitant of the western Slovakia to understand a dialect from eastern Slovakia and the other way around.

The dialects are fragmented geographically, separated by numerous mountain ranges. The first three groups already existed in the 10th century. All of them are spoken by the Slovaks outside Slovakia, and central and western dialects form the basis of the lowland dialects (see above).

The western dialects contain features common with the Moravian dialects in the Czech Republic, the southern central dialects contain a few features common with South Slavic languages, and the eastern dialects a few features common with Polish and the East Slavonic languages (cf. Štolc, 1994). Lowland dialects share some words and areal features with the languages surrounding them (Serbo-Croatian, Hungarian, and Romanian).

== Phonology ==
Slovak contains 15 vowel phonemes (11 monophthongs and four diphthongs) and 29 consonants.

Slovak vowel phonemes
	Front		Back	
	short	long	short	long
Close	i	iː	u	uː
Mid	e	eː	ɔ	(ɔː)
Open	(æ)		a	aː
Diphthongs	(ɪu) ɪe ɪɐ ʊɔ			

The phoneme /æ/ is marginal and often merges with /e/; the two are normally only distinguished in higher registers.

Vowel length is phonemic in Slovak and both short and long vowels have the same quality. In addition, Slovak, unlike Czech, employs a "rhythmic law" which forbids two long vowels from following one another within the same word. In such cases the second vowel is shortened. For example, adding the locative plural ending -ách to the root vín- creates vínach, not *vínách. This law also applies to diphthongs; for example, the adjective meaning "white" is biely, not *bielý (compare Czech bílý).

Slovak consonant phonemes
			Labial	Alveolar	Retroflex	Palatal	Velar	Glottal
Nasal			m	n		ɲ		
Plosive		voiceless	p	t		c	k	
Plosive		voiced	b	d		ɟ	ɡ	
Affricate		voiceless		ts	tʂ			
Affricate		voiced		dz	dʐ			
Fricative		voiceless	f	s	ʂ		x	
Fricative		voiced	v	z	ʐ			ɦ
Approximant	plain		v			j		
Approximant	lateral	short		l		ʎ		
Approximant	lateral	geminated		lː				
Trill		short		r				
Trill		geminated		rː				

Slovak has final devoicing; when a voiced consonant (b, d, ď, g, dz, dž, z, ž, h) is at the end of a word before a pause, it is devoiced to its voiceless counterpart (p, t, ť, k, c, č, s, š, ch, respectively). For example, pohyb is pronounced /pɔɦip/ and prípad is pronounced /priːpat/.

Consonant clusters containing both voiced and voiceless elements are entirely voiced if the last consonant is a voiced one, or voiceless if the last consonant is voiceless. For example, otázka is pronounced /ɔtaːska/ and vzchopiť sa is pronounced /fsxɔpitsːa/. This rule also applies across word boundaries. For example, prísť domov [priːzɟ dɔmɔw] (to come home) and viac jahôd [ʋɪɐdz jaɦʊɔt] (more strawberries). The voiced counterpart of "ch" /x/ is [ɣ], and the unvoiced counterpart of "h" /ɦ/ is /x/.

== Orthography ==
Slovak uses the Latin script with small modifications that include the four diacritics (ˇ, ´, ¨, ˆ) placed above certain letters (a-á,ä; c-č; d-ď; dz-dž; e-é; i-í; l-ľ,ĺ; n-ň; o-ó,ô; r-ŕ; s-š; t-ť; u-ú; y-ý; z-ž)

- A a [a]
- Á á [aː]
- Ä ä [ɛ]
- B b [b]
- C c [ts]
- Č č [t͡ʃ or tʂ]
- D d [d]
- Ď ď [ɟ]
- Dz dz [dz]
- Dž dž [d͡ʒ or dʐ]
- E e [ɛ]
- É é [ɛː]
- F f [f]
- G g [ɡ]
- H h [ɦ]
- Ch ch [x]
- I i [i]
- Í í [iː]
- J j [j]
- K k [k]
- L l [l]
- Ľ ľ [ʎ]
- Ĺ ĺ [lː]
- M m [m]
- N n [n]
- Ň ň [ɲ]
- O o [ɔ]
- Ó ó [ɔː]
- Ô ô [o]
- P p [p]
- Q q [kʋ]
- R r [r]
- Ŕ ŕ [r̩ː]
- S s [s]
- Š š [ʃ or ʂ]
- T t [t]
- Ť ť [c]
- U u [u]
- Ú ú [uː]
- V v [ʋ]
- W w [ʋ]
- X x [ks]
- Y y [i]
- Ý ý [iː]
- Z z [z]
- Ž ž [ʒ or ʐ]

Letters displayed in Italic are used in loanwords and foreign names.

The primary principle of Slovak spelling is the phonemic principle. The secondary principle is the morphological principle: forms derived from the same stem are written in the same way even if they are pronounced differently. An example of this principle is the assimilation rule (see below). The tertiary principle is the etymological principle, which can be seen in the use of i after certain consonants and of y after other consonants, although both i and y are usually pronounced the same way.

Finally, the rarely applied grammatical principle occurs when, for example, the basic singular form and plural form of masculine adjectives are written differently with no difference in pronunciation (e.g. pekný = nice – singular versus pekní = nice – plural). Such spellings are most often remnants of differences in pronunciation that were present in Proto-Slavic (in Polish, where the vowel merger did not occur, piękny and piękni and in Czech pěkný and pěkní are pronounced differently).

Most loanwords from foreign languages are respelt using Slovak principles either immediately or later. For example, "weekend" is spelled víkend, "software" – softvér, "gay" – gej (both not exclusively), and "quality" is spelled kvalita. Personal and geographical names from other languages using Latin alphabets keep their original spelling unless a Slovak exonym exists (e.g. Londýn for "London").

Slovak features some heterophonic homographs (words with identical spelling but different pronunciation and meaning), the most common examples being krásne /ˈkraːsnɛ/ (beautiful) versus krásne /ˈkraːsɲɛ/ (beautifully).

== Grammar ==
=== Syntax ===
The main features of Slovak syntax are as follows:

- The verb (predicate) agrees in person and number with its subject.

Some examples include the following:

Speváčka spieva. (The+singer+feminine suffix čka is+singing.)
(Speváčk-a spieva-∅, where -∅ is (the empty) third-person-singular ending)

Speváčky spievajú. (Singer+feminine suffix čka+plural suffix y are+singing.)
(Speváčk-y spieva-j-ú; -ú is a third-person-plural ending, and /j/ is a hiatus sound)

My speváčky spievame. (We the+singer+feminine suffix čka+plural suffix y are+singing.)
(My speváčk-y spieva-me, where -me is the first-person-plural ending)
and so forth.

- Adjectives, pronouns and numerals agree in person, gender and case with the noun to which they refer.
- Adjectives precede their noun. Botanic or zoological terms are exceptions (e.g. mačka divá, literally "cat wild", Felis silvestris) as is the naming of Holy Spirit (Duch Svätý) in a majority of churches.

Word order in Slovak is relatively free, since strong inflection enables the identification of grammatical roles (subject, object, predicate, etc.) regardless of word placement. This relatively free word order allows the use of word order to convey topic and emphasis.

Some examples are as follows:

Ten veľký muž tam dnes otvára obchod. = That big man is opening a store there today. (ten = that; veľký = big; muž = man; tam = there; dnes = today; otvára = opens; obchod = store) – The word order does not emphasize any specific detail, just general information.
Ten veľký muž dnes otvára obchod tam. = That big man is today opening a store there. – This word order emphasizes the place (tam = there).
Dnes tam otvára obchod ten veľký muž. = Today over there a store is being opened by that big man. – This word order focuses on the person who is opening the store (ten = that; veľký = big; muž = man).
Obchod tam dnes otvára ten veľký muž. = The store over there is today being opened by that big man. – Depending on the intonation the focus can be either on the store itself or on the person.

The unmarked order is subject–verb–object. Variation in word order is generally possible, but word order is not completely free. In the above example, the noun phrase ten veľký muž cannot be split up, so that the following combinations are not possible:

Ten otvára veľký muž tam dnes obchod.
Obchod muž tam ten veľký dnes otvára. ...

And the following sentence is stylistically infelicitous:

Obchod ten veľký muž dnes tam otvára. (Only possible in a poem or other forms of artistic style.)

The regular variants are as follows:

Ten veľký muž tam dnes otvára obchod.
Ten veľký muž tam otvára dnes obchod.
Obchod tam dnes otvára ten veľký muž.
Obchod tam otvára dnes ten veľký muž.
Dnes tam obchod otvára ten veľký muž.
Dnes tam ten veľký muž otvára obchod.

=== Morphology ===
==== Articles ====
Slovak, like every major Slavic language other than Bulgarian and Macedonian, does not have articles. The demonstrative pronoun in masculine form ten (that one) or tá in feminine and to in neuter respectively, may be used in front of the noun in situations where definiteness must be made explicit.

==== Nouns, adjectives, pronouns ====
Slovak nouns are inflected for case and number. There are six cases: nominative, genitive, dative, accusative, locative, and instrumental. The vocative is purely optional and most of the time unmarked. It is used mainly in spoken language and in some fixed expressions: mama mum (nominative) vs. mami mum! (vocative), tato, oco dad (N) vs. tati, oci dad! (V), pán Mr., sir vs. pane sir (when addressing someone e.g. in the street). There are two numbers: singular and plural. Nouns have inherent gender. There are three genders: masculine, feminine, and neuter. Adjectives and pronouns must agree with nouns in case, number, and gender.

==== Numerals ====
The numerals 0–10 have unique forms, with numerals 1–4 requiring specific gendered representations. Numerals 11–19 are formed by adding násť to the end of each numeral. The suffix dsať is used to create numerals 20, 30 and 40; for numerals 50, 60, 70, 80 and 90, desiat is used. Compound numerals (21, 1054) are combinations of these words formed in the same order as their mathematical symbol is written (e.g. 21 = dvadsaťjeden, literally "twenty-one").

The numerals are as follows:

1–10		11–20		10–100	
1	jeden (number, masculine), jedno (neuter), jedna) (feminine)	11	jedenásť	10	desať
2	dva (number, masculine inanimate), dve (neuter, feminine), dvaja (masculine animate)	12	dvanásť	20	dvadsať
3	tri (number, neuter, masculine inanimate, feminine), traja (masculine animate)	13	trinásť	30	tridsať
4	štyri (number, neuter, masculine inanimate, feminine), štyria (masculine animate)	14	štrnásť	40	štyridsať
5	päť	15	pätnásť	50	päťdesiat
6	šesť	16	šestnásť	60	šesťdesiat
7	sedem	17	sedemnásť	70	sedemdesiat
8	osem	18	osemnásť	80	osemdesiat
9	deväť	19	devätnásť	90	deväťdesiat
10	desať	20	dvadsať	100	sto

Some higher numbers: (200) dvesto, (300) tristo, (400) štyristo, (900) deväťsto, (1,000) tisíc, (1,100) tisícsto, (2,000) dvetisíc, (100,000) stotisíc, (200,000) dvestotisíc, (1,000,000) milión, (1,000,000,000) miliarda.

Counted nouns have two forms. The most common form is the plural genitive (e.g. päť domov = five houses or stodva žien = one hundred two women), while the plural form of the noun when counting the amounts of 2–4, etc., is usually the nominative form without counting (e.g. dva domy = two houses or dve ženy = two women) but gender rules do apply in many cases.

==== Verbs ====
Verbs have three major conjugations. Three persons and two numbers (singular and plural) are distinguished. Subject personal pronouns are omitted unless they are emphatic.

- Some imperfective verbs are created from the stems of perfective verbs to denote repeated or habitual actions. These are considered separate lexemes. One example is as follows: to hide (perfective) = skryť, to hide (habitual) = skrývať.
- Historically, two past tense forms were utilized. Both are formed analytically. The second of these, equivalent to the pluperfect, is not widely used in the modern language, being rather considered archaic. Examples for two related verbs are as follows:

skryť: skryl som (I hid / I have hidden); bol som skryl (I had hidden)
skrývať: skrýval som; bol som skrýval.

- One future tense exists. For imperfective verbs, it is formed analytically; for perfective verbs, it is identical to the present tense. Some examples are as follows:

skryť: skryjem
skrývať: budem skrývať

- Two conditional forms exist. Both are formed analytically from the past tense:

skryť: skryl by som (I would hide), bol by som skryl (I would have hidden)
skrývať: skrýval by som; bol by som skrýval

- The passive voice is formed either as in English (copula + passive participle) or using the reflexive pronoun 'sa':

skryť: je skrytý; skryje sa
skrývať: je skrývaný; skrýva sa

- The passive participle (= ~ed (one), the "third form") is formed using the suffixes -ný / -tý / -ený:

skryť: skrytý
skrývať: skrývaný

- The active present participle (= ~ing (one)) is formed using the suffixes -úci / -iaci / -aci

skryť: skryjúci
skrývať: skrývajúci

- The transgressive (=(while/by) ...ing) is formed using the suffixes -úc / -uc / -iac/-ac.

skryť: skryjúc (by hiding (perfective))
skrývať: skrývajúc ((while/during) hiding)

- The active past participle (= ~ing (in the past)) was formerly formed using the suffix -vší, but is no longer used.
- The gerund (= the (process of) ...ing) is formed using the suffix -ie:

skryť: skrytie
skrývať: skrývanie

==== Conjugations ====
Several conjugation paradigms exist as follows:

á-type verbs (Class I)
volať, to call	Singular	Plural	Past tense (masculine – feminine – neuter)
1st person	volám	voláme	volal – volala – volalo
2nd person	voláš	voláte	
3rd person	volá	volajú	

á-type verbs (Class I) + rhythmical rule
bývať, to live, dwell, but not exist	Singular	Plural	Past tense
1st person	bývam	bývame	býval – bývala – bývalo
2nd person	bývaš	bývate	
3rd person	býva	bývajú	

á-type verbs (Class I) (soft stem)
vracať, to return or (mostly in slang) to vomit	Singular	Plural	Past tense
1st person	vraciam	vraciame	vracal – vracala – vracalo
2nd person	vraciaš	vraciate	
3rd person	vracia	vracajú	

í-type verbs (Class V)
robiť, to do, work	Singular	Plural	Past tense
1st person	robím	robíme	robil – robila – robilo
2nd person	robíš	robíte	
3rd person	robí	robia	

í-type verbs (Class V) + rhythmical rule
vrátiť, to return	Singular	Plural	Past tense
1st person	vrátim	vrátime	vrátil – vrátila – vrátilo
2nd person	vrátiš	vrátite	
3rd person	vráti	vrátia	

e-type verbs (Class IV) (-ovať)
kupovať, to buy	Singular	Plural	Past tense
1st person	kupujem	kupujeme	kupoval – kupovala – kupovalo
2nd person	kupuješ	kupujete	
3rd person	kupuje	kupujú	

e-type verbs (Class IV) (-nuť, typically preceded by a consonant)
zabudnúť, to forget	Singular	Plural	Past tense
1st person	zabudnem	zabudneme	zabudol – zabudla – zabudlo
2nd person	zabudneš	zabudnete	
3rd person	zabudne	zabudnú	

ie-type verbs (Class V)
vidieť, to see	Singular	Plural	Past tense
1st person	vidím	vidíme	videl – videla – videlo
2nd person	vidíš	vidíte	
3rd person	vidí	vidia	

ie-type verbs (Class III) (-nuť, typically preceded by a vowel)
minúť, to spend, miss	Singular	Plural	Past tense
1st person	miniem	minieme	minul – minula – minulo
2nd person	minieš	miniete	
3rd person	minie	minú	

ie-type verbs (Class III) (-cť, -sť, -zť)
niesť, to carry	Singular	Plural	Past tense
1st person	nesiem	nesieme	niesol – niesla – nieslo
2nd person	nesieš	nesiete	
3rd person	nesie	nesú	

ie-type verbs (Class II) (-nieť)
stučnieť, to carry (be fat)	Singular	Plural	Past tense
1st person	stučniem	stučnieme	stučnel – stučnela – stučnelo
2nd person	stučnieš	stučniete	
3rd person	stučnie	stučnejú	

Irregular verbs
	byť, to be	jesť, to eat	vedieť, to know
1st singular	som	jem	viem
2nd singular	si	ješ	vieš
3rd singular	je	je	vie
1st plural	sme	jeme	vieme
2nd plural	ste	jete	viete
3rd plural	sú	jedia	vedia
Past tense	bol, bola, bolo	jedol, jedla, jedlo	vedel, vedela, vedelo

=== Adverbs ===
Adverbs are formed by replacing the adjectival ending with the ending -o or -e / -y. Sometimes both -o and -e are possible. Examples include the following:

vysoký (high) – vysoko (highly)
pekný (nice) – pekne (nicely)
priateľský (friendly) – priateľsky (in a friendly manner)
rýchly (fast) – rýchlo (quickly)

The comparative of adverbs is formed by replacing the adjectival ending with a comparative/superlative ending -(ej)ší or -(ej)šie, whence the superlative is formed with the prefix naj-. Examples include the following:

rýchly (fast) – rýchlejší (faster) – najrýchlejší (fastest): rýchlo (quickly) – rýchlejšie (more quickly) – najrýchlejšie (most quickly)

==== Prepositions ====
Each preposition is associated with one or more grammatical cases. The noun governed by a preposition must agree with the preposition in the given context. The preposition od always calls for the genitive case, but some prepositions such as po can call for different cases depending on the intended sense of the preposition.

from friends = od priateľov (genitive case of priatelia)
around the square = po námestí (locative case of námestie)
up to the square = po námestie (accusative case of námestie)

== Vocabulary ==
Slovak is a descendant of Proto-Slavic, itself a descendant of Proto-Indo-European. It is closely related to the other West Slavic languages, primarily to Czech and Polish. Czech also influenced the language in its later development. The highest number of borrowings in the old Slovak vocabulary come from Latin, German, Czech, Hungarian, Polish and Greek (in that order). Recently, it is also influenced by English.

=== Czech ===
Although most dialects of Czech and Slovak are mutually intelligible (see Comparison of Slovak and Czech), eastern Slovak dialects are less intelligible to speakers of Czech and closer to Polish and East Slavic, and contact between speakers of Czech and speakers of the eastern dialects is limited.

Since the dissolution of Czechoslovakia it has been permitted to use Czech in TV broadcasting and during court proceedings (Administration Procedure Act 99/1963 Zb.). From 1999 to August 2009, the Minority Language Act 184/1999 Z.z., in its section (§) 6, contained the variously interpreted unclear provision saying that "When applying this act, it holds that the use of the Czech language fulfills the requirement of fundamental intelligibility with the state language"; the state language is Slovak and the Minority Language Act basically refers to municipalities with more than 20% ethnic minority population (no such Czech municipalities are found in Slovakia). Since 1 September 2009 (due to an amendment to the State Language Act 270/1995 Z.z.) a language "fundamentally intelligible with the state language" (i.e. the Czech language) may be used in contact with state offices and bodies by its native speakers, and documents written in it and issued by bodies in the Czech Republic are officially accepted. Regardless of its official status, Czech is used commonly both in Slovak mass media and in daily communication by Czech natives as an equal language.

Czech and Slovak have a long history of interaction and mutual influence well before the creation of Czechoslovakia in 1918, a state which existed until 1993. Literary Slovak shares significant orthographic features with Czech, as well as technical and professional terminology dating from the Czechoslovak period, but phonetic, grammatical, and vocabulary differences do exist.

=== Other Slavic languages ===
Slavic language varieties are relatively closely related, and have had a large degree of mutual influence, due to the complicated ethnopolitical history of their historic ranges. This is reflected in the many features Slovak shares with neighboring language varieties. Standard Slovak shares high degrees of mutual intelligibility with many Slavic varieties. Despite this closeness to other Slavic varieties, significant variation exists among Slovak dialects. In particular, eastern varieties differ significantly from the standard language, which is based on central and western varieties.

Eastern Slovak dialects have the greatest degree of mutual intelligibility with Polish of all the Slovak dialects, followed by Rusyn, but both Eastern Slovak and Rusyn lack familiar technical terminology and upper register expressions. Polish and Sorbian also differ quite considerably from Czech and Slovak in upper registers, but non-technical and lower register speech is readily intelligible. Some mutual intelligibility occurs with spoken Rusyn, Ukrainian, and even Russian (in this order), as their orthographies are based on the Cyrillic script.

English	Slovak	Czech	Polish	Rusyn	Ukrainian	Belarusian	Serbo-Croatian	Bulgarian	Slovenian
to buy	kupovať	kupovat	kupować	куповати (kupovaty)	купувати (kupuvaty)	купляць (kuplać)	kupovati	купува (kupuva)	kupovati
Welcome	Vitajte	Vítejte	Witajcie	Вітайте (vitajte)	Вітаю (vitaju)	Вітаю (vitaju)	Dobrodošli	добре дошли (dobre došli)	Dobrodošli
morning	ráno	ráno/jitro	rano/ranek	рано (rano)	рано/ранок (rano/ranok)	рана/ранак (rana/ranak)	jutro	утро (utro)	jutro
Thank you	Ďakujem	Děkuji	Dziękuję	Дякую (diakuju)	Дякую (diakuju)	Дзякуй (dziakuj)	Hvala	благодаря (blagodarja)	Hvala
How are you?	Ako sa máš?	Jak se máš?	Jak się masz? (colloquially "jak leci?")	Як ся маєш/маш? (jak sia maješ/maš?)	Як справи? (jak spravy?)	Як справы? (jak spravy?)	Kako si?	Как си? (Kak si?)	Kako se imaš?/Kako si?
How are you?	Ako sa máš?	Jak se máš?	Jak się masz? (colloquially "jak leci?")	Як ся маєш/маш? (jak sia maješ/maš?)	Як ся маєш? (jak sia maješ?)	Як маесься? (jak majeśsia?)	Kako si?	Как си? (Kak si?)	Kako se imaš?/Kako si?

=== Latin ===
- bakuľa: baculum (stick)
- kláštor: claustrum (monastery)
- kostol: castellum (church)
- košeľa: casula (shirt)
- machuľa: macula (blot, stain)
- škola: scola (school)
- skriňa: skrinium (cupboard)
- titul: titulus (title)

=== English ===
Sports:

- športovať: to do sports
- šport: sport
- futbal: football (Association football; it can also mean American football, especially when specified as americký futbal)
- ofsajd: offside
- aut: out (football)
- hokej: hockey
- bodyček: body check (hockey)

Food:

- hemendex: ham & eggs
- kečup: ketchup

Clothing:

- džínsy: jeans
- legíny: leggings
- sveter: sweater
- tenisky: tennis shoes

Exclamations:

- fajn: fine
- super: super
- okej: OK

=== German ===
Nouns:

- brak: Brack (rubbish)
- cech: Zeche (guild)
- cieľ: Ziel (goal/target)
- cín: Zinn (tin)
- deka: Decke (blanket)
- drôt: Draht (wire)
- erb: erben (coat-of-arms, from "to inherit")
- faloš: Falschheit (falsity)
- farba: Farbe (color)
- fašiangy: Fasching (carnival)
- fialka: Veilchen (viola)
- fľaša: Flasche (bottle)
- fúra: Fuhre (load)
- gróf: Graf (count)
- hák: Haken (hook)
- helma: Helm (helmet)
- hoblík: Hobel (hand plane)
- jarmok: Jahrmarkt (funfair)
- knedľa: Knödel (dumpling)
- minca: Münze (coin)
- ortieľ: Urteil (verdict)
- pančucha: Bundschuh (stocking)
- plech: Blech (sheet metal)
- regál: Regal (shelf)
- ruksak: Rucksack (backpack)
- rúra: Rohr (pipe)
- rytier: Ritter (knight)
- šachta: Schacht (mine shaft)
- šindeľ: Schindel (roof shingle)
- šnúra: Schnur (cord)
- taška: Tasche (purse)
- téma: Thema (topic)
- vaňa: Badewanne (bathtub)
- Vianoce: Weihnachten (Christmas)
- vločka: Flocke (flake)
- žumpa: Sumpf (cesspit)

Verbs:

- študovať: studieren (to study (as in, to major in))
- vinšovať: wünschen (to wish)
  - Note: colloquially, the standard term in Slovak is želať

Greetings:

Servus is commonly used as a greeting or upon parting in Slovak-speaking regions and some German-speaking regions, particularly Austria. Papa is also commonly used upon parting in these regions. Both servus and papa are used in colloquial, informal conversation.

=== Hungarian ===
Hungarians and Slovaks have had language interaction ever since the settlement of Hungarians in the Carpathian area. Hungarians also adopted many words from various Slavic languages related to agriculture and administration, and a number of Hungarian loanwords are found in Slovak. Some examples are as follows:

- "wicker whip": Slovak korbáč (the standard name for "whip" is bič and korbáč, itself originating from Turkish kırbaç, usually means only one particular type of it—the "wicker whip") – Hungarian korbács;
- "dragon/kite": Slovak šarkan (rather rare, drak is far more common in this meaning; šarkan often means only "kite", especially a small one that is flown for fun and this term is far more common than drak in this meaning; for the "dragon kite", the term drak is still used almost exclusively) – Hungarian sárkány.
- "rumour": Slovak chýr, Hungarian hír;
- "camel": Slovak ťava, Hungarian teve;
- "ditch": Slovak jarok, Hungarian árok;
- "glass": Slovak pohár, Hungarian pohár;

== Sample text ==
Article 1 of the Universal Declaration of Human Rights in Slovak (latin script):

Všetci ľudia sa rodia slobodní a rovní v dôstojnosti aj právach. Sú obdarení rozumom a svedomím a majú sa k sebe správať v duchu bratstva.

Article 1 of the Universal Declaration of Human Rights in English:

All human beings are born free and equal in dignity and rights. They are endowed with reason and conscience and should act towards one another in a spirit of brotherhood.

== See also ==
- Slovak orthography
- Slovak phonology
- Slovak declension
- List of language regulators for a list of languages with a regulated standard variety

== Bibliography ==
- Dudok, D. (1993), Vznik a charakter slovenských nárečí v juhoslovanskej Vojvodine [The emergence and character of the Slovak dialects in Yugoslav Vojvodina], Zborník spolku vojvodinských slovakistov, vol. 15, Nový Sad: Spolok vojvodinských slovakistov, pp. 19–29
- Hanulíková, Adriana; Hamann, Silke (2010), "Slovak" (PDF), Journal of the International Phonetic Association, 40 (3): 373–378, doi:10.1017/S0025100310000162, archived (PDF) from the original on 16 December 2019
- Kráľ, Ábel (1988), Pravidlá slovenskej výslovnosti, Bratislava: Slovenské pedagogické nakladateľstvo
- Musilová, K.; Sokolová, M. (2004), "Funkčnost česko-slovenských kontaktových jevů v současnosti" [The functionality of Czech-Slovak contact phenomena in the present-time], in Fiala, J.; Machala, L. (eds.), Studia Moravica I, AUPO, Facultas Philosophica Moravica, vol. 1, Olomouc: Univerzita Palackého v Olomouci, pp. 133–146
- Nábělková, M. (2003), "Súčasné kontexty slovensko-českej a česko-slovenskej medzijazykovosti" [Contemporary contexts of the Slovak-Czech and Czech-Slovak interlinguality], in Pospíšil, I.; Zelenka, M. (eds.), Česko-slovenské vztahy v slovanských a středoevropských souvislostech (meziliterárnost a areál), Brno: ÚS FF MU, pp. 89–122
- Nábělková, M. (2006), "V čom bližšie, v čom ďalej... Spisovná slovenčina vo vzťahu k spisovnej češtine a k obecnej češtine" [In what closer, in what further... Standard Slovak in relation to Standard Czech and Common Czech], in Gladkova, H.; Cvrček, V. (eds.), Sociální aspekty spisovných jazyků slovanských, Praha: Euroslavica, pp. 93–106
- Nábělková, M. (2007), "Closely related languages in contact: Czech, Slovak, "Czechoslovak"", International Journal of the Sociology of Language (183): 53–73, doi:10.1515/IJSL.2007.004
- Nábělková, M. (2008), Slovenčina a čeština v kontakte: Pokračovanie príbehu [Slovak and Czech in Contact: Continuation of the Story], Bratislava: Veda, ISBN 978-80-224-1060-1
- Pavlík, Radoslav (2004), Bosák, Ján; Petrufová, Magdaléna (eds.), "Slovenské hlásky a medzinárodná fonetická abeceda" [Slovak Speech Sounds and the International Phonetic Alphabet] (PDF), Jazykovedný časopis [The Linguistic Journal] (in Slovak), 55 (2), Bratislava: Slovak Academic Press, spol. s r. o.: 87–109, ISSN 0021-5597, archived (PDF) from the original on 14 April 2020
- Sloboda, M. (2004), "Slovensko-česká (semi)komunikace a vzájemná (ne)srozumitelnost" [Slovak-Czech (semi)communication and the mutual (un)intelligibility], Čeština doma a ve světě, 12 (3–4): 208–220
- Sokolová, M. (1995), "České kontaktové javy v slovenčine" [Czech contact phenomena in Slovak], in Ondrejovič, S.; Šimková, M. (eds.), Sociolingvistické aspekty výskumu súčasnej slovenčiny, Sociolinguistica Slovaca, vol. 1, Bratislava: Veda, pp. 188–206
- Štolc, Jozef (1968), Reč Slovákov v Juhoslávii I.: Zvuková a gramatická stavba [The speech of the Slovaks in Yugoslavia: phonological and grammatical structure], Bratislava: Vydavateľstvo Slovenskej akadémie vied
- Štolc, Jozef (1994), Ripka, I. (ed.), Slovenská dialektológia [Slovak dialectology], Bratislava: Veda
