= Modrow =

Modrow is a surname. Notable people with the surname include:

- Ernst-Wilhelm Modrow (1908–1990), German World War II flying ace
- Hans Modrow (1928–2023), German politician

== See also ==
- Modrý
