= Modrý =

Modrý or Modry (pronounced [ˈmodriː]; feminine form Modrá [ˈmodraː]) is a Czech and Slovak surname. It is derived from the Czech–Slovak word modrý for "blue", originally probably a nickname for a "blue eyed" person. People with the name include:

- Bohumil Modrý (1916–1963), Czechoslovak ice hockey player
- Jaroslav Modrý (born 1971), Czech ice hockey player

== See also ==
- Modra (surname)
- Modrá
