= Czech–Slovak languages =

Subgroup of West Slavic languages

Czech–Slovak
- Geographic distribution: Czech Republic and Slovakia
- Ethnicity: Czechs and Slovaks
- Linguistic classification: Indo-European: Balto-Slavic; Slavic; West Slavic; Czech–Slovak
- Early forms: Proto-Indo-European: Proto-Balto-Slavic; Proto-Slavic
- Subdivisions: Czech • Knaanic†; Slovak • Pannonian Rusyn

Language codes
- Glottolog: czec1260
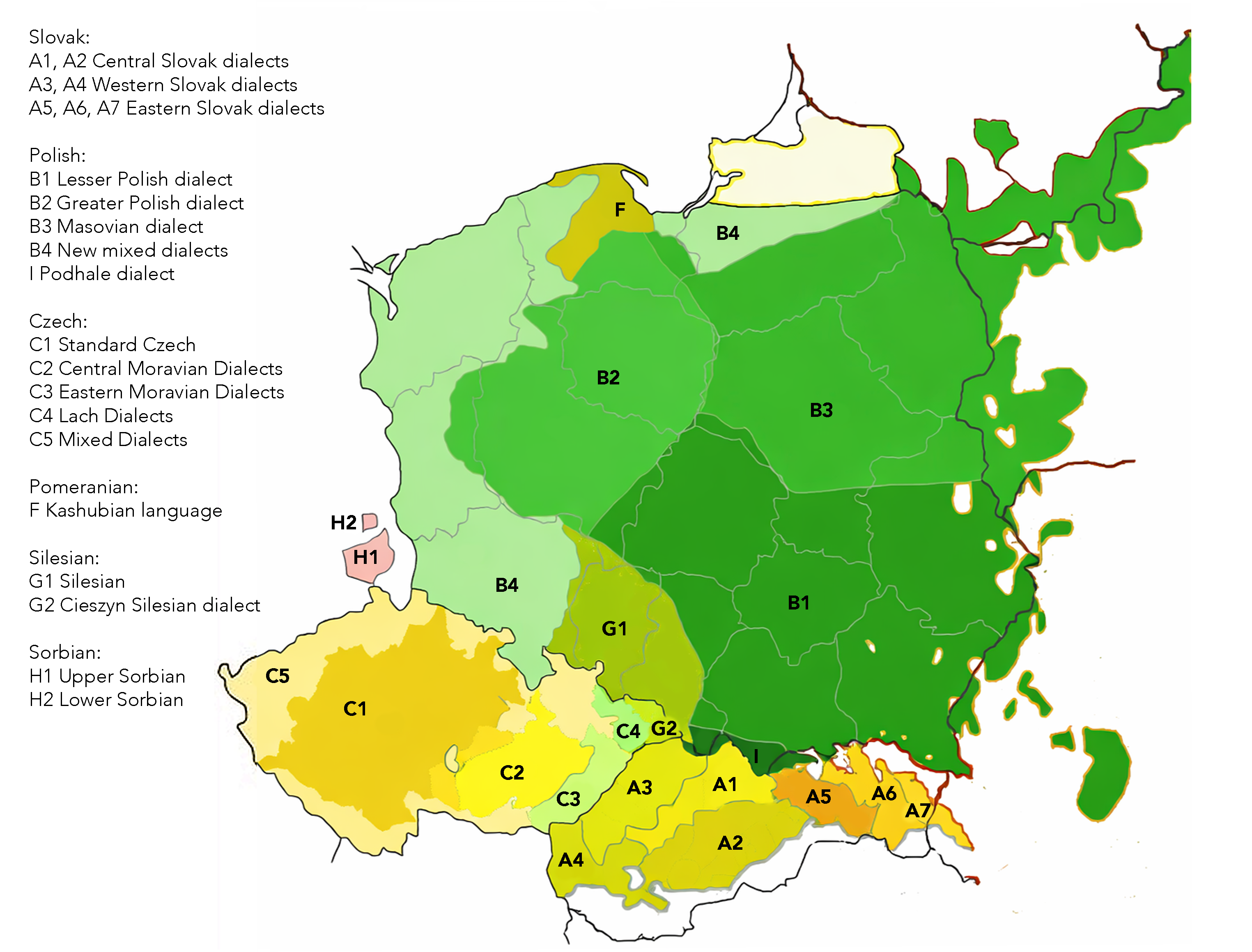
- Czech–Slovak dialects in yellow and gold (A/C), within West Slavic

The Czech–Slovak languages (or Czecho-Slovak languages) are a subgroup branched from the West Slavic languages comprising the Czech and Slovak languages.

Most varieties of Czech and Slovak are mutually intelligible, forming a dialect continuum (spanning the intermediate Moravian dialects) rather than being two clearly distinct languages; standardised forms of these two languages are, however, easily distinguishable and recognizable because of disparate vocabulary, orthography, pronunciation, phonology, suffixes and prefixes. The eastern Slovak dialects are more divergent and form a broader dialect continuum with the Lechitic subgroup of West Slavic, most notably Polish.

The name "Czechoslovak language" is mostly reserved for an official written standard devised in the 19th century that was intended to unify Czech and Slovak. It was proclaimed an official language of Czechoslovakia and functioned de facto as Czech with slight Slovak input.

== History ==
The early Slavic expansion reached Central Europe in the 7th century, and the West Slavic dialects diverged from common Slavic over the following centuries. The West Slavic tribes settled on the eastern fringes of the Carolingian Empire, along the Limes Saxoniae. Prior to the Magyar invasion of Pannonia in the 890s, the West Slavic polity of Great Moravia spanned much of Central Europe between what is now Eastern Germany and Western Romania. In the high medieval period, the West Slavic tribes were again pushed to the east by the incipient German Ostsiedlung, decisively so following the Wendish Crusade in the 11th century.

West Slavic as a group distinct from common Slavic thus emerges during the 7th to 9th centuries. The Czech-Slovak in turn develops as a separate dialect continuum within West Slavic during roughly the 10th to 12th centuries, just predating the first written attestation of the language in the 13th to 14th centuries. The diversification of West Slavic had the characteristic of a dialect continuum. For example, the spirantisation of Slavic /g/ to /h/ is an areal feature shared by the Czech-Slovak group with both Ukrainian and Sorbian (but not with Polish). This innovation appears to have traveled from east to west, and is sometimes attributed to contact with Scytho-Sarmatian. It is approximately dated to the 12th century in Slovak, the 12th to 13th century in Czech and the 14th century in Upper Sorbian.

The Bohemian state was incorporated as the Kingdom of Bohemia in the 13th century. The Slovaks, on the other hand, never became part of the Holy Roman Empire in the medieval period, being incorporated into the Kingdom of Hungary. For this reason, the history of the closely related Czech and Slovak peoples took a significantly different course during the later medieval period, the Czechs being associated with the Holy Roman Empire and the Slovaks being affected by the history of Eastern Europe (the history of Hungary and the Mongol invasion). In the 16th century, however, they were once again united under Habsburg rule, and after the fall of the Habsburg monarchy sharing their own country of Czechoslovakia during 1918–1992.

In the modern period, the spoken language of Bohemia became influenced by the written standard and developed into Common Czech, largely effacing dialectal variation within Bohemia. By contrast, Moravia remained dialectally diverse, with a series of variants intermediate between Czech and Slovak, and are thus sometimes viewed as dialects of Slovak rather than Czech. The Czech–Slovak group was summarized under the term "Bohemian–Moravian–Slovak" (Böhmisch-Mährisch-Slowakisch) in the Austrian census of Cisleithania beginning in the 1880s.

The Czechoslovak language was an attempt to create a single written standard, first proposed during the national revival in the 1830s and the official language of the First Czechoslovak Republic from 1920 to 1938.

In television and radio, Czech and Slovak were used in equal ratios. Since the dissolution of Czechoslovakia in 1993, the Czech and Slovak written standards have been the official languages of the Czech Republic and Slovakia, respectively.

Beginning in the 1990s, a political movement of Moravian linguistic separatism has developed. On the occasion of 2011 Census of the Czech Republic, several Moravian organizations (Moravané and Moravian National Community among others) led a campaign to promote the Moravian nationality and language. The 2011 census recorded 62,908 native speakers of Moravian.

== Varieties ==
The Czech-Slovak dialect continuum historically blended into Silesian in the west and Old Ruthenian (also known as Chancery Slavonic) in the east. With the development of the written standards in the 19th century, it has become less diversified, but there remains a pronounced dialectal division in Moravia. The southeastern Moravian dialects, in particular, are sometimes considered dialects of Slovak rather than Czech, e.g. using the same declension patterns for nouns and pronouns and the same verb conjugations as Slovak.

- Czech language: (since the later 20th century largely standardised, dialectal use is now mostly restricted to older speakers) Common Czech (obecná čeština) is the main vernacular based on the dialect of the Prague region.
  - Nářečí středočeská (Central Bohemian dialects)
  - Nářečí jihozápadočeská (Southwestern Bohemian dialects)
    - Podskupina chodská (Chod subgroup)
    - Podskupina doudlebská (Doudleby subgroup)
  - Nářečí severovýchodočeská (Northeastern Bohemian dialects)
    - Podskupina podkrknošská (Krkonoše subgroup)
    - Teták (Litomyšl) †
  - Moravian dialects (moravština)
    - Bohemian-Moravian (Nářečí českomoravská, transitional to Bohemian Czech)
    - Central Moravian (Hanakian, Nářečí středomoravská)
      - Podskupina tišnovská (Tišnov subgroup)
    - Lach/Silesian (Nářečí slezská, transitional Silesian)
    - Eastern Moravian (Moravian-Slovak, Nářečí východomoravská, transitional to Slovak)
      - Podskupina slovácká (Moravian Slovak subgroup)
      - Podskupina valašská (Moravian Wallachian subgroup)
  - Knaanic language (Judeo-Czech) †
- Slovak language
  - Western Slovak dialects (in Kysuce, Trenčín, Trnava, Nitra, Záhorie)
  - Central Slovak dialects (in Liptov, Orava, Turiec, Tekov, Hont, Novohrad, Gemer and the historic Zvolen county)
  - Lowland (dolnozemské) Slovak dialects (outside Slovakia in the Pannonian Plain in Serbian Vojvodina, and in southeastern Hungary, western Romania, and the Croatian part of Syrmia)
  - Eastern Slovak dialects (in Spiš, Šariš, Zemplín and Abov, transitional to Ruthenian)

In a 1964 textbook on Czech dialectology, Břetislav Koudela used the sentence put the flour from the mill in the cart to highlight phonetic differences between dialects:

Standard Czech:	Dej mouku ze mlýna na vozík.
Standard Slovak:	Daj múku z mlyna na vozík.

== Comparison of written standards ==
The following comparison concerns the contemporary written standards:

Orthography

Slovak graphemes that do not exist in Czech are: ä, ľ, ĺ, ŕ, ô. Czech graphemes that do not exist in Slovak are: ě, ř and ů (see Pronunciation for Czech language and Pronunciation for Slovak language).

Phonology

Slovak has the following phonemes which Czech does not have: /ʎ/, /rː/, /lː/, and the diphthongs /ɪɐ/, /ɪe/, /ɪʊ/, /ʊo/ (also /ɛɐ/ in higher-style standard Slovak, or some dialects); and on the contrary, Czech has /r̝/. Slovak, unlike Czech, uses palatal consonants more frequently (that is, is phonetically "softer"), but there are some exceptions. Slovak de, te, ne are usually pronounced as the Czech dě, tě, ně. The "rhythmic law" in Slovak prohibits two adjacent long syllables.

Grammar

Slovak grammar is somewhat more regular than the grammar of literary Czech, since present-day standard Slovak was not codified until the 19th century. The two languages have differences in declension and conjugation endings and paradigms (e.g. Slovak -cia, -ej, -dlo, -ť, -ov, -om, -mi – Czech -c(i)e, -é, -tko, -t, -ů, -em, y). Slovak does not commonly use the vocative case, while the Czech vocative is still very much alive. Slovak uses the passive voice formed as in English less than Czech, and prefers the passive voice formed using the reflexive pronoun sa (as in East Slavic languages) instead.

Lexicon

Lexical differences are mostly of simple historical origin. As for professional terminology, except for biology (esp. all names of animals and plants), the Czech terminology was mostly taken over (in Slovakised form) for practical reasons. The Czech-Slovak Dictionary of Different Terms (1989, Prague) contains some 11,000 entries (without professional terminology):

Examples of basic different words
English	Slovak	Czech
yeah	hej	jo
if	ak	jestli, jestliže, -li
really, actually	naozaj	opravdu
just, only	iba, len	pouze, jenom, jen
to like	páčiť sa	líbit se
as well	tiež	také, taky, (less commonly) též
but	veď	vždyť
hot	horúci	horký
let, may	nech	ať, nechť
to wish	želať	přát
to see	zbadať	spatřit
next to	pri, popri, vedľa	vedle
cemetery	cintorín	hřbitov
especially	najmä	především, obzvlášť, zejména
to forgive, to excuse	prepáčiť	prominout
apart from, besides	okrem	kromě, mimo, vyjma
operation (of machine)	prevádzka	provoz, chod
traffic	premávka	provoz
war	vojna	válka, (less commonly) vojna
current	terajší	stávající
bad	zlý	špatný
worse (adv.)	horšie	hůř
to go	ísť	jet, jít
as soon as	len čo	jakmile
to forget	zabudnúť	zapomenout
once	raz	jednou
next	budúci	příští
ball	lopta	míč
button	gombík	knoflík
pub	krčma	hospoda
stamp	pečiatka	razítko
room	izba	pokoj
to acquire	nadobudnúť	nabýt
behaviour	správanie	chování
to listen	počuť	slyšet
to watch (TV)	pozerať (televíziu)	dívat se na (televizi)
to look	pozerať	koukat
to look like	vyzerať	vypadat
to say, to speak	povedať, vravieť	říct, mluvit
pocket	vrecko	kapsa
to clean up	upratovať	uklízet
because	keďže	jelikož
surname	priezvisko	příjmení
cellar	pivnica	sklep
including	vrátane	včetně
autumn	jeseň	podzim
be called (as in name),	volať sa	jmenovat se
boy	chalan	kluk
girl	dievča	holka, děvče
breakfast	raňajky	snídaně
to count	rátať, počítať	počítat
snack	olovrant	svačina
to clug, to stuff	pchať	cpát
laundry	bielizeň	prádlo
press, newspaper	tlač	tisk
although	hoci	ačkoliv
pillow	vankúš	polštář
that is	čiže	čili
thirst	smäd	žízeň
strike (of employees)	štrajk	stávka
bet, wager, stake	stávka	sázka
race	preteky	závod
Good bye	dovidenia	na shledanou
cat	mačka	kočka
blackbird	drozd	kos
to kiss	bozkať	líbat
now	teraz	teď, nyní
goods	tovar	zboží
potatoes	zemiaky	brambory
trap	klepec, pasca	past, léčka
the same, equal	rovnaký	stejný
dishes	riad	nádobí
tissue, handkerchief	vreckovka	kapesník
be surprised, wonder	čudovať sa	divit se
pencil	ceruzka	tužka
perhaps	azda, vari, snáď	snad
easy	ľahký	snadný, lehký
trouble	ťažkosť	potíž, nesnáz
baggage	batožina	zavazadlo
branch	konár	větev
to meet	stretnúť sa	setkat se, potkat
spine	chrbtica	páteř
he/she/it is not	nie je	není
to do, to make	robiť, spraviť	dělat, udělat
to apologize, to excuse	ospravedlniť sa	omluvit se
to smoke	fajčiť	kouřit
whatever	hocičo, voľačo	leccos, cokoliv
blueberry	čučoriedka	borůvka
apricot	marhuľa	meruňka
cabbage	kapusta	zelí
Savoy cabbage	kel	kapusta
legume, pulses	strukoviny	luštěniny
chickpeas	cícer	cizrna
lentils	šošovica	čočka
rye	raž	žito
demand	dopyt	poptávka
offer; supply	ponuka	nabídka
early, soon	skoro, čoskoro	brzy
earlier, sooner	skôr	dřív
late	neskorý, neskoro	pozdní, opožděný, pozdě
later	neskôr	později
suddenly	zrazu	najednou
fairy tale	rozprávka	pohádka
tramway	električka	tramvaj
pork	bravčové	vepřové
mutton	baranina	skopové
breastfeed	dojčiť	kojit
infant	dojča	kojenec
baby	bábätko	miminko
(the) rest (of a group)	zvyšok	zbytek
lips	pery	rty
lipstick	rúž	rtěnka
flock	kŕdeľ	hejno
railway station	(železničná) stanica	nádraží
despite	napriek	navzdory
when	keď	když
glass (of water)	pohár	sklenice, sklenička
pepper	čierne korenie	pepř
ill	chorý	nemocný
illness	choroba	nemoc, (less commonly) choroba
dot	bodka	tečka
wall	múr	zeď
bricklayer	murár	zedník
shoulder	plece	rameno
to heat	kúriť	topit
turtle	korytnačka	želva
camel	ťava	velbloud
even (number)	párny	sudý
odd (number)	nepárny	lichý
finally	napokon, nakoniec	nakonec
butcher	mäsiar	řezník
slim, thin	chudý	hubený
poor	chudobný	chudý
The months of the calendar	Uses Latin names	Uses Slavic names

Examples of words with different meanings: SK topiť (to melt/to drown) (could be same meanings, depends on region) – CZ topit (to heat/to drown), SK kúriť (to heat) – CZ kouřit (to smoke), SK horký (bitter) – CZ horký (hot) but hořký (bitter), SK stávka (stake, bet) – CZ stávka (strike), SK chudý (slim, skinny) – CZ chudý (poor; metaphorically also slim), SK kapusta (cabbage) – CZ kapusta (Savoy cabbage), SK pivnica (cellar) – CZ pivnice (pub), SK syrový (cheesy, of cheese) – CZ syrový (raw, uncooked) but sýrový (of cheese), SK spraviť (to make, to create) – CZ spravit (to repair, to fix). Czech months are of Slavic origin (e.g. říjen), whereas the Slovak months are of Latin origin (e.g. október).

Although most words are in fact different, they are largely similar, being cognates, which makes both languages mutually intelligible to a significant extent; e.g. foreign (SK cudzí – CZ cizí), reason (SK dôvod – CZ důvod), to want (SK chcieť – CZ chtít), to promise (SK sľubovať – CZ slibovat), if (SK keby – CZ kdyby), river (SK rieka – CZ řeka), church (SK kostol – CZ kostel), wedding (SK svadobný – CZ svatební), who (SK kto – CZ kdo), to ask (SK spýtať sa – CZ zeptat se), to fail (SK zlyhať – CZ selhat), almost (SK takmer – CZ téměř), thanks (SK ďakujem, vďaka – CZ děkuju, díky).

== Example text ==
Article 1 of the Universal Declaration of Human Rights in Slovak:

Všetci ľudia sa rodia slobodní a rovní v dôstojnosti aj právach. Sú obdarení rozumom a svedomím a majú sa k sebe správať v duchu bratstva.

Article 1 of the Universal Declaration of Human Rights in Czech (adjusted to Slovak translation):

Všichni lidé se rodí svobodní a rovní v důstojnosti i právech. Jsou obdařeni rozumem a svědomím a mají se k sobě chovat v duchu bratrství.

Article 1 of the Universal Declaration of Human Rights in English:

All human beings are born free and equal in dignity and rights. They are endowed with reason and conscience and should act towards one another in a spirit of brotherhood.

== See also ==
- West Slavic languages
- History of the Czech language
- History of the Slovak language
- Czechoslovak language
