= Modra (surname) =

Modra is a surname. Notable people with the surname include:

- Kerry Modra (born 1973), Australian Paralympic tandem cycling pilot, wife of Kieran
- Kieran Modra (1972–2019), Australian Paralympic swimmer and cyclist
- Rob Modra (born 1972), Australian darts player
- Tania Modra (born 1975), Australian Paralympic tandem cycling pilot
- Tony Modra (born 1969), Australian footballer

== See also ==
- Modrá, feminine form or the Cech surname Modrý
