= Modra, Sanski Most =

Modra
- Village
- Location within Bosnia and Herzegovina
- Coordinates: 44.826037°N 16.466039°E
- Country: Bosnia and Herzegovina
- Entity: Federation of Bosnia and Herzegovina
- Canton: Una-Sana
- Municipality: Sanski Most

Area
  - Total: 1.44 sq mi (3.72 km^{2})

Population (2013)
  - Total: 595
  - Density: 414/sq mi (160/km^{2})
- Time zone: UTC+1 (CET)
  - Summer (DST): UTC+2 (CEST)

Modra is a village in the municipality of Sanski Most, Federation of Bosnia and Herzegovina, Bosnia and Herzegovina.

== Demographics ==
According to the 2013 census, its population was 595, all Bosniaks.
