= Šariš =

Region of northeast Slovakia

Coordinates: 49.0017°N 21.2400°E

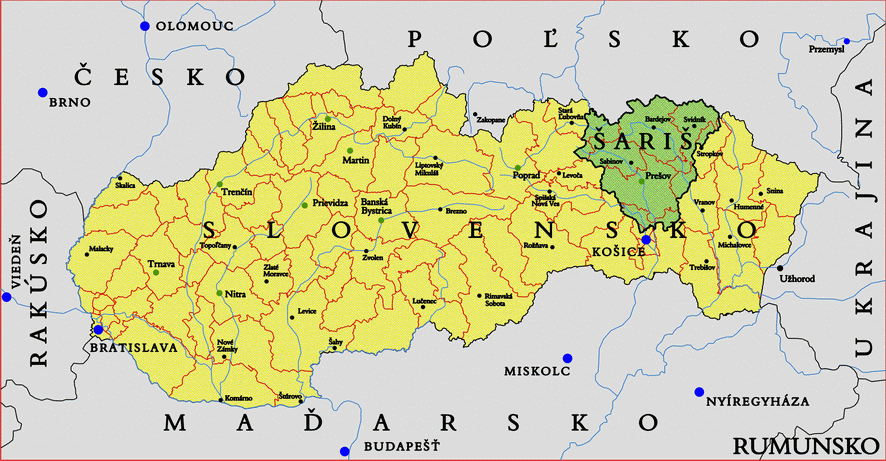
Location of Šariš within Slovakia

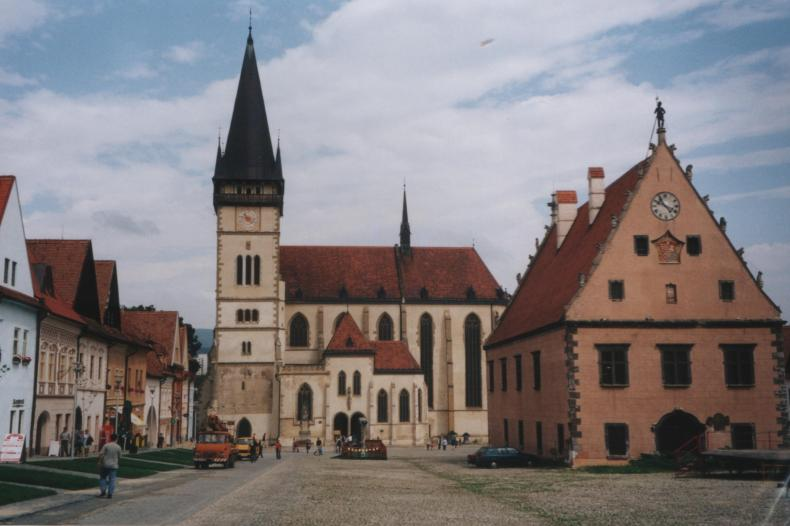
Town Hall Square (Bardejov)

Šariš is the traditional name of a region situated in northeastern Slovakia. It encompasses the territory of the former (comitatus) Sáros county.

== History ==
Šariš county was created in the 13th century from the comitatus Novi Castri (named after Novum Castrum, today Abaújvár), which also included the territories of the later counties of Abaúj and Heves. The county's territory was situated along Torysa and upper Topľa rivers. Its area was 3,652 km^{2} (1,410 sq mi) around 1910. The original seat of the county was Šariš Castle and since the 17th century, Prešov.

== Geography ==
Šariš region is one of the 21 Slovakia's official tourist regions, however, it isn't an administrative region unlike its predecessor. Today, the region is mostly in the Prešov Region, fully including Prešov, Sabinov, and Bardejov districts, and partly including Stará Ľubovňa, Kežmarok, Vranov nad Topľou, Svidník and Stropkov districts. A small part of the region is located in the Košice Region, with Košice-okolie, and very small parts of Košice I and Gelnica districts. Major towns in the region include Prešov, Bardejov and Svidník.
