= Zemplín (region) =

Region in eastern Slovakia

Coordinates: 48.7°N 21.8°E

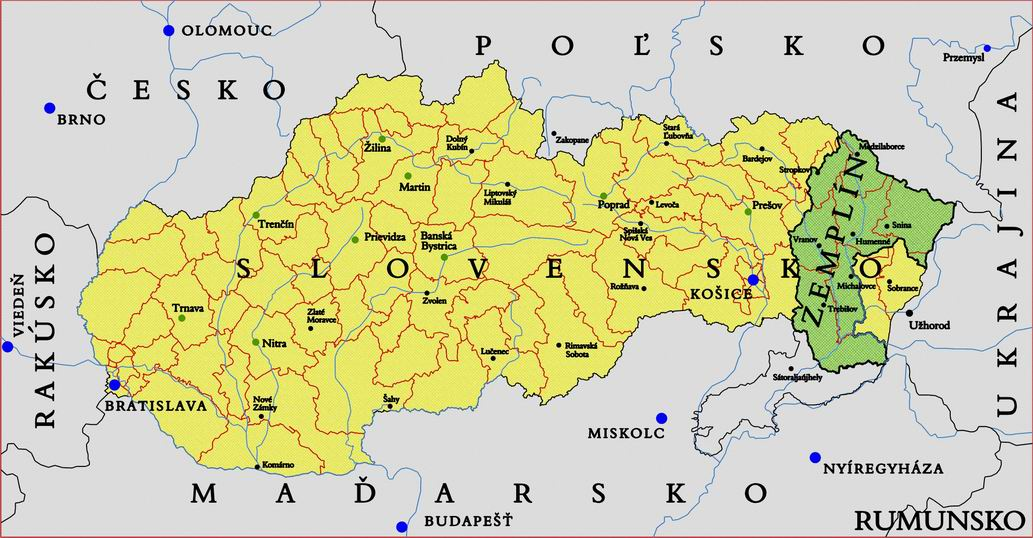
Location of Zemplín within Slovakia

Zemplín is the name of an informal traditional region located in eastern Slovakia. It includes the Slovak part of the former Zemplén county, often including the Slovak part of the Ung county (Slovak: Užská župa/Užský komitát).

== Geography ==
Zemplín region stretches from the Carpathian Mountains in the north to the lowest point in Slovakia at 94 meters (308 ft) AMSL. The region is situated in the easternmost part of Slovakia (except for the region between Vihorlatské vrchy and the Latorica river, if the former territory of Ung county is not included). Rivers in the region include: Bodrog, Laborec, Latorica, Uzh, Ondava and a small part of the Tisza river.

Zemplín is no longer an administrative region, but is divided between two of the 21 official tourism regions, Lower Zemplín and Upper Zemplín. Administratively, the region is divided between Košice Region, which includes Trebišov and the western part of Michalovce District (if Ung county is included, eastern part of Michalovce and whole Sobrance District also belong to Zemplín), and Prešov Region, fully including Humenné, Snina and Medzilaborce districts and from bigger part including Vranov nad Topľou and Stropkov districts. Major towns include Michalovce, Trebišov and Humenné.

== History ==
The region of Zemplín, administered from Zemplín Castle was already an administrative unit of Great Moravia in the 9th century CE. After its integration into the Kingdom of Hungary, it became known as the Zemplén county.

Between 1879 and 1901 over 32,000 persons emigrated from the Slovak districts of Zemplín to the USA.

In 1918 the Slovak part of Zemplín became part of newly formed Czechoslovakia. The southern half (including the bigger part of the divided Sátoraljaújhely) stayed in Hungary as the county Zemplén.

During World War II, when Czechoslovakia was split temporarily, some of the Czechoslovak part of Zemplen county was occupied by Hungary under the First Vienna Award, and added to the counties Zemplén and Ung. After World War II, the pre-war border was restored, and the Hungarian county Zemplén merged with the county Borsod and the Hungarian part of Abov-Turňa to form the present Borsod-Abaúj-Zemplén county. Since the separation of Czechoslovakia into Slovakia and the Czech Republic in 1993, the northern part of Zemplín is part of Slovakia, divided between eastern parts of Košice Region and Prešov Region.
