= Horné Turovce =

Village and municipality in Slovakia

Horné Turovce Felsőtúr
- Municipality
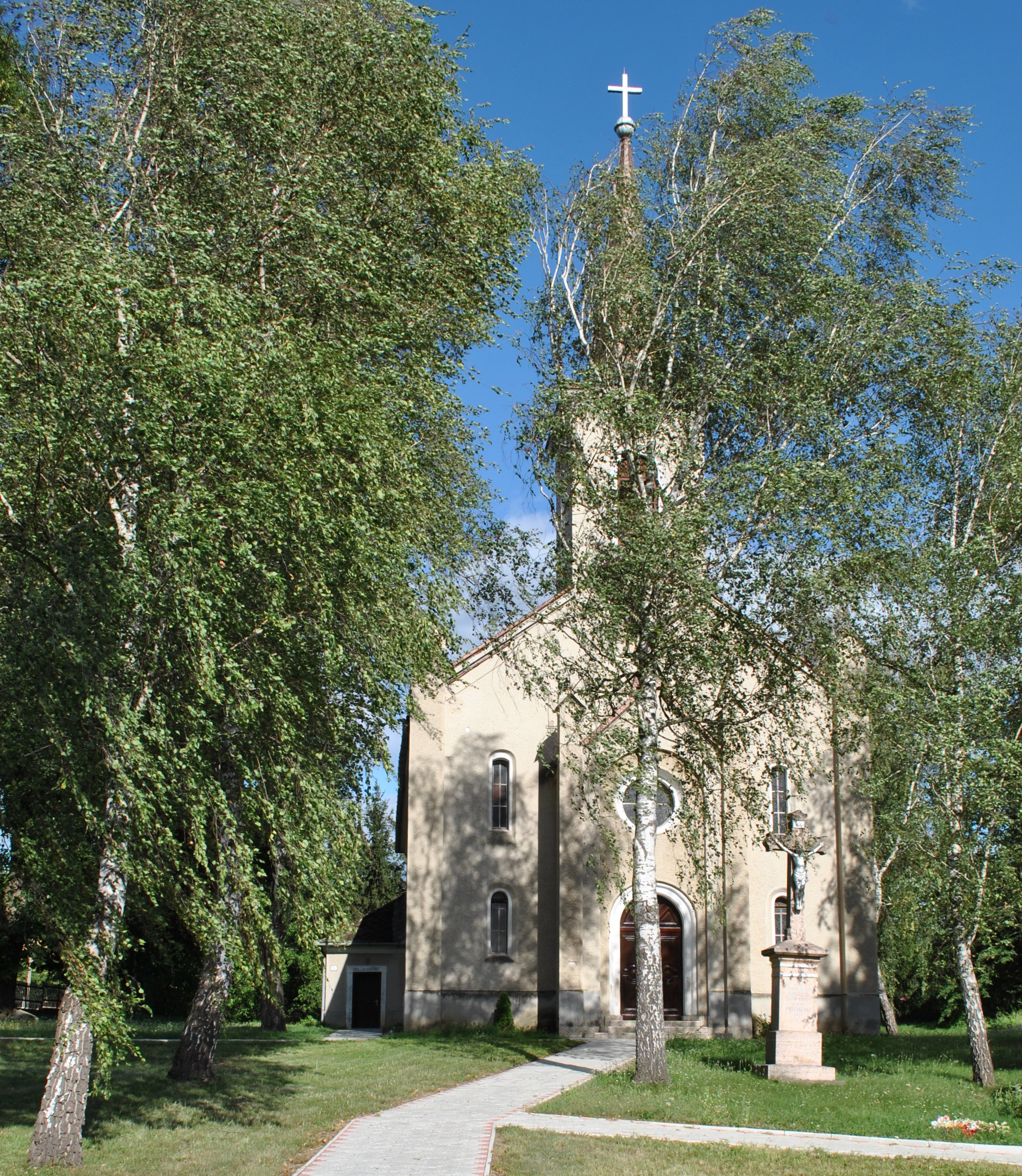

- Flag Coat of arms

- Location of Horné Turovce in the Nitra Region Location of Horné Turovce in Slovakia
- Coordinates: 48.13°N 18.95°E
- Country: Slovakia
- Region: Nitra Region
- District: Levice District
- First mentioned: 1435

Area
  - Total: 12.96 km^{2} (5.00 sq mi)
- Elevation: 143 m (469 ft)

Population (2025)
  - Total: 556
- Time zone: UTC+1 (CET)
  - Summer (DST): UTC+2 (CEST)
- Postal code: 935 81
- Area code: +421 36
- Vehicle registration plate (until 2022): LV
- Website: www.horneturovce.sk

Horné Turovce (Hungarian: Felsőtúr) is a village and municipality in the Levice District in the Nitra Region of Slovakia.

== History ==
In historical records the village was first mentioned in 1156.

== Geography ==
The municipality lies at an altitude of 143 metres (469 ft) and covers an area of 12.96 km^{2} (5.00 sq mi) (2025).

== Population ==
Population statistic (10 years)
Year	1995	2005	2015	2025
Count	634	588	603	556
Difference		−7.25%	+2.55%	−7.79%

Population statistic
Year	2024	2025
Count	558	556
Difference		−0.35%

It has a population of 556 people (31 December 2025).

=== Ethnicity ===
Census 2021 (1+ %)
Ethnicity	Number	Fraction
Hungarian	352	62.08%
Slovak	234	41.26%
Not found out	15	2.64%
Total	567	

In year 2021 was 567 people by ethnicity 352 as Hungarian, 234 as Slovak, 15 as Not found out, 4 as Romani and 1 as Russian.

Note on population: The difference values of population numbers in the table "Population statistic" and in the sections "Ethnicity" & "Religion" is caused by the use of various statistical methods.

=== Religion ===
Census 2021 (1+ %)
Religion	Number	Fraction
Roman Catholic Church	483	85.19%
None	38	6.7%
Not found out	15	2.65%
Evangelical Church	13	2.29%
Calvinist Church	8	1.41%
Total	567	

In year 2021 was 567 people by religion 483 from Roman Catholic Church, 38 from None, 15 from Not found out, 13 from Evangelical Church, 8 from Calvinist Church, 3 from Greek Catholic Church, 3 from Ad hoc movements, 2 from Other, 1 from Paganism and natural spirituality and 1 from Christian Congregations in Slovakia.

== Facilities ==
The village has a public library and a football pitch.

== Genealogical resources ==
The records for genealogical research are available at the state archive "Statny Archiv in Banska Bystrica, Nitra, Slovakia"

- Roman Catholic church records (births/marriages/deaths): 1752-1895 (parish A)

== See also ==
- List of municipalities and towns in Slovakia
