= Bajka, Levice District =

Village and municipality in Slovakia

Bajka Bajka
- Municipality
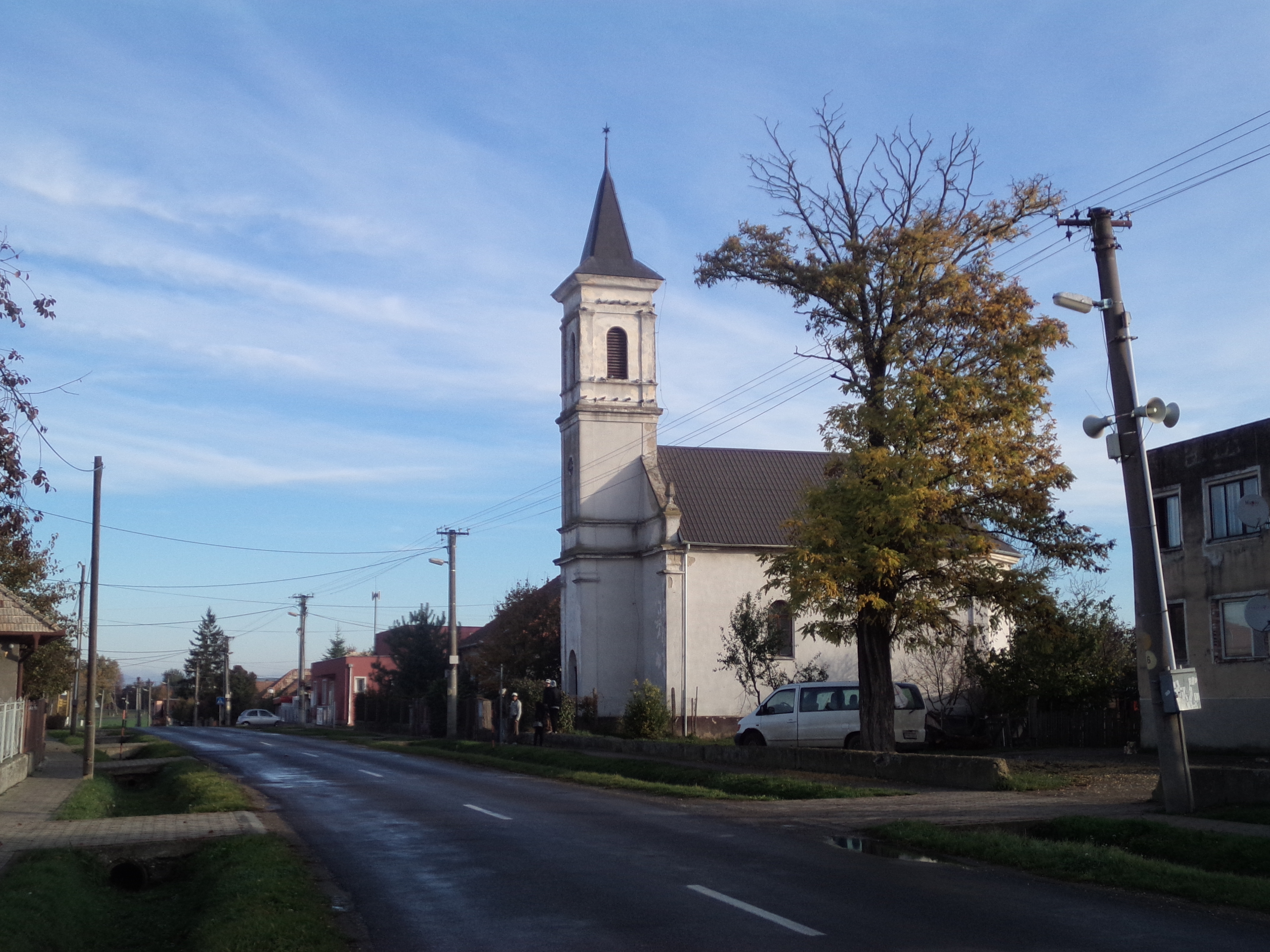
- Church in Bajka

- Flag

- Location of Bajka in the Nitra Region Location of Bajka in Slovakia
- Coordinates: 48°09′N 18°31′E
- Country: Slovakia
- Region: Nitra Region
- District: Levice District
- First mentioned: 1286

Area
  - Total: 5.75 km^{2} (2.22 sq mi)
- Elevation: 161 m (528 ft)

Population (2025)
  - Total: 330
- Time zone: UTC+1 (CET)
  - Summer (DST): UTC+2 (CEST)
- Postal code: 935 51
- Area code: +421 36
- Vehicle registration plate (until 2022): LV

Bajka (Hungarian: Bajka, pronounced [ˈbɒjkɒ]) is a village and municipality in the Levice District in the Nitra Region of Slovakia.

== History ==
In historical records the village was first mentioned in 1286.

== Geography ==
The municipality lies at an altitude of 161 metres (528 ft) and covers an area of 5.75 km^{2} (2.22 sq mi) (2025).

== Population ==
Population statistic (10 years)
Year	1995	2005	2015	2025
Count	326	346	319	330
Difference		+6.13%	−7.80%	+3.44%

Population statistic
Year	2024	2025
Count	332	330
Difference		−0.60%

It has a population of 330 people (31 December 2025).

=== Ethnicity ===
Census 2021 (1+ %)
Ethnicity	Number	Fraction
Slovak	271	82.62%
Hungarian	37	11.28%
Not found out	32	9.75%
Total	328	

In year 2021 was 328 people by ethnicity 271 as Slovak, 37 as Hungarian, 32 as Not found out, 2 as Czech and 1 as French.

Note on population: The difference values of population numbers in the table "Population statistic" and in the sections "Ethnicity" & "Religion" is caused by the use of various statistical methods.

=== Religion ===
Census 2021 (1+ %)
Religion	Number	Fraction
Roman Catholic Church	141	42.99%
None	85	25.91%
Not found out	61	18.6%
Evangelical Church	13	3.96%
Calvinist Church	10	3.05%
Greek Catholic Church	8	2.44%
Jehovah's Witnesses	6	1.83%
Total	328	

In year 2021 was 328 people by religion 141 from Roman Catholic Church, 85 from None, 61 from Not found out, 13 from Evangelical Church, 10 from Calvinist Church, 8 from Greek Catholic Church, 6 from Jehovah's Witnesses, 1 from Jewish community, 1 from Paganism and natural spirituality, 1 from Other and 1 from Baptists Church.

== Facilities ==
The village has a public library and a football pitch.

== Genealogical resources ==
The records for genealogical research are available at the state archive in Nitra (Slovak: Štátny archív v Nitre).

- Roman Catholic church records (births/marriages/deaths): 1746–1757, 1779-1897
- Reformated church records (births/marriages/deaths): 1783-1895 (parish A)
- Census records 1869 of Bajka are not available at the state archive.

== See also ==
- List of municipalities and towns in Slovakia
