= Žemliare =

Village and municipality in Slovakia

Žemliare Zsemlér
- Municipality
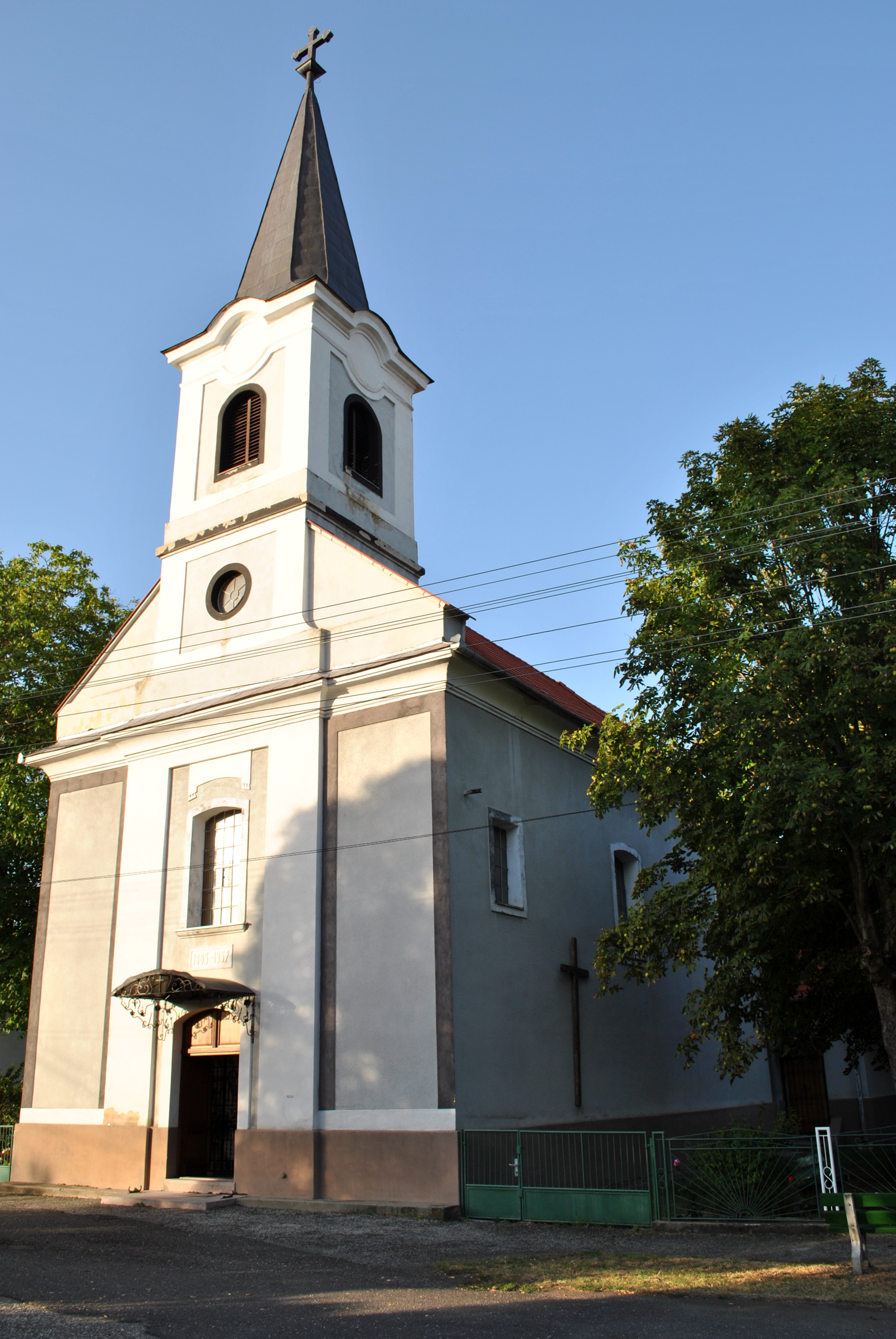
- Church of Saint Ladislaus in Žemliare

- Flag

- Location of Žemliare in the Nitra Region Location of Žemliare in Slovakia
- Coordinates: 48.15°N 18.60°E
- Country: Slovakia
- Region: Nitra Region
- District: Levice District
- First mentioned: 1075

Area
  - Total: 4.43 km^{2} (1.71 sq mi)
- Elevation: 150 m (490 ft)

Population (2025)
  - Total: 158
- Time zone: UTC+1 (CET)
  - Summer (DST): UTC+2 (CEST)
- Postal code: 935 57
- Area code: +421 36
- Vehicle registration plate (until 2022): LV
- Website: www.zemliare.sk

Žemliare (Hungarian: Zsemlér) is a village and municipality in the Levice District in the Nitra Region of Slovakia.

== History ==
In historical records, the village was first mentioned in 1075.

== Geography ==
The municipality lies at an altitude of 150 metres (490 ft) and covers an area of 4.43 km^{2} (1.71 sq mi) (2025).

== Population ==
Population statistic (10 years)
Year	1995	2005	2015	2025
Count	176	157	159	158
Difference		−10.79%	+1.27%	−0.62%

Population statistic
Year	2024	2025
Count	153	158
Difference		+3.26%

It has a population of 158 people (31 December 2025).

=== Ethnicity ===
Census 2021 (1+ %)
Ethnicity	Number	Fraction
Hungarian	90	60%
Slovak	64	42.66%
Not found out	2	1.33%
Total	150	

In year 2021 was 150 people by ethnicity 90 as Hungarian, 64 as Slovak, 2 as Not found out and 1 as Polish.

Note on population: The difference values of population numbers in the table "Population statistic" and in the sections "Ethnicity" & "Religion" is caused by the use of various statistical methods.

=== Religion ===
Census 2021 (1+ %)
Religion	Number	Fraction
Roman Catholic Church	119	79.33%
None	18	12%
Calvinist Church	5	3.33%
Evangelical Church	4	2.67%
Not found out	2	1.33%
Total	150	

In year 2021 was 150 people by religion 119 from Roman Catholic Church, 18 from None, 5 from Calvinist Church, 4 from Evangelical Church, 2 from Not found out, 1 from Other and not ascertained christian church and 1 from Buddhism.

== Facilities ==
The village has a public library and football pitch.
