= Ipeľský Sokolec =

Village and municipality in Slovakia

Ipeľský Sokolec Ipolyszakállos
- Municipality
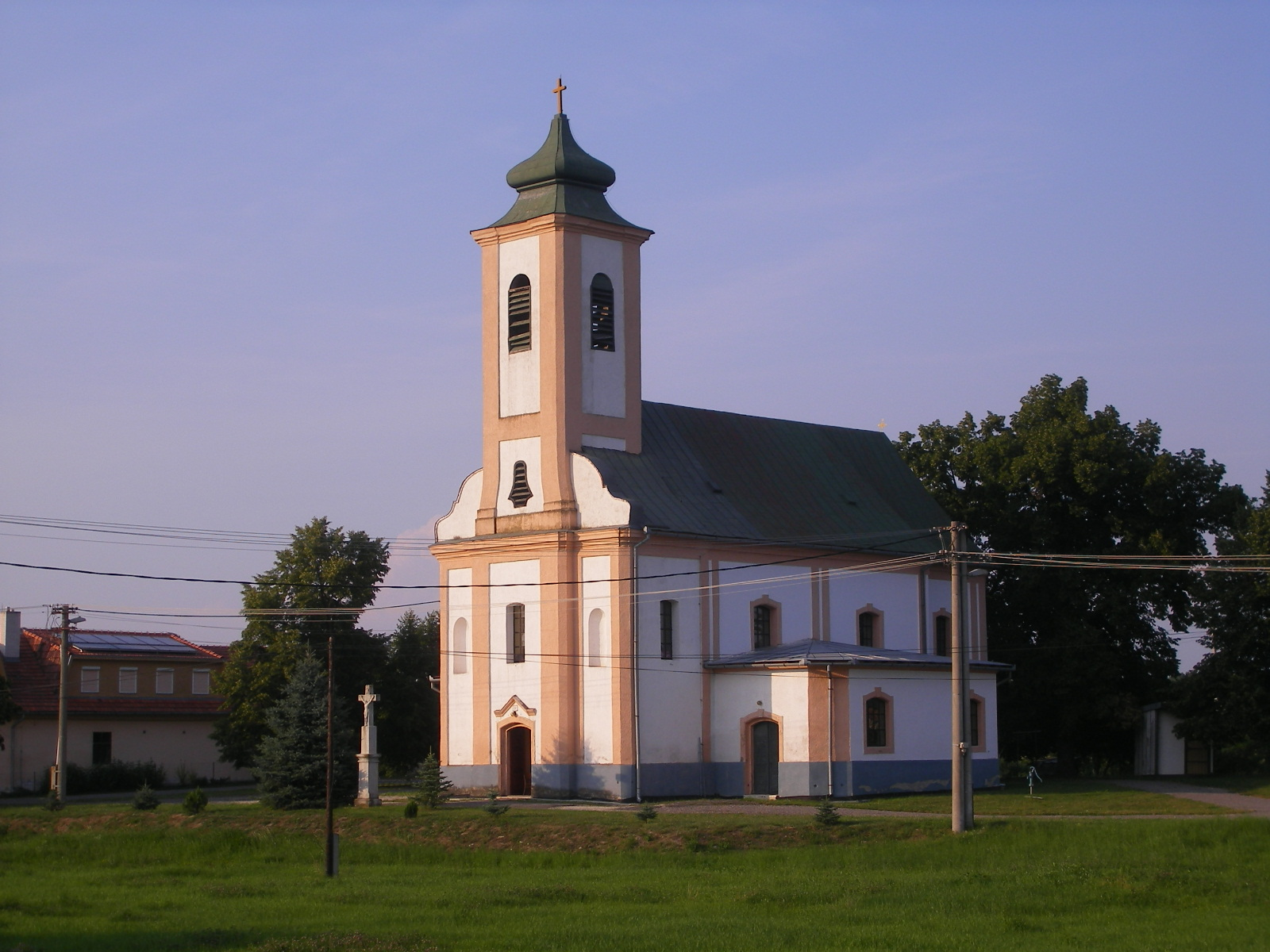
- Church of Christ the King

- Flag Coat of arms

- Location of Ipeľský Sokolec in the Nitra Region Location of Ipeľský Sokolec in Slovakia
- Coordinates: 48.02°N 18.82°E
- Country: Slovakia
- Region: Nitra Region
- District: Levice District
- First mentioned: 1386

Area
  - Total: 17.96 km^{2} (6.93 sq mi)
- Elevation: 119 m (390 ft)

Population (2025)
  - Total: 843
- Time zone: UTC+1 (CET)
  - Summer (DST): UTC+2 (CEST)
- Postal code: 935 75
- Area code: +421 36
- Vehicle registration plate (until 2022): LV
- Website: www.ipelsky-sokolec.sk

Ipeľský Sokolec, formerly Sakáloš (Hungarian: Ipolyszakállos) is a village and municipality in the Levice District in the Nitra Region of Slovakia.

== History ==
In historical records the village was first mentioned in 1386.

== Geography ==
The municipality lies at an altitude of 119 metres (390 ft) and covers an area of 17.96 km^{2} (6.93 sq mi) (2025).

== Population ==
Population statistic (10 years)
Year	1995	2005	2015	2025
Count	909	875	847	843
Difference		−3.74%	−3.2%	−0.47%

Population statistic
Year	2024	2025
Count	817	843
Difference		+3.18%

It has a population of 843 people (31 December 2025).

=== Ethnicity ===
Census 2021 (1+ %)
Ethnicity	Number	Fraction
Hungarian	500	60.31%
Slovak	276	33.29%
Not found out	70	8.44%
Romani	32	3.86%
Total	829	

In year 2021 was 829 people by ethnicity 500 as Hungarian, 276 as Slovak, 70 as Not found out, 32 as Romani, 5 as Czech, 1 as Polish, 1 as Other and 1 as English.

Note on population: The difference values of population numbers in the table "Population statistic" and in the sections "Ethnicity" & "Religion" is caused by the use of various statistical methods.

=== Religion ===
Census 2021 (1+ %)
Religion	Number	Fraction
Roman Catholic Church	604	72.86%
None	94	11.34%
Not found out	50	6.03%
Evangelical Church	44	5.31%
Calvinist Church	18	2.17%
Total	829	

In year 2021 was 829 people by religion 604 from Roman Catholic Church, 94 from None, 50 from Not found out, 44 from Evangelical Church, 18 from Calvinist Church, 7 from Greek Catholic Church, 5 from Jehovah's Witnesses, 5 from Christian Congregations in Slovakia, 1 from Islam and 1 from Ad hoc movements.

== Facilities ==
The village has a public library a gym and soccer pitch.

== Genealogical resources ==
The records for genealogical research are available at the state archive "Statny Archiv in Banska Bystrica, Nitra, Slovakia"

- Roman Catholic church records (births/marriages/deaths): 1714-1896 (parish A)
- Lutheran church records (births/marriages/deaths): 1793-1895 (parish B)
- Reformated church records (births/marriages/deaths): 1833-1895 (parish B)

== See also ==
- List of municipalities and towns in Slovakia
