= Ipeľské Úľany =

Ipeľské Úľany Ipolyfödémes
- Municipality
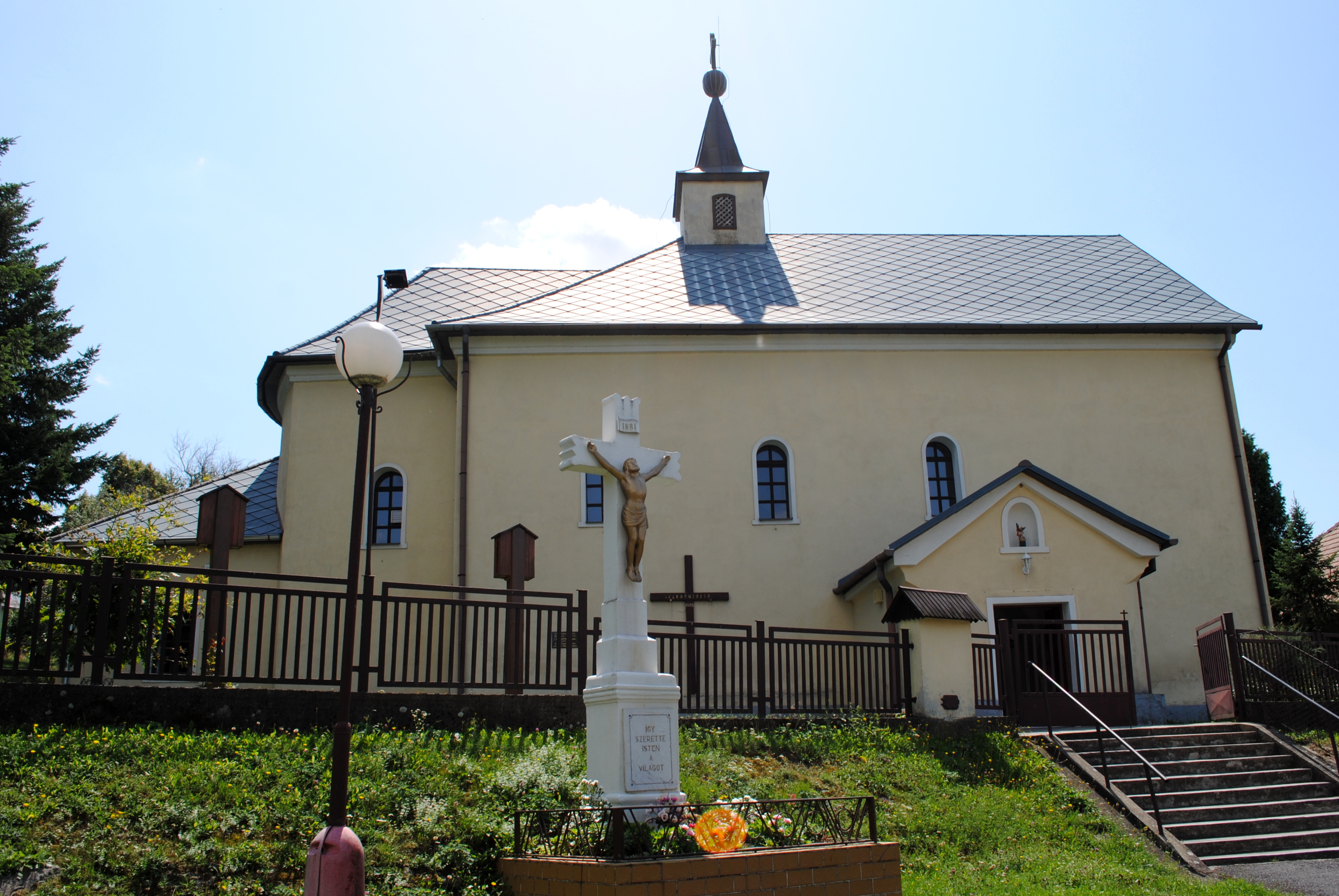
- Church of Saint Michael

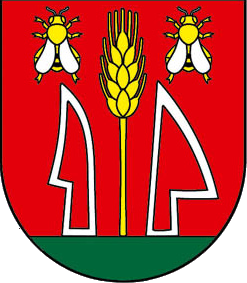
- Flag Coat of arms

- Location of Ipeľské Úľany in the Nitra Region Location of Ipeľské Úľany in Slovakia
- Coordinates: 48.13°N 19.05°E
- Country: Slovakia
- Region: Nitra Region
- District: Levice District
- First mentioned: 1259

Area
  - Total: 15.68 km^{2} (6.05 sq mi)
- Elevation: 332 m (1,089 ft)

Population (2025)
  - Total: 251
- Time zone: UTC+1 (CET)
  - Summer (DST): UTC+2 (CEST)
- Postal code: 935 82
- Area code: +421 36
- Vehicle registration plate (until 2022): LV
- Website: www.ipelskeulany.sk

Ipeľské Úľany, formerly Fedymeš (Hungarian: Ipolyfödémes) is a village and municipality in the Levice District in the Nitra Region of Slovakia.

== History ==
In historical records the village was first mentioned in 1259.

== Geography ==
The municipality lies at an altitude of 332 metres (1,089 ft) and covers an area of 15.68 km^{2} (6.05 sq mi) (2025).

== Population ==
Population statistic (10 years)
Year	1995	2005	2015	2025
Count	407	339	283	251
Difference		−16.70%	−16.51%	−11.30%

Population statistic
Year	2024	2025
Count	262	251
Difference		−4.19%

It has a population of 251 people (31 December 2025).

=== Ethnicity ===
Census 2021 (1+ %)
Ethnicity	Number	Fraction
Hungarian	221	80.65%
Slovak	60	21.89%
Not found out	8	2.91%
Total	274	

In year 2021 was 274 people by ethnicity 221 as Hungarian, 60 as Slovak, 8 as Not found out, 1 as Italian, 1 as Romani, 1 as Polish and 1 as Other.

Note on population: The difference values of population numbers in the table "Population statistic" and in the sections "Ethnicity" & "Religion" is caused by the use of various statistical methods.

=== Religion ===
Census 2021 (1+ %)
Religion	Number	Fraction
Roman Catholic Church	256	93.43%
None	6	2.19%
Greek Catholic Church	5	1.82%
Not found out	4	1.46%
Total	274	

In year 2021 was 274 people by religion 256 from Roman Catholic Church, 6 from None, 5 from Greek Catholic Church, 4 from Not found out, 2 from Other and 1 from Evangelical Church.

== Facilities ==
The village has a public library, grocery shop, gym and a football pitch.

== Genealogical resources ==
The records for genealogical research are available at the state archive "Statny Archiv in Banska Bystrica, Slovakia"

- Roman Catholic church records (births/marriages/deaths): 1788-1894 (parish A)

== See also ==
- List of municipalities and towns in Slovakia
