= Iňa =

Village and municipality in Slovakia

Iňa Ény
- Municipality
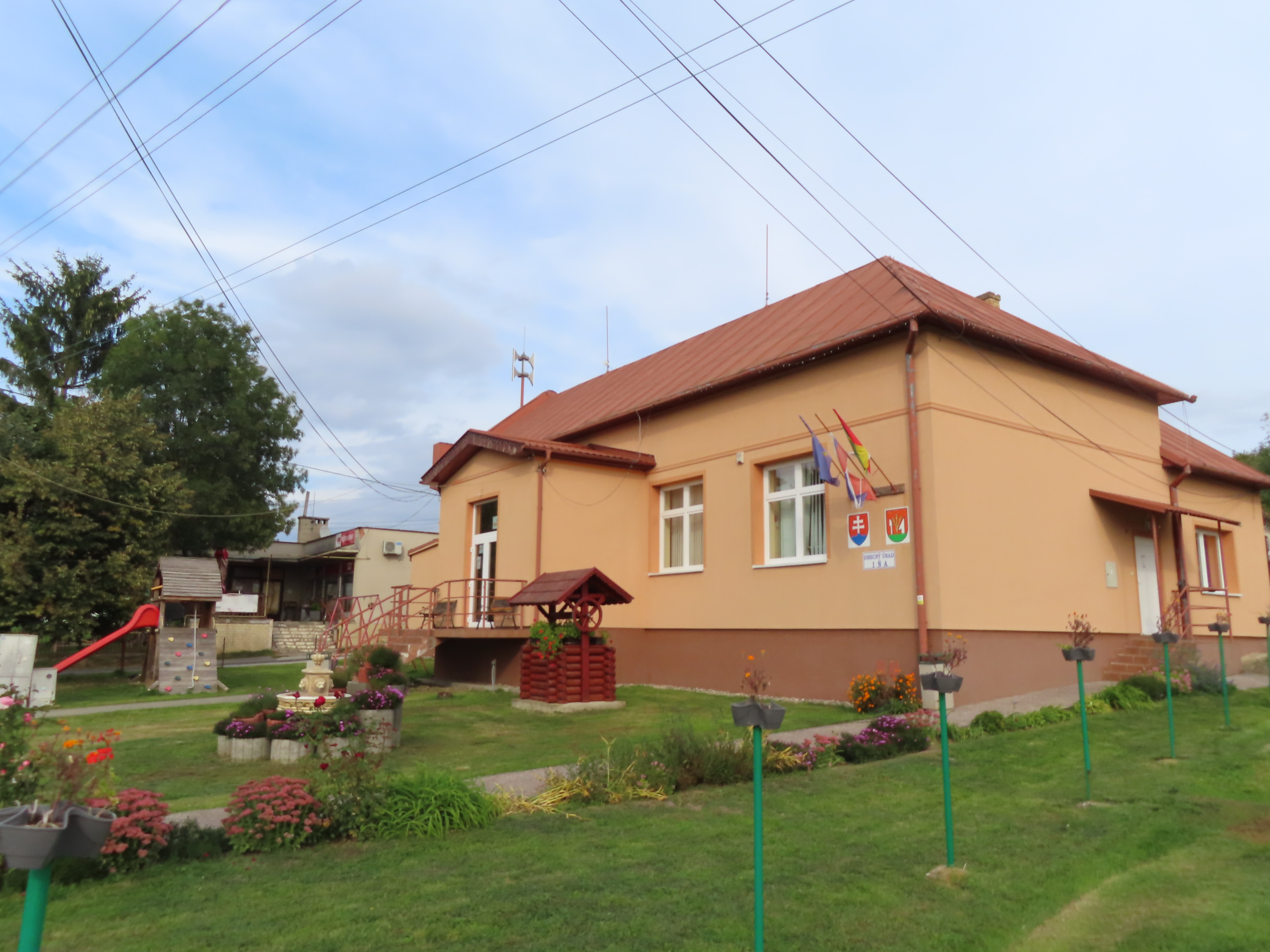
- Municipal office of Iňa

- Flag Coat of arms

- Location of Iňa in the Nitra Region Location of Iňa in Slovakia
- Coordinates: 48.17°N 18.42°E
- Country: Slovakia
- Region: Nitra Region
- District: Levice District
- First mentioned: 1156

Area
  - Total: 5.67 km^{2} (2.19 sq mi)
- Elevation: 171 m (561 ft)

Population (2025)
  - Total: 221
- Time zone: UTC+1 (CET)
  - Summer (DST): UTC+2 (CEST)
- Postal code: 935 35
- Area code: +421 36
- Vehicle registration plate (until 2022): LV
- Website: www.obecina.sk

Iňa (Hungarian: Ény) is a village and municipality in the Levice District in the Nitra Region of Slovakia.

== History ==
In historical records the village was first mentioned in extant historical literature in the year 1156 AD.

== Geography ==
The municipality lies at an altitude of 171 metres (561 ft) and covers an area of 5.67 km^{2} (2.19 sq mi) (2025).

== Population ==
Population statistic (10 years)
Year	1995	2005	2015	2025
Count	228	211	195	221
Difference		−7.45%	−7.58%	+13.33%

Population statistic
Year	2024	2025
Count	225	221
Difference		−1.77%

It has a population of 221 people (31 December 2025).

=== Ethnicity ===
Census 2021 (1+ %)
Ethnicity	Number	Fraction
Slovak	205	89.51%
Not found out	14	6.11%
Hungarian	8	3.49%
Czech	3	1.31%
Other	3	1.31%
Total	229	

In year 2021 was 229 people by ethnicity 205 as Slovak, 14 as Not found out, 8 as Hungarian, 3 as Czech and 3 as Other.

Note on population: The difference values of population numbers in the table "Population statistic" and in the sections "Ethnicity" & "Religion" is caused by the use of various statistical methods.

=== Religion ===
Census 2021 (1+ %)
Religion	Number	Fraction
Roman Catholic Church	136	59.39%
None	68	29.69%
Not found out	13	5.68%
Evangelical Church	10	4.37%
Total	229	

In year 2021 was 229 people by religion 136 from Roman Catholic Church, 68 from None, 13 from Not found out, 10 from Evangelical Church, 1 from Calvinist Church and 1 from Other and not ascertained christian church.

== Facilities ==
The village has a public library.

== Genealogical resources ==
The records for genealogical research are available at the state archive "Statny Archiv in Nitra, Slovakia"

- Roman Catholic church records (births/marriages/deaths): 1733-1895 (parish B)
- Reformated church records (births/marriages/deaths): 1784-1895 (parish B)

== See also ==
- List of municipalities and towns in Slovakia
