= Malé Ludince =

Malé Ludince Kisölved
- Municipality
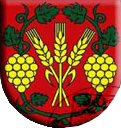
- Flag Coat of arms

- Location of Malé Ludince in the Nitra Region Location of Malé Ludince in Slovakia
- Coordinates: 47.98°N 18.70°E
- Country: Slovakia
- Region: Nitra Region
- District: Levice District
- First mentioned: 1293

Government
  - Mayor: Beata Csenger

Area
  - Total: 6.80 km^{2} (2.63 sq mi)
- Elevation: 132 m (433 ft)

Population (2025)
  - Total: 172
- Time zone: UTC+1 (CET)
  - Summer (DST): UTC+2 (CEST)
- Postal code: 937 01
- Area code: +421 36
- Vehicle registration plate (until 2022): LV
- Website: www.maleludince.sk

Malé Ludince (Hungarian: Kisölved) is a village and municipality in the Levice District in the Nitra Region of Slovakia.

== History ==
In historical records the village was first mentioned in 1293.

== Geography ==
The municipality lies at an altitude of 132 metres (433 ft) and covers an area of 6.80 km^{2} (2.63 sq mi) (2025).

== Population ==
Population statistic (10 years)
Year	1995	2005	2015	2025
Count	215	198	177	172
Difference		−7.90%	−10.60%	−2.82%

Population statistic
Year	2024	2025
Count	170	172
Difference		+1.17%

It has a population of 172 people (31 December 2025).

=== Ethnicity ===
Census 2021 (1+ %)
Ethnicity	Number	Fraction
Hungarian	137	80.58%
Slovak	31	18.23%
Not found out	9	5.29%
Total	170	

In year 2021 was 170 people by ethnicity 137 as Hungarian, 31 as Slovak, 9 as Not found out and 1 as Romani.

Note on population: The difference values of population numbers in the table "Population statistic" and in the sections "Ethnicity" & "Religion" is caused by the use of various statistical methods.

=== Religion ===
Census 2021 (1+ %)
Religion	Number	Fraction
Calvinist Church	90	52.94%
None	38	22.35%
Roman Catholic Church	29	17.06%
Not found out	9	5.29%
Greek Catholic Church	2	1.18%
Total	170	

In year 2021 was 170 people by religion 90 from Calvinist Church, 38 from None, 29 from Roman Catholic Church, 9 from Not found out, 2 from Greek Catholic Church, 1 from Other and 1 from Evangelical Church.

== Facilities ==
The village has a public corner shop, public nursery and a football pitch.
