= Devičany =

Village and municipality in Slovakia

- Municipality
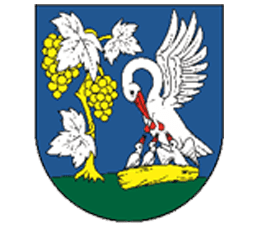
- Flag Coat of arms

- Location of Devičany in the Nitra Region Location of Devičany in Slovakia
- Coordinates: 48.33°N 18.72°E
- Country: Slovakia
- Region: Nitra Region
- District: Levice District
- First mentioned: 1075

Area
  - Total: 29.87 km^{2} (11.53 sq mi)
- Elevation: 276 m (906 ft)

Population (2025)
  - Total: 404
- Time zone: UTC+1 (CET)
  - Summer (DST): UTC+2 (CEST)
- Postal code: 935 04
- Area code: +421 36
- Vehicle registration plate (until 2022): LV
- Website: devicany.sk

Devičany is an old village and municipality in the Levice District in the Nitra Region of Slovakia.

== History ==
In historical records the village was first mentioned in 1075.

== Geography ==
The municipality lies at an altitude of 276 metres (906 ft) and covers an area of 29.87 km^{2} (11.53 sq mi) (2025).

== Population ==
Population statistic (10 years)
Year	1995	2005	2015	2025
Count	424	388	381	404
Difference		−8.49%	−1.80%	+6.03%

Population statistic
Year	2024	2025
Count	401	404
Difference		+0.74%

It has a population of 404 people (31 December 2025).

=== Ethnicity ===
Census 2021 (1+ %)
Ethnicity	Number	Fraction
Slovak	386	94.6%
Not found out	21	5.14%
Czech	7	1.71%
Total	408	

In year 2021 was 408 people by ethnicity 386 as Slovak, 21 as Not found out, 7 as Czech, 2 as Hungarian, 1 as Russian and 1 as Moravian.

Note on population: The difference values of population numbers in the table "Population statistic" and in the sections "Ethnicity" & "Religion" is caused by the use of various statistical methods.

=== Religion ===
Census 2021 (1+ %)
Religion	Number	Fraction
Evangelical Church	198	48.53%
Roman Catholic Church	94	23.04%
None	82	20.1%
Not found out	24	5.88%
Total	408	

In year 2021 was 408 people by religion 198 from Evangelical Church, 94 from Roman Catholic Church, 82 from None, 24 from Not found out, 4 from Greek Catholic Church, 2 from Calvinist Church, 2 from Other and 2 from Ad hoc movements.

== Facilities ==
The village has a public library and a football pitch.

== Genealogical resources ==
The records for genealogical research are available at the state archive "Statny Archiv in Nitra, Slovakia"

- Roman Catholic church records (births/marriages/deaths): 1688-1898 (parish B)
- Lutheran church records (births/marriages/deaths): 1655-1895 (parish A)

== See also ==
- List of municipalities and towns in Slovakia
