= Uhliská =

Village and municipality in Slovakia

Uhliská Bakaszenes
- Municipality
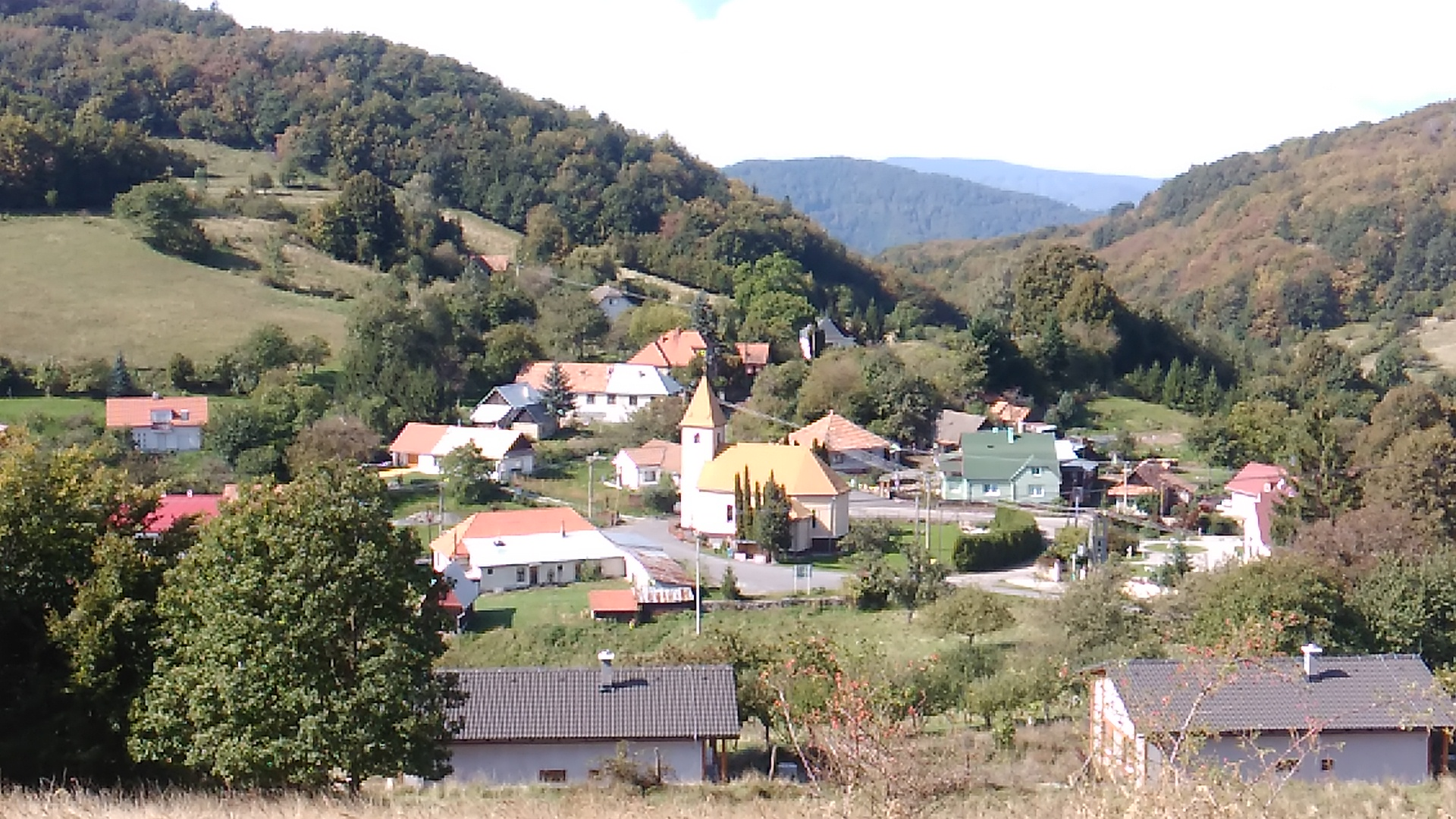
- Panorama of Uhliská

- Location of Uhliská in the Nitra Region Location of Uhliská in Slovakia
- Coordinates: 48.47°N 19.95°E
- Country: Slovakia
- Region: Nitra Region
- District: Levice District
- First mentioned: 1554

Government
  - Mayor: Daniel Štubňa (Independent)

Area
  - Total: 14.09 km^{2} (5.44 sq mi)
- Elevation: 610 m (2,000 ft)

Population (2025)
  - Total: 187
- Time zone: UTC+1 (CET)
  - Summer (DST): UTC+2 (CEST)
- Postal code: 935 05
- Area code: +421 36
- Vehicle registration plate (until 2022): LV
- Website: www.obecuhliska.sk

Uhliská (Hungarian: Bakaszenes) is a village and municipality in the Levice District in the Nitra Region of Slovakia.

== History ==
In historical records the village was first mentioned in 1554.

== Geography ==
The municipality lies at an altitude of 610 metres (2,000 ft) and covers an area of 14.09 km^{2} (5.44 sq mi) (2025).

== Population ==
Population statistic (10 years)
Year	1995	2005	2015	2025
Count	248	212	180	187
Difference		−14.51%	−15.09%	+3.88%

Population statistic
Year	2024	2025
Count	186	187
Difference		+0.53%

It has a population of 187 people (31 December 2025).

=== Ethnicity ===
Census 2021 (1+ %)
Ethnicity	Number	Fraction
Slovak	168	93.33%
Not found out	10	5.55%
German	2	1.11%
Hungarian	2	1.11%
Total	180	

In year 2021 was 180 people by ethnicity 168 as Slovak, 10 as Not found out, 2 as German, 2 as Hungarian and 1 as Czech.

Note on population: The difference values of population numbers in the table "Population statistic" and in the sections "Ethnicity" & "Religion" is caused by the use of various statistical methods.

=== Religion ===
Census 2021 (1+ %)
Religion	Number	Fraction
Roman Catholic Church	138	76.67%
None	22	12.22%
Not found out	10	5.56%
Greek Catholic Church	6	3.33%
Evangelical Church	3	1.67%
Total	180	

In year 2021 was 180 people by religion 138 from Roman Catholic Church, 22 from None, 10 from Not found out, 6 from Greek Catholic Church, 3 from Evangelical Church and 1 from Calvinist Church.

== Facilities ==
The village has a public library.
