= Zalaba =

- Municipality
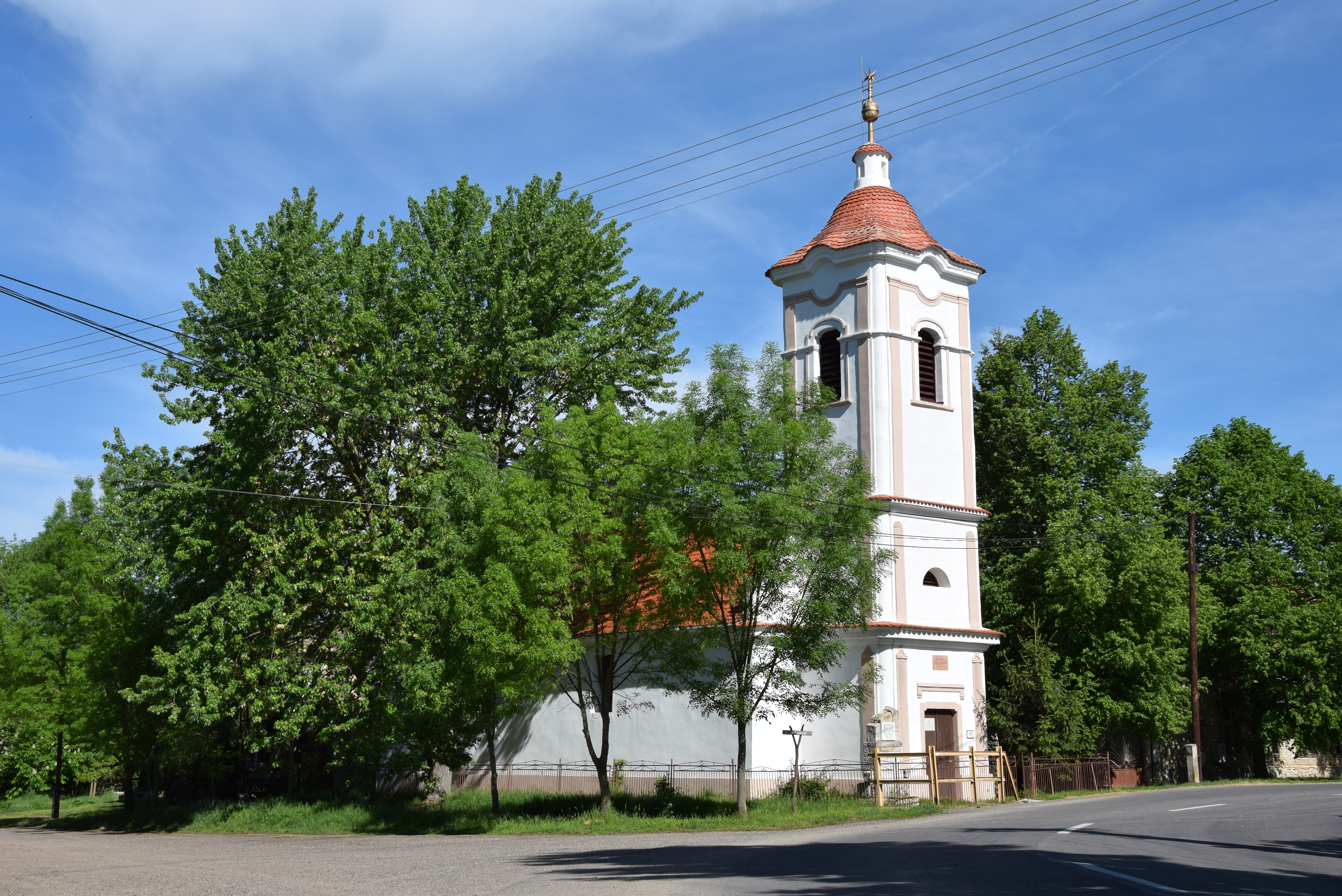
- Reformed church in Zalaba

- Flag

- Location of Zalaba in the Nitra Region Location of Zalaba in Slovakia
- Coordinates: 47.97°N 18.70°E
- Country: Slovakia
- Region: Nitra Region
- District: Levice District
- First mentioned: 1349

Area
  - Total: 7.35 km^{2} (2.84 sq mi)
- Elevation: 125 m (410 ft)

Population (2025)
  - Total: 126
- Time zone: UTC+1 (CET)
  - Summer (DST): UTC+2 (CEST)
- Postal code: 937 01
- Area code: +421 36
- Vehicle registration plate (until 2022): LV
- Website: www.zalaba.sk

Zalaba (Hungarian: Zalaba) is a village and municipality in the Levice District in the Nitra Region of Slovakia.

== History ==
In historical records the village was first mentioned in 1349.

== Geography ==
The municipality lies at an altitude of 125 metres (410 ft) and covers an area of 7.35 km^{2} (2.84 sq mi) (2025).

== Population ==
Population statistic (10 years)
Year	1995	2005	2015	2025
Count	179	165	183	126
Difference		−7.82%	+10.90%	−31.14%

Population statistic
Year	2024	2025
Count	131	126
Difference		−3.81%

It has a population of 126 people (31 December 2025).

=== Ethnicity ===
Census 2021 (1+ %)
Ethnicity	Number	Fraction
Hungarian	118	83.68%
Slovak	26	18.43%
Total	141	

In year 2021 was 141 people by ethnicity 118 as Hungarian, 26 as Slovak and 1 as Not found out.

Note on population: The difference values of population numbers in the table "Population statistic" and in the sections "Ethnicity" & "Religion" is caused by the use of various statistical methods.

=== Religion ===
Census 2021 (1+ %)
Religion	Number	Fraction
Roman Catholic Church	64	45.39%
Calvinist Church	45	31.91%
None	25	17.73%
Evangelical Church	4	2.84%
Greek Catholic Church	2	1.42%
Total	141	

In year 2021 was 141 people by religion 64 from Roman Catholic Church, 45 from Calvinist Church, 25 from None, 4 from Evangelical Church, 2 from Greek Catholic Church and 1 from Not found out.

== Facilities ==
The village has a public library and football pitch.
