= Dolná Seč =

Village and municipality in Slovakia

Dolná Seč Alsószecse
- Municipality
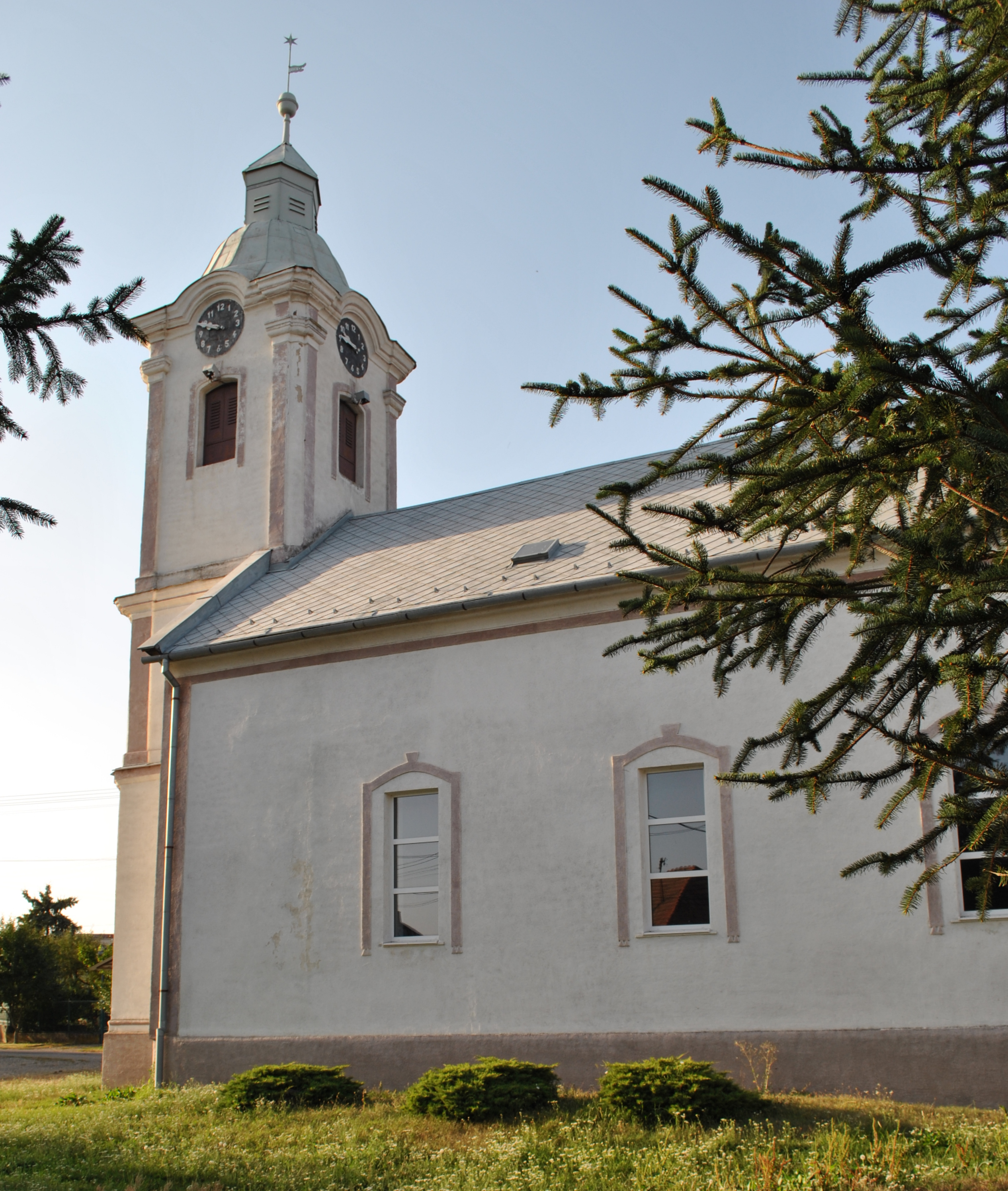
- Reformed Church

- Flag Coat of arms

- Location of Dolná Seč in the Nitra Region Location of Dolná Seč in Slovakia
- Coordinates: 48.17°N 18.57°E
- Country: Slovakia
- Region: Nitra Region
- District: Levice District
- First mentioned: 1310

Area
  - Total: 8.78 km^{2} (3.39 sq mi)
- Elevation: 155 m (509 ft)

Population (2025)
  - Total: 566
- Time zone: UTC+1 (CET)
  - Summer (DST): UTC+2 (CEST)
- Postal code: 935 31
- Area code: +421 36
- Vehicle registration plate (until 2022): LV
- Website: www.dolnasec.sk

Dolná Seč (Hungarian: Alsószecse) is a village and municipality in the Levice District in the Nitra Region of Slovakia.

== History ==
In historical records the village was first mentioned in 1310.

== Geography ==
The municipality lies at an altitude of 155 metres (509 ft) and covers an area of 8.78 km^{2} (3.39 sq mi) (2025).

== Population ==
Population statistic (10 years)
Year	1995	2005	2015	2025
Count	415	447	463	566
Difference		+7.71%	+3.57%	+22.24%

Population statistic
Year	2024	2025
Count	566	566
Difference		+0%

It has a population of 566 people (31 December 2025).

=== Ethnicity ===
Census 2021 (1+ %)
Ethnicity	Number	Fraction
Slovak	469	89.33%
Romani	36	6.85%
Hungarian	31	5.9%
Not found out	25	4.76%
Other	6	1.14%
Total	525	

In year 2021 was 525 people by ethnicity 469 as Slovak, 36 as Romani, 31 as Hungarian, 25 as Not found out, 6 as Other, 3 as Czech, 2 as Canadian, 1 as Italian and 1 as Croatian.

Note on population: The difference values of population numbers in the table "Population statistic" and in the sections "Ethnicity" & "Religion" is caused by the use of various statistical methods.

=== Religion ===
Census 2021 (1+ %)
Religion	Number	Fraction
None	187	35.62%
Roman Catholic Church	159	30.29%
Evangelical Church	79	15.05%
Church of the Brethren	30	5.71%
Not found out	23	4.38%
Calvinist Church	18	3.43%
Jehovah's Witnesses	13	2.48%
Total	525	

In year 2021 was 525 people by religion 187 from None, 159 from Roman Catholic Church, 79 from Evangelical Church, 30 from Church of the Brethren, 23 from Not found out, 18 from Calvinist Church, 13 from Jehovah's Witnesses, 4 from Other and not ascertained christian church, 2 from Other, 2 from Greek Catholic Church, 2 from Buddhism, 2 from Baptists Church, 1 from Paganism and natural spirituality, 1 from Christian Congregations in Slovakia, 1 from Islam and 1 from Ad hoc movements.

== Facilities ==
The village has a public library and a football pitch.

== Genealogical resources ==
The records for genealogical research are available at the state archive "Statny Archiv in Nitra, Slovakia"

- Roman Catholic church records (births/marriages/deaths): 1827-1945 (parish A)

== See also ==
- List of municipalities and towns in Slovakia
