= Vyšné nad Hronom =

Vyšné nad Hronom Nagyod
- Municipality
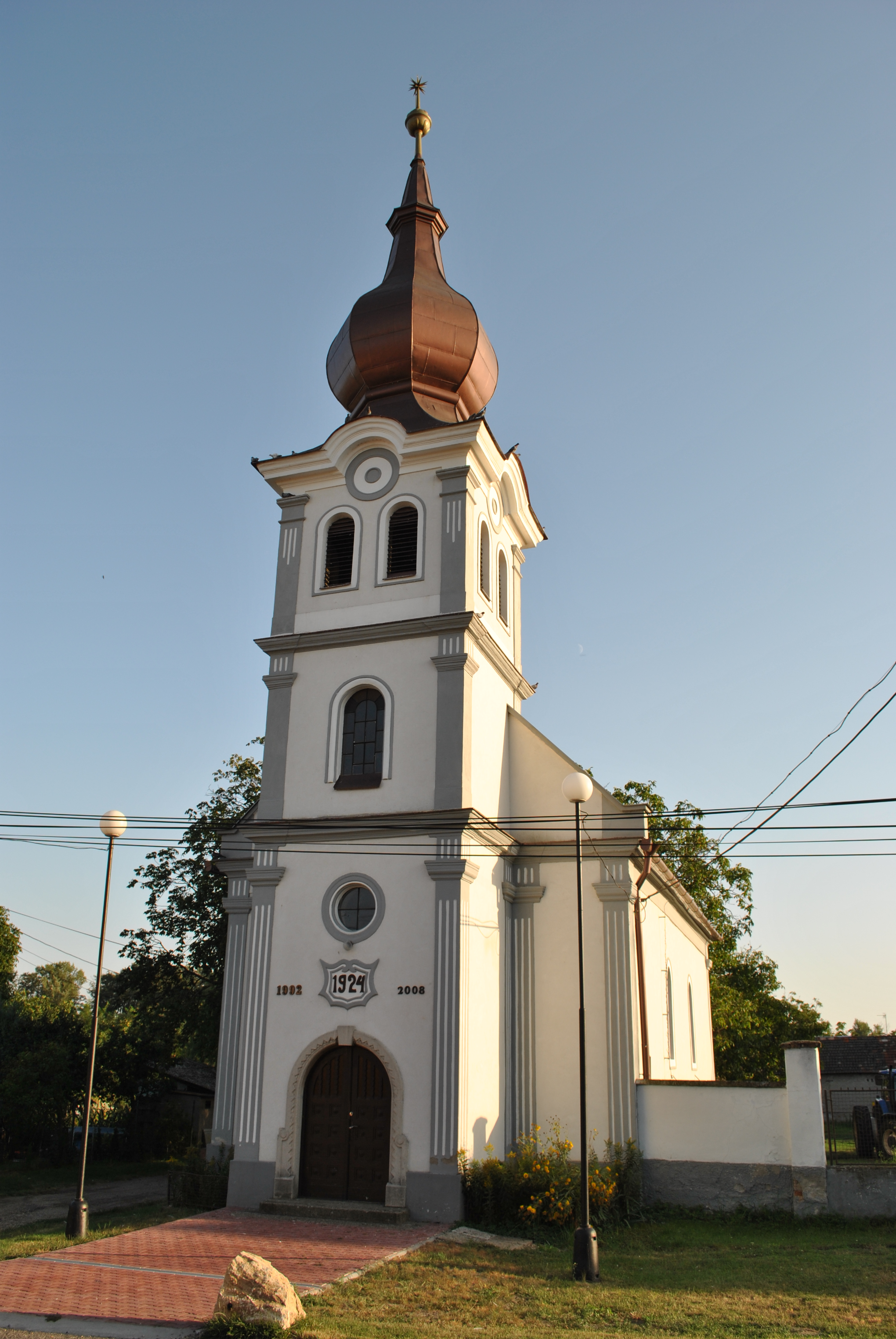
- Reformed church in Vyšné nad Hronom

- Flag

- Location of Vyšné nad Hronom in the Nitra Region Location of Vyšné nad Hronom in Slovakia
- Coordinates: 48.17°N 18.58°E
- Country: Slovakia
- Region: Nitra Region
- District: Levice District
- First mentioned: 1264

Area
  - Total: 6.47 km^{2} (2.50 sq mi)
- Elevation: 153 m (502 ft)

Population (2025)
  - Total: 175
- Time zone: UTC+1 (CET)
  - Summer (DST): UTC+2 (CEST)
- Postal code: 935 31
- Area code: +421 36
- Vehicle registration plate (until 2022): LV
- Website: www.vysnenadhronom.sk

Vyšné nad Hronom (Hungarian: Nagyod) is a village and municipality in the Levice District in the Nitra Region of Slovakia.

== History ==
In historical records the village was first mentioned in 1264.

== Geography ==
The municipality lies at an altitude of 153 metres (502 ft) and covers an area of 6.47 km^{2} (2.50 sq mi) (2025).

== Population ==
Population statistic (10 years)
Year	1995	2005	2015	2025
Count	192	184	185	175
Difference		−4.16%	+0.54%	−5.40%

Population statistic
Year	2024	2025
Count	176	175
Difference		−0.56%

It has a population of 175 people (31 December 2025).

=== Ethnicity ===
Census 2021 (1+ %)
Ethnicity	Number	Fraction
Slovak	92	52.57%
Hungarian	78	44.57%
Not found out	14	8%
Romani	2	1.14%
Total	175	

In year 2021 was 175 people by ethnicity 92 as Slovak, 78 as Hungarian, 14 as Not found out and 2 as Romani.

Note on population: The difference values of population numbers in the table "Population statistic" and in the sections "Ethnicity" & "Religion" is caused by the use of various statistical methods.

=== Religion ===
Census 2021 (1+ %)
Religion	Number	Fraction
None	56	32%
Roman Catholic Church	55	31.43%
Calvinist Church	48	27.43%
Not found out	12	6.86%
Evangelical Church	3	1.71%
Total	175	

In year 2021 was 175 people by religion 56 from None, 55 from Roman Catholic Church, 48 from Calvinist Church, 12 from Not found out, 3 from Evangelical Church and 1 from Church of the Brethren.

== Facilities ==
The village has a public library and football pitch.
