= Starý Hrádok =

Village and municipality in Slovakia

Starý Hrádok Kisóvár
- Municipality
- Flag

- Location of Starý Hrádok in the Nitra Region Location of Starý Hrádok in Slovakia
- Coordinates: 48.15°N 18.63°E
- Country: Slovakia
- Region: Nitra Region
- District: Levice District
- First mentioned: 1239

Area
  - Total: 6.56 km^{2} (2.53 sq mi)
- Elevation: 148 m (486 ft)

Population (2025)
  - Total: 237
- Time zone: UTC+1 (CET)
  - Summer (DST): UTC+2 (CEST)
- Postal code: 935 56
- Area code: +421 36
- Vehicle registration plate (until 2022): LV
- Website: www.staryhradok.sk

Starý Hrádok (Hungarian: Kisóvár) is a village and municipality in the Levice District in the Nitra Region of Slovakia.

== History ==
In historical records the village was first mentioned in 1239.

== Geography ==
The municipality lies at an altitude of 148 metres (486 ft) and covers an area of 6.56 km^{2} (2.53 sq mi) (2025).

== Population ==
Population statistic (10 years)
Year	1995	2005	2015	2025
Count	181	185	187	237
Difference		+2.20%	+1.08%	+26.73%

Population statistic
Year	2024	2025
Count	233	237
Difference		+1.71%

It has a population of 237 people (31 December 2025).

=== Ethnicity ===
Census 2021 (1+ %)
Ethnicity	Number	Fraction
Slovak	173	83.57%
Hungarian	34	16.42%
Russian	4	1.93%
Not found out	3	1.44%
Total	207	

In year 2021 was 207 people by ethnicity 173 as Slovak, 34 as Hungarian, 4 as Russian, 3 as Not found out, 2 as German, 1 as Czech and 1 as Other.

Note on population: The difference values of population numbers in the table "Population statistic" and in the sections "Ethnicity" & "Religion" is caused by the use of various statistical methods.

=== Religion ===
Census 2021 (1+ %)
Religion	Number	Fraction
Roman Catholic Church	77	37.2%
None	55	26.57%
Evangelical Church	29	14.01%
Calvinist Church	16	7.73%
Not found out	13	6.28%
Church of the Brethren	5	2.42%
Other	4	1.93%
Greek Catholic Church	3	1.45%
Total	207	

In year 2021 was 207 people by religion 77 from Roman Catholic Church, 55 from None, 29 from Evangelical Church, 16 from Calvinist Church, 13 from Not found out, 5 from Church of the Brethren, 4 from Other, 3 from Greek Catholic Church, 2 from Christian Congregations in Slovakia, 1 from Other and not ascertained christian church, 1 from Baptists Church and 1 from Ad hoc movements.

== Facilities ==
The village has a public library and tennis court.
