= Kukučínov =

Kukučínov Nemesoroszi
- Municipality
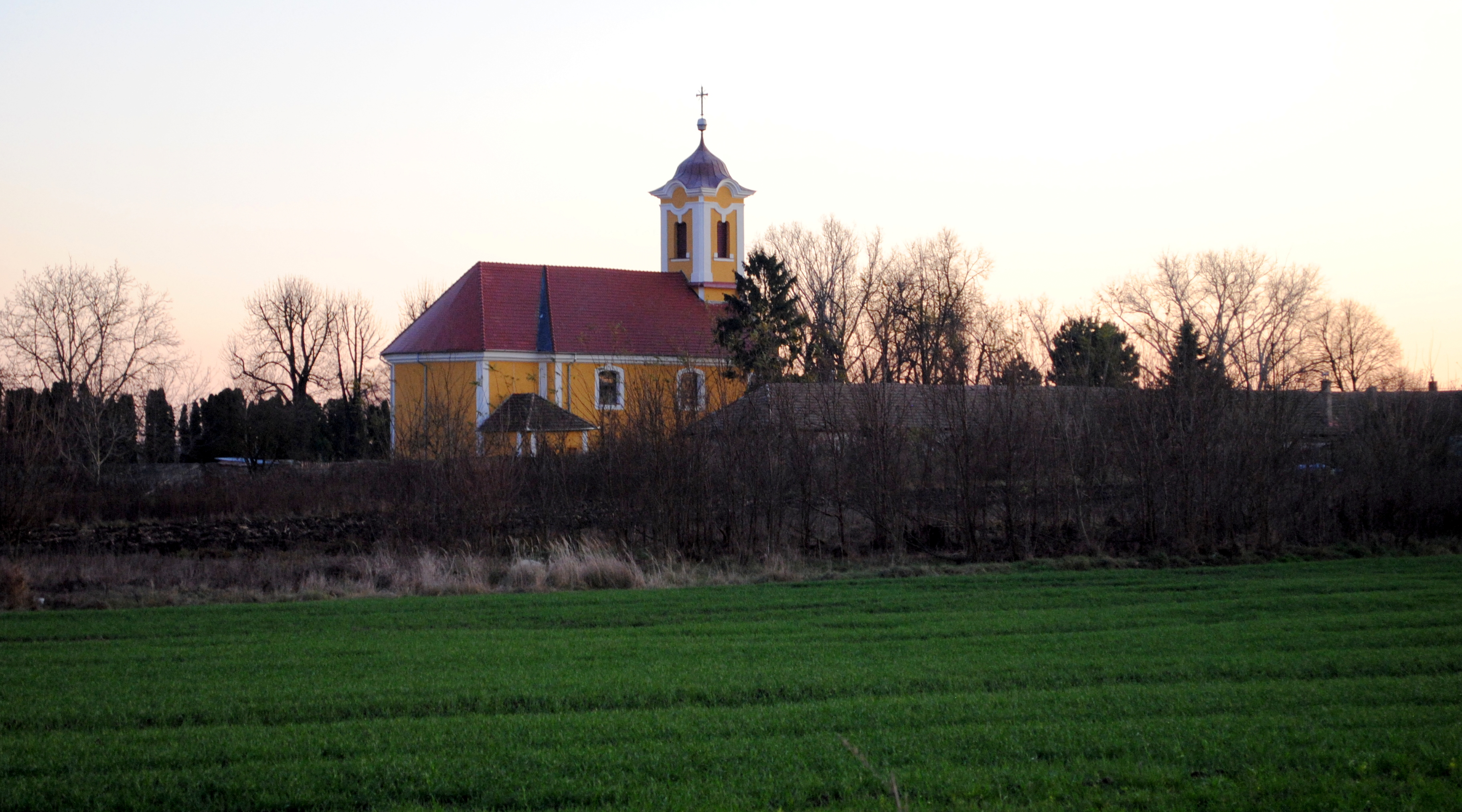
- Our Lady Church in Kukučínov

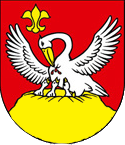
- Flag Coat of arms

- Location of Kukučínov in the Nitra Region Location of Kukučínov in Slovakia
- Coordinates: 48.09°N 18.70°E
- Country: Slovakia
- Region: Nitra Region
- District: Levice District
- First mentioned: 1293

Area
  - Total: 11.30 km^{2} (4.36 sq mi)
- Elevation: 142 m (466 ft)

Population (2025)
  - Total: 564
- Time zone: UTC+1 (CET)
  - Summer (DST): UTC+2 (CEST)
- Postal code: 937 01
- Area code: +421 36
- Vehicle registration plate (until 2022): LV
- Website: www.kukucinov.sk

Kukučínov (Hungarian: Nemesoroszi) is a village and municipality in the Levice District in the Nitra Region of Slovakia.

== History ==
In historical records the village was first mentioned in 1293.

== Geography ==
The municipality lies at an altitude of 142 metres (466 ft) and covers an area of 11.30 km^{2} (4.36 sq mi) (2025).

== Population ==
Population statistic (10 years)
Year	1995	2005	2015	2025
Count	595	590	606	564
Difference		−0.84%	+2.71%	−6.93%

Population statistic
Year	2024	2025
Count	564	564
Difference		+0%

It has a population of 564 people (31 December 2025).

=== Ethnicity ===
Census 2021 (1+ %)
Ethnicity	Number	Fraction
Slovak	423	72.06%
Hungarian	102	17.37%
Not found out	69	11.75%
Czech	6	1.02%
Romani	6	1.02%
Total	587	

In year 2021 was 587 people by ethnicity 423 as Slovak, 102 as Hungarian, 69 as Not found out, 6 as Czech, 6 as Romani, 1 as Italian and 1 as Polish.

Note on population: The difference values of population numbers in the table "Population statistic" and in the sections "Ethnicity" & "Religion" is caused by the use of various statistical methods.

=== Religion ===
Census 2021 (1+ %)
Religion	Number	Fraction
Roman Catholic Church	297	50.6%
None	140	23.85%
Not found out	60	10.22%
Evangelical Church	59	10.05%
Calvinist Church	13	2.21%
Total	587	

In year 2021 was 587 people by religion 297 from Roman Catholic Church, 140 from None, 60 from Not found out, 59 from Evangelical Church, 13 from Calvinist Church, 4 from Greek Catholic Church, 3 from Jehovah's Witnesses, 3 from Islam, 3 from Seventh-day Adventist Church, 2 from Other and not ascertained christian church, 1 from Old Catholic Church, 1 from Christian Congregations in Slovakia and 1 from Apostolic Church.

== Facilities ==
The village has a public library and football pitch.
