= Nová Dedina =

Village and municipality in Slovakia

Nová Dedina Garamújfalu
- Municipality
- Flag Coat of arms

- Location of Nová Dedina in the Nitra Region Location of Nová Dedina in Slovakia
- Coordinates: 48.28°N 18.64°E
- Country: Slovakia
- Region: Nitra Region
- District: Levice District
- First mentioned: 1075

Area
  - Total: 29.16 km^{2} (11.26 sq mi)
- Elevation: 200 m (660 ft)

Population (2025)
  - Total: 1,464
- Time zone: UTC+1 (CET)
  - Summer (DST): UTC+2 (CEST)
- Postal code: 935 25
- Area code: +421 36
- Vehicle registration plate (until 2022): LV
- Website: www.novadedina.sk

Nová Dedina (Hungarian: Garamújfalu) is an old village and municipality in the Levice District in the Nitra Region of Slovakia.

== History ==
In historical records the village was first mentioned in 1075. The original name of this village was Balwany (it means: boulders).

== Geography ==
The municipality lies at an altitude of 200 metres (660 ft) and covers an area of 29.16 km^{2} (11.26 sq mi) (2025).

== Population ==
Population statistic (10 years)
Year	1995	2005	2015	2025
Count	1581	1528	1511	1464
Difference		−3.35%	−1.11%	−3.11%

Population statistic
Year	2024	2025
Count	1455	1464
Difference		+0.61%

It has a population of 1464 people (31 December 2025).

=== Ethnicity ===
Census 2021 (1+ %)
Ethnicity	Number	Fraction
Slovak	1413	97.04%
Not found out	24	1.64%
Total	1456	

In year 2021 was 1456 people by ethnicity 1413 as Slovak, 24 as Not found out, 11 as Czech, 10 as Hungarian, 2 as Italian, 2 as Rusyn, 2 as Russian, 2 as Other, 2 as French, 1 as Ukrainian, 1 as Polish, 1 as German and 1 as English.

Note on population: The difference values of population numbers in the table "Population statistic" and in the sections "Ethnicity" & "Religion" is caused by the use of various statistical methods.

=== Religion ===
Census 2021 (1+ %)
Religion	Number	Fraction
Roman Catholic Church	1157	79.46%
None	218	14.97%
Evangelical Church	34	2.34%
Not found out	23	1.58%
Total	1456	

In year 2021 was 1456 people by religion 1157 from Roman Catholic Church, 218 from None, 34 from Evangelical Church, 23 from Not found out, 4 from Church of the Brethren, 4 from Buddhism, 3 from Other, 3 from Greek Catholic Church, 2 from Old Catholic Church, 2 from Paganism and natural spirituality, 2 from Christian Congregations in Slovakia, 2 from Ad hoc movements, 1 from Calvinist Church and 1 from Eastern Orthodox Church.

== Facilities ==
The village has a public library and football pitch. It also has its own birth registry. It also has two temples: the first (the elder) is sacred to St. Paul (The Conversion of St. Paul) and the second temple is sacred to The Exaltation of The Holy Cross. This more recent temple was built in 2000.
