= Nýrovce =

Nýrovce Nyírágó
- Municipality
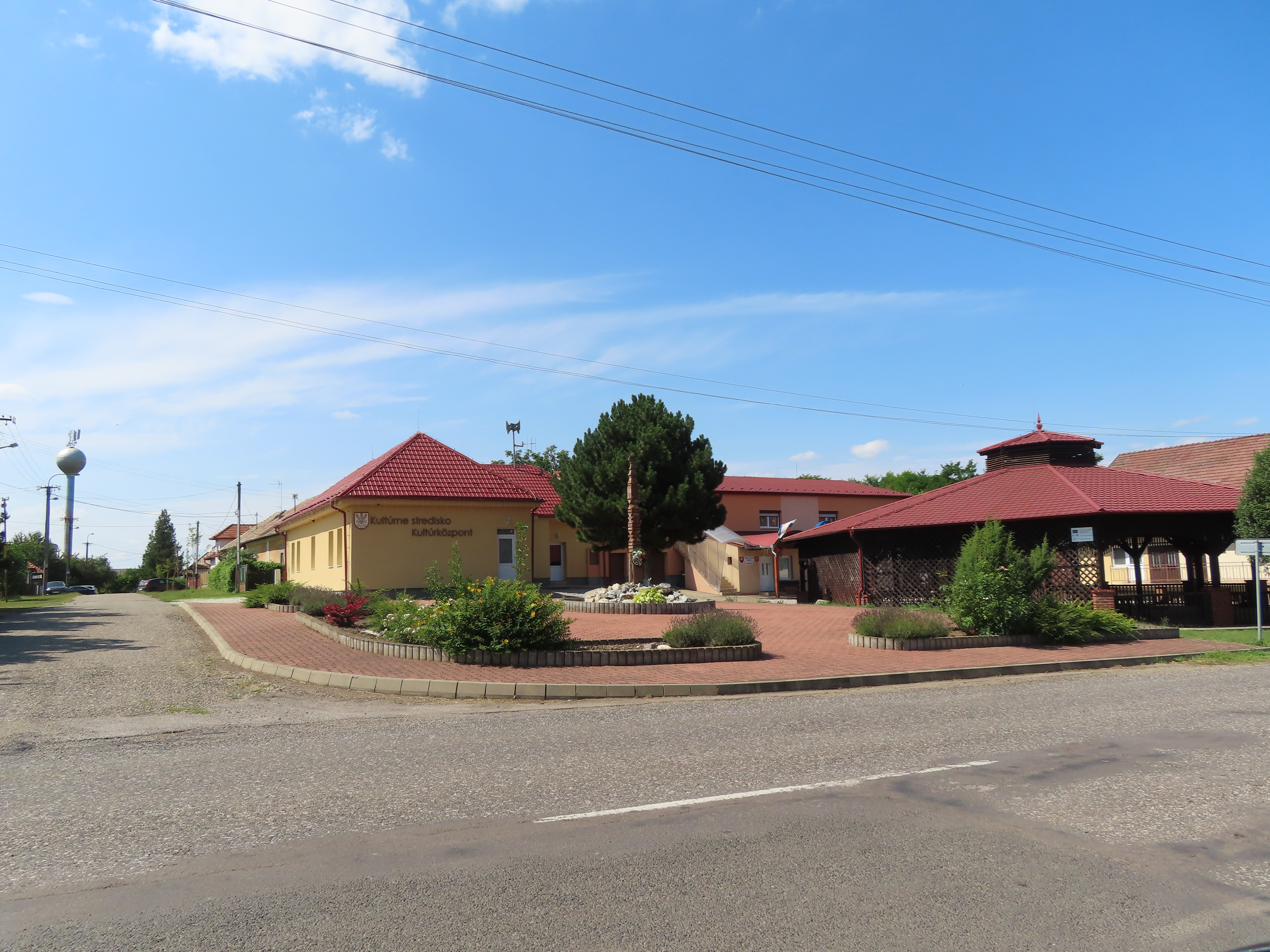

- Flag Coat of arms

- Location of Nýrovce in the Nitra Region Location of Nýrovce in Slovakia
- Coordinates: 48.02°N 18.58°E
- Country: Slovakia
- Region: Nitra Region
- District: Levice District
- First mentioned: 1247

Area
  - Total: 13.49 km^{2} (5.21 sq mi)
- Elevation: 152 m (499 ft)

Population (2025)
  - Total: 510
- Time zone: UTC+1 (CET)
  - Summer (DST): UTC+2 (CEST)
- Postal code: 935 67
- Area code: +421 36
- Vehicle registration plate (until 2022): LV
- Website: www.nyrovce.sk

Nýrovce (Hungarian: Nyírágó or Ágónyír) is an old village and municipality in the Levice District in the Nitra Region of Slovakia.

== History ==
In historical records the village was first mentioned in 1247.

== Geography ==
The municipality lies at an altitude of 152 metres (499 ft) and covers an area of 13.49 km^{2} (5.21 sq mi) (2025).

== Population ==
Population statistic (10 years)
Year	1995	2005	2015	2025
Count	567	566	513	510
Difference		−0.17%	−9.36%	−0.58%

Population statistic
Year	2024	2025
Count	499	510
Difference		+2.20%

It has a population of 510 people (31 December 2025).

=== Ethnicity ===
Census 2021 (1+ %)
Ethnicity	Number	Fraction
Hungarian	297	57.11%
Slovak	207	39.8%
Not found out	40	7.69%
Total	520	

In year 2021 was 520 people by ethnicity 297 as Hungarian, 207 as Slovak, 40 as Not found out, 4 as Czech and 2 as Russian.

Note on population: The difference values of population numbers in the table "Population statistic" and in the sections "Ethnicity" & "Religion" is caused by the use of various statistical methods.

=== Religion ===
Census 2021 (1+ %)
Religion	Number	Fraction
Roman Catholic Church	298	57.31%
None	93	17.88%
Calvinist Church	75	14.42%
Not found out	33	6.35%
Evangelical Church	11	2.12%
Total	520	

In year 2021 was 520 people by religion 298 from Roman Catholic Church, 93 from None, 75 from Calvinist Church, 33 from Not found out, 11 from Evangelical Church, 5 from Greek Catholic Church, 2 from Christian Congregations in Slovakia, 1 from Eastern Orthodox Church, 1 from United Methodist Church and 1 from Ad hoc movements.

== Facilities ==
The village has a public library and football pitch.
