= Hontianska Vrbica =

Village and municipality in Slovakia

Hontianska Vrbica Hontfüzesgyarmat
- Municipality
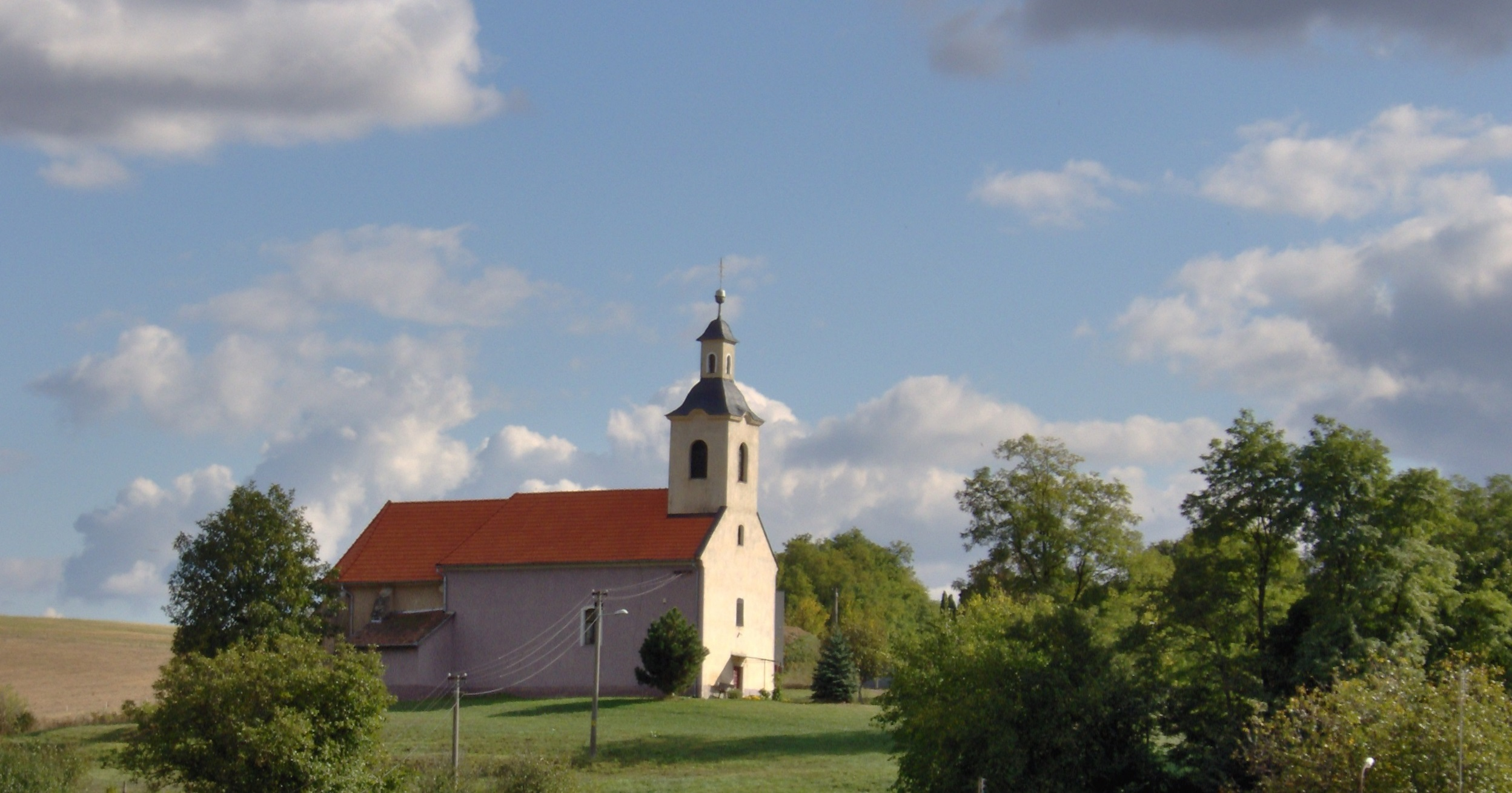
- Church in Hontianska Vrbica

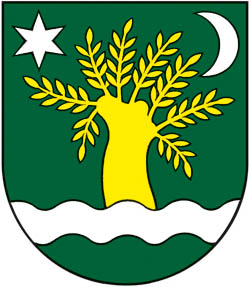
- Flag Coat of arms

- Location of Hontianska Vrbica in the Nitra Region Location of Hontianska Vrbica in Slovakia
- Coordinates: 48.13°N 18.72°E
- Country: Slovakia
- Region: Nitra Region
- District: Levice District
- First mentioned: 1272

Government
  - Mayor: Ondrej Labant

Area
  - Total: 23.85 km^{2} (9.21 sq mi)
- Elevation: 159 m (522 ft)

Population (2025)
  - Total: 583
- Time zone: UTC+1 (CET)
  - Summer (DST): UTC+2 (CEST)
- Postal code: 935 55
- Area code: +421 36
- Vehicle registration plate (until 2022): LV
- Website: www.hontianskavrbica.sk

Hontianska Vrbica (Hungarian: Hontfüzesgyarmat) is a village and municipality in the Levice District in the Nitra Region of Slovakia.

== History ==
In historical records the village was first mentioned in 1272.

== Geography ==
The municipality lies at an altitude of 159 metres (522 ft) and covers an area of 23.85 km^{2} (9.21 sq mi) (2025).

== Population ==
Population statistic (10 years)
Year	1995	2005	2015	2025
Count	573	566	570	583
Difference		−1.22%	+0.70%	+2.28%

Population statistic
Year	2024	2025
Count	584	583
Difference		−0.17%

It has a population of 583 people (31 December 2025).

=== Ethnicity ===
Census 2021 (1+%)
Ethnicity	Number	Fraction
Slovak	427	69.88%
Hungarian	167	27.33%
Not found out	32	5.23%
Total	611	

In year 2021 was 611 people by ethnicity 427 as Slovak, 167 as Hungarian, 32 as Not found out, 5 as Czech, 1 as Ukrainian, 1 as Rusyn and 1 as Polish.

Note on population: The difference values of population numbers in the table "Population statistic" and in the sections "Ethnicity" & "Religion" is caused by the use of various statistical methods.

=== Religion ===
Census 2021 (1+%)
Religion	Number	Fraction
Roman Catholic Church	228	37.32%
None	172	28.15%
Calvinist Church	85	13.91%
Evangelical Church	78	12.77%
Not found out	37	6.06%
Total	611	

In year 2021 was 611 people by religion 228 from Roman Catholic Church, 172 from None, 85 from Calvinist Church, 78 from Evangelical Church, 37 from Not found out, 5 from Greek Catholic Church, 2 from Hinduism, 1 from Other and not ascertained christian church, 1 from Christian Congregations in Slovakia, 1 from Other and 1 from United Methodist Church.

== Facilities ==
The village has a public library and a football pitch.

== Genealogical resources ==
The records for genealogical research are available at the state archive "Statny Archiv in Nitra, Slovakia".

- Roman Catholic church records (births/marriages/deaths): 1796–1897 (parish A)
- Reformed church records (births/marriages/deaths): 1784–1895 (parish A)

== See also ==
- List of municipalities and towns in Slovakia
