= Hontianske Trsťany =

Village and municipality in Slovakia

Hontianske Trsťany Hontnádas
- Municipality
- Flag Coat of arms

- Location of Hontianske Trsťany in the Nitra Region Location of Hontianske Trsťany in Slovakia
- Coordinates: 48.21°N 18.80°E
- Country: Slovakia
- Region: Nitra Region
- District: Levice District
- First mentioned: 1264

Area
  - Total: 15.53 km^{2} (6.00 sq mi)
- Elevation: 164 m (538 ft)

Population (2025)
  - Total: 278
- Time zone: UTC+1 (CET)
  - Summer (DST): UTC+2 (CEST)
- Postal code: 935 86
- Area code: +421 36
- Vehicle registration plate (until 2022): LV
- Website: www.hontiansketrstany.eu

Hontianske Trsťany (Hungarian: Hontnádas) is a village and municipality in the Levice District in the Nitra Region of Slovakia.

== History ==
In historical records the village was first mentioned in 1264.

== Geography ==
The municipality lies at an altitude of 164 metres (538 ft) and covers an area of 15.53 km^{2} (6.00 sq mi) (2025).

== Population ==
Population statistic (10 years)
Year	1995	2005	2015	2025
Count	363	339	316	278
Difference		−6.61%	−6.78%	−12.02%

Population statistic
Year	2024	2025
Count	290	278
Difference		−4.13%

It has a population of 278 people (31 December 2025).

=== Ethnicity ===
Census 2021 (1+ %)
Ethnicity	Number	Fraction
Slovak	300	98.03%
Not found out	5	1.63%
Russian	4	1.3%
Total	306	

In year 2021 was 306 people by ethnicity 300 as Slovak, 5 as Not found out, 4 as Russian, 2 as Other, 1 as German and 1 as Hungarian.

Note on population: The difference values of population numbers in the table "Population statistic" and in the sections "Ethnicity" & "Religion" is caused by the use of various statistical methods.

=== Religion ===
Census 2021 (1+ %)
Religion	Number	Fraction
Roman Catholic Church	256	83.66%
None	32	10.46%
Not found out	8	2.61%
Evangelical Church	7	2.29%
Total	306	

In year 2021 was 306 people by religion 256 from Roman Catholic Church, 32 from None, 8 from Not found out, 7 from Evangelical Church and 3 from Ad hoc movements.

== Facilities ==
The village has a public library and a football pitch.

== Genealogical resources ==
The records for genealogical research are available at the state archive "Statny Archiv in Banska Bystrica, Nitra, Slovakia"

- Roman Catholic church records (births/marriages/deaths): 1693-1895 (parish A)
- Lutheran church records (births/marriages/deaths): 1721-1900 (parish B)

== See also ==
- List of municipalities and towns in Slovakia
