= Sazdice =

Sazdice Százd
- Municipality
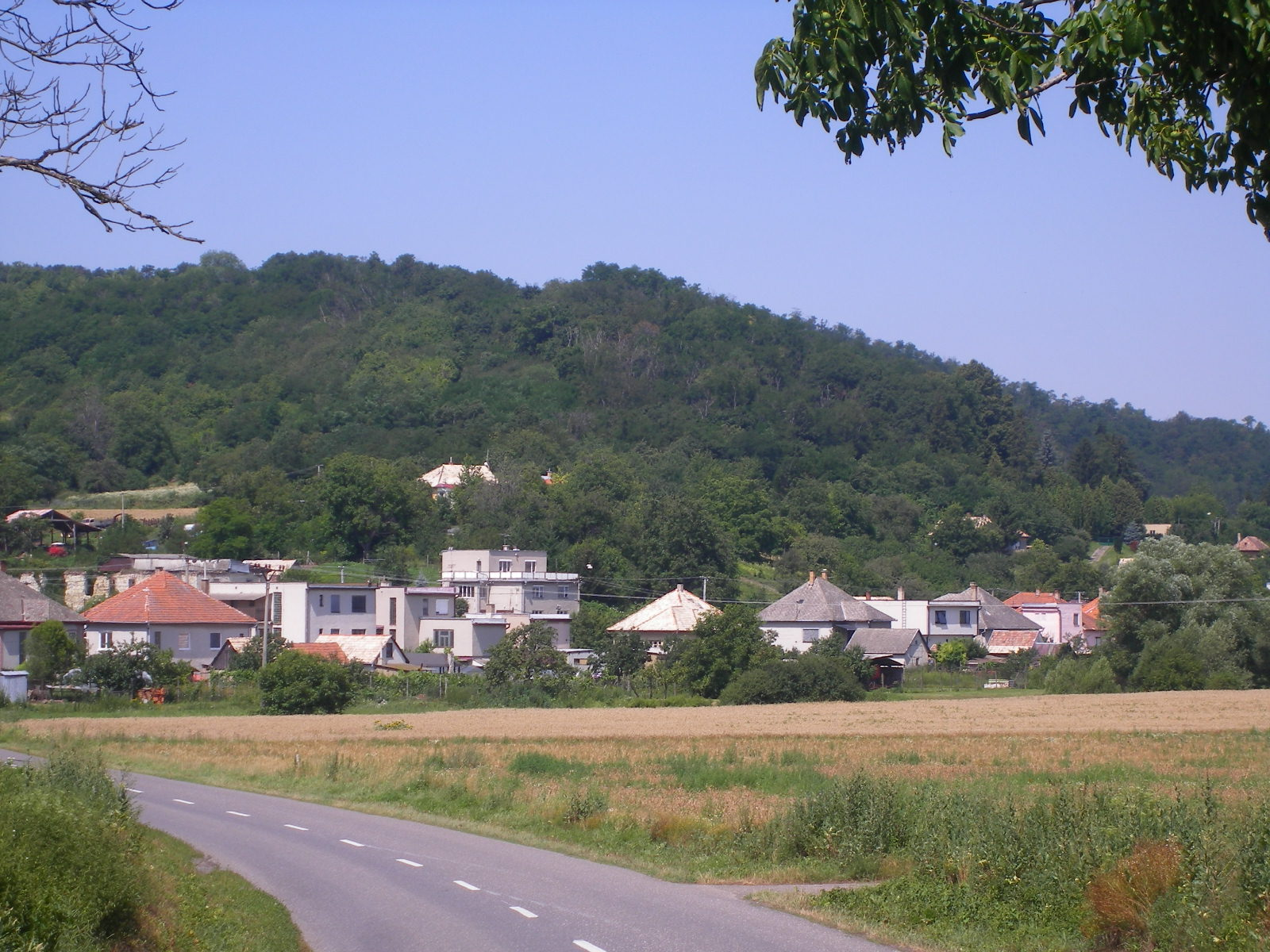

- Flag

- Location of Sazdice in the Nitra Region Location of Sazdice in Slovakia
- Coordinates: 48.08°N 18.80°E
- Country: Slovakia
- Region: Nitra Region
- District: Levice District
- First mentioned: 1291

Area
  - Total: 18.23 km^{2} (7.04 sq mi)
- Elevation: 134 m (440 ft)

Population (2025)
  - Total: 430
- Time zone: UTC+1 (CET)
  - Summer (DST): UTC+2 (CEST)
- Postal code: 935 85
- Area code: +421 36
- Vehicle registration plate (until 2022): LV
- Website: www.sazdice.sk

Sazdice (Hungarian: Százd) is a village and municipality in the Levice District in the Nitra Region of Slovakia. The village was annexed to Czechoslovakia in 1920.

== History ==
In historical records the village was first mentioned in 1261.

== Geography ==
The municipality lies at an altitude of 134 metres (440 ft) and covers an area of 18.23 km^{2} (7.04 sq mi) (2025).

== Population ==
Population statistic (10 years)
Year	1995	2005	2015	2025
Count	459	441	482	430
Difference		−3.92%	+9.29%	−10.78%

Population statistic
Year	2024	2025
Count	433	430
Difference		−0.69%

It has a population of 430 people (31 December 2025).

=== Ethnicity ===
Census 2021 (1+ %)
Ethnicity	Number	Fraction
Slovak	226	48.6%
Hungarian	219	47.09%
Not found out	36	7.74%
Romani	9	1.93%
Total	465	

In year 2021 was 465 people by ethnicity 226 as Slovak, 219 as Hungarian, 36 as Not found out, 9 as Romani, 2 as Ukrainian, 2 as Other, 1 as Irish, 1 as Italian, 1 as Polish, 1 as French and 1 as English.

Note on population: The difference values of population numbers in the table "Population statistic" and in the sections "Ethnicity" & "Religion" is caused by the use of various statistical methods.

=== Religion ===
Census 2021 (1+ %)
Religion	Number	Fraction
Roman Catholic Church	300	64.52%
None	67	14.41%
Evangelical Church	56	12.04%
Not found out	29	6.24%
Jehovah's Witnesses	5	1.08%
Total	465	

In year 2021 was 465 people by religion 300 from Roman Catholic Church, 67 from None, 56 from Evangelical Church, 29 from Not found out, 5 from Jehovah's Witnesses, 2 from Calvinist Church, 2 from Christian Congregations in Slovakia, 2 from Ad hoc movements, 1 from Other and 1 from United Methodist Church.

== Facilities ==
The village has a public library, museum of village history, football pitch and voluntary firefighter organisation.
