= Lula, Levice District =

Village and municipality in Slovakia

Lula Lüle
- Municipality
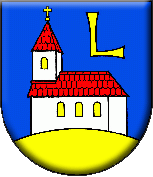
- Flag Coat of arms

- Location of Lula in the Nitra Region Location of Lula in Slovakia
- Coordinates: 48.18°N 18.35°E
- Country: Slovakia
- Region: Nitra Region
- District: Levice District
- First mentioned: 1226

Area
  - Total: 8.38 km^{2} (3.24 sq mi)
- Elevation: 169 m (554 ft)

Population (2025)
  - Total: 168
- Time zone: UTC+1 (CET)
  - Summer (DST): UTC+2 (CEST)
- Postal code: 935 35
- Area code: +421 36
- Vehicle registration plate (until 2022): LV
- Website: www.obeclula.sk

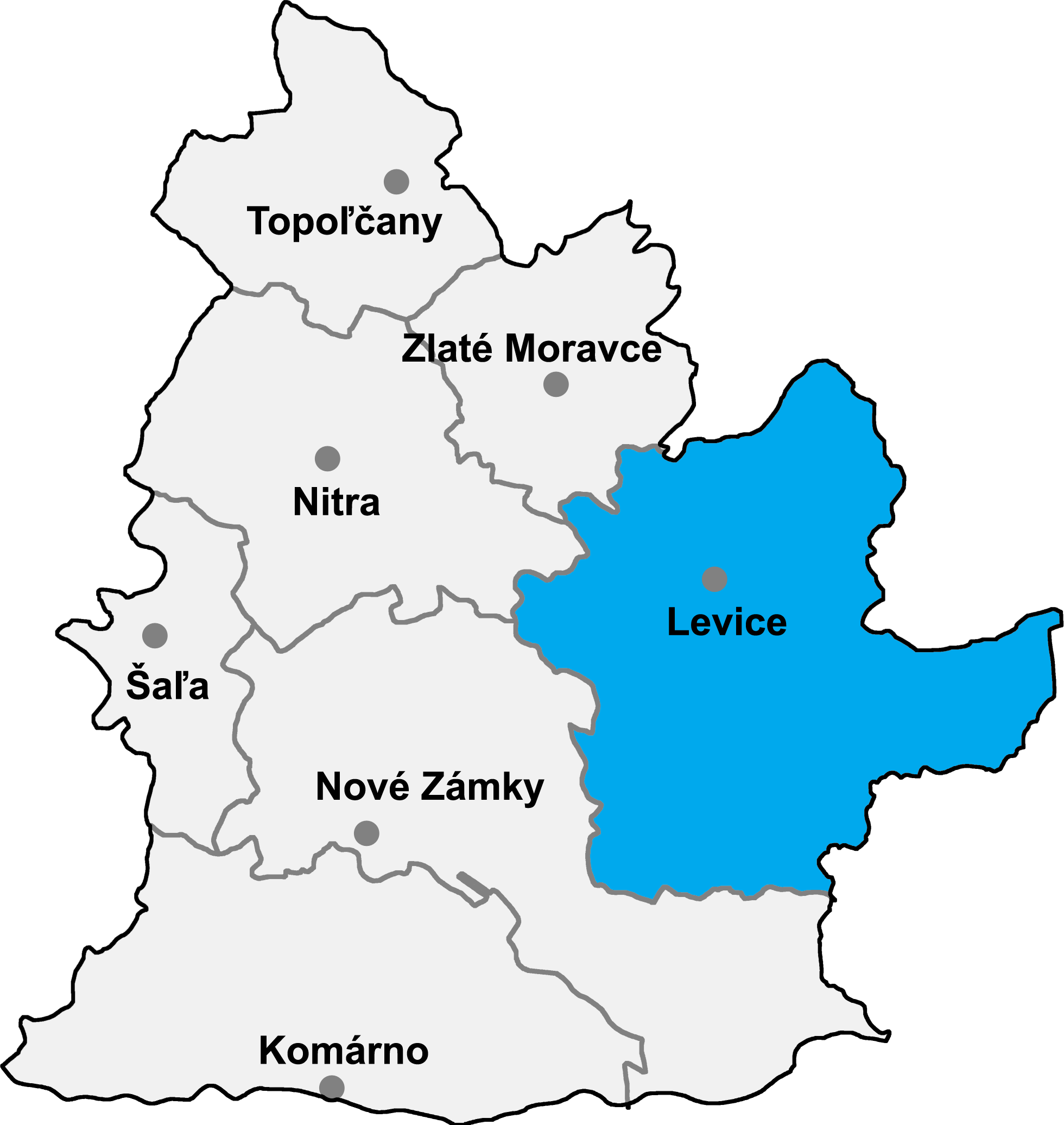

Lula (Hungarian: Lüle) is a village and municipality in the Levice District in the Nitra Region of Slovakia.

== History ==
In historical records the village was first mentioned in 1226.

== Geography ==
The municipality lies at an altitude of 169 metres (554 ft) and covers an area of 8.38 km^{2} (3.24 sq mi) (2025).

== Population ==
Population statistic (10 years)
Year	1995	2005	2015	2025
Count	222	205	175	168
Difference		−7.65%	−14.63%	−4%

Population statistic
Year	2024	2025
Count	162	168
Difference		+3.70%

It has a population of 168 people (31 December 2025).

=== Ethnicity ===
Census 2021 (1+ %)
Ethnicity	Number	Fraction
Slovak	173	98.85%
Hungarian	3	1.71%
Czech	2	1.14%
Total	175	

In year 2021 was 175 people by ethnicity 173 as Slovak, 3 as Hungarian, 2 as Czech and 1 as Russian.

Note on population: The difference values of population numbers in the table "Population statistic" and in the sections "Ethnicity" & "Religion" is caused by the use of various statistical methods.

=== Religion ===
Census 2021 (1+ %)
Religion	Number	Fraction
Roman Catholic Church	158	90.29%
None	12	6.86%
Calvinist Church	2	1.14%
Total	175	

In year 2021 was 175 people by religion 158 from Roman Catholic Church, 12 from None, 2 from Calvinist Church, 1 from Paganism and natural spirituality, 1 from Not found out and 1 from Greek Catholic Church.

== Facilities ==
The village has a public library and football pitch.
