= Plavé Vozokany =

Village and municipality in Slovakia

Plavé Vozokany Fakóvezekény
- Municipality
- Location of Plavé Vozokany in the Nitra Region Location of Plavé Vozokany in Slovakia
- Coordinates: 48.07°N 18.48°E
- Country: Slovakia
- Region: Nitra Region
- District: Levice District
- First mentioned: 1327

Area
  - Total: 23.13 km^{2} (8.93 sq mi)
- Elevation: 166 m (545 ft)

Population (2025)
  - Total: 766
- Time zone: UTC+1 (CET)
  - Summer (DST): UTC+2 (CEST)
- Postal code: 935 69
- Area code: +421 36
- Vehicle registration plate (until 2022): LV
- Website: www.obecplavevozokany.sk

Plavé Vozokany (Hungarian: Fakóvezekény) is a village and municipality in the Levice District in the Nitra Region of Slovakia.

== History ==
In historical records the village was first mentioned in 1327.

== Geography ==
The municipality lies at an altitude of 166 metres (545 ft) and covers an area of 23.13 km^{2} (8.93 sq mi) (2025).

== Population ==
Population statistic (10 years)
Year	1995	2005	2015	2025
Count	931	857	798	766
Difference		−7.94%	−6.88%	−4.01%

Population statistic
Year	2024	2025
Count	768	766
Difference		−0.26%

It has a population of 766 people (31 December 2025).

=== Ethnicity ===
Census 2021 (1+ %)
Ethnicity	Number	Fraction
Slovak	589	76.09%
Not found out	161	20.8%
Romani	46	5.94%
Czech	9	1.16%
Total	774	

In year 2021 was 774 people by ethnicity 589 as Slovak, 161 as Not found out, 46 as Romani, 9 as Czech, 5 as Hungarian, 2 as Russian, 2 as Polish, 1 as Austrian, 1 as German, 1 as Other and 1 as Bulgarian.

Note on population: The difference values of population numbers in the table "Population statistic" and in the sections "Ethnicity" & "Religion" is caused by the use of various statistical methods.

=== Religion ===
Census 2021 (1+ %)
Religion	Number	Fraction
Roman Catholic Church	237	30.62%
Evangelical Church	223	28.81%
Not found out	160	20.67%
None	116	14.99%
Jehovah's Witnesses	20	2.58%
Total	774	

In year 2021 was 774 people by religion 237 from Roman Catholic Church, 223 from Evangelical Church, 160 from Not found out, 116 from None, 20 from Jehovah's Witnesses, 4 from Paganism and natural spirituality, 4 from Christian Congregations in Slovakia, 3 from Calvinist Church, 2 from Eastern Orthodox Church, 1 from Other and not ascertained christian church, 1 from Other, 1 from Greek Catholic Church, 1 from Baptists Church and 1 from Ad hoc movements.

== Facilities ==
The village has a public library and football pitch.
