= Levice District =

Coordinates: 48°12′59″N 18°36′29″E

- District
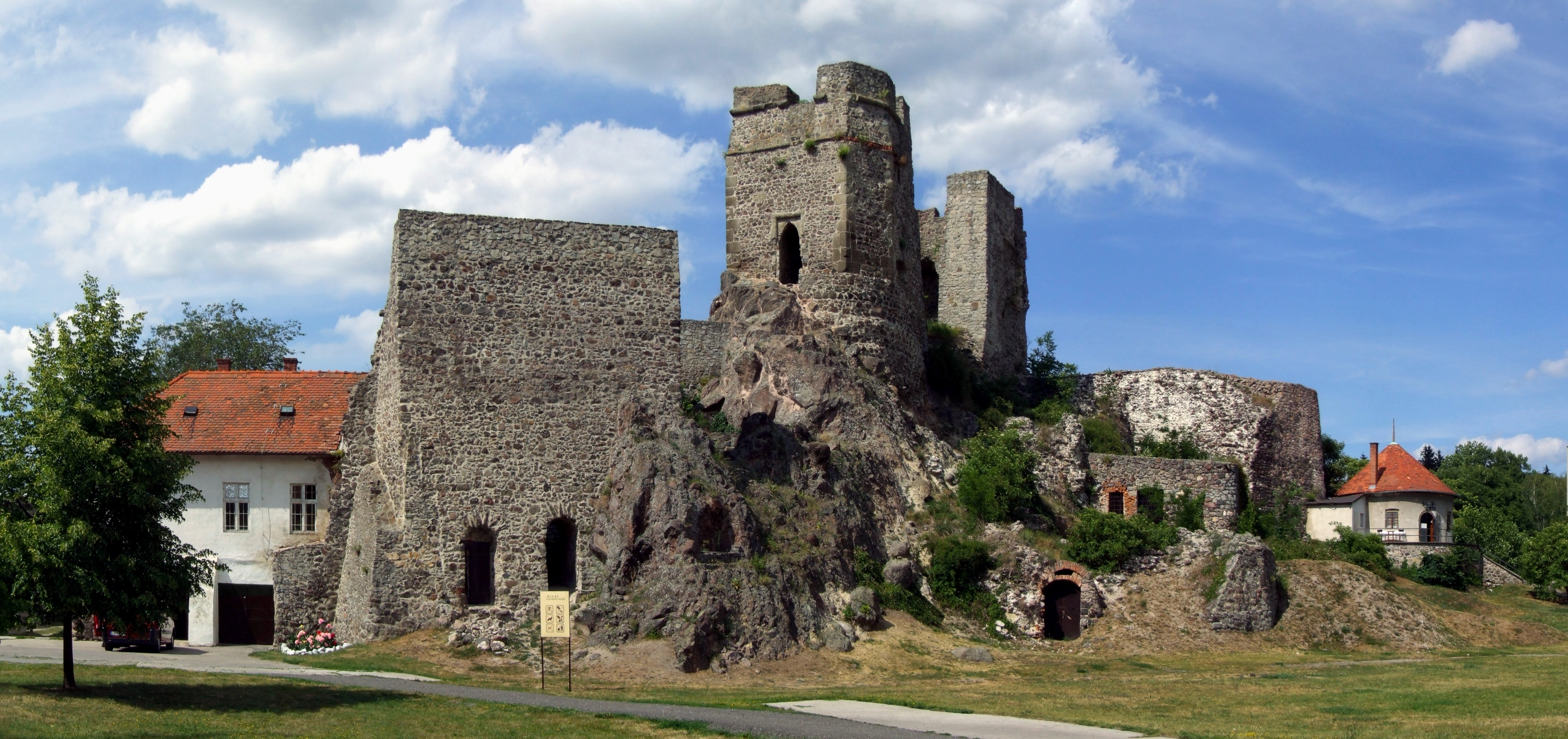
- Country: Slovakia
- Region: Nitra Region
- Seat: Levice

Area
  - Total: 1,551.12 km^{2} (598.89 sq mi)

Population (2025)
  - Total: 107,319
- Time zone: UTC+1 (CET)
  - Summer (DST): UTC+2 (CEST)
- Telephone prefix: 036
- Vehicle registration plate (until 2022): LV
- Municipalities: 89

Levice District (Slovak: okres Levice; Hungarian: Lévai járás) is a district in the Nitra Region of western Slovakia. It is the largest of Slovakia's 79 districts. The west of the district was in the Hungarian county of Bars until 1918, while the east of the district was in Hont County: Farná in the south was in the county of Esztergom (Ostrihom).

== Population ==
Population statistic (10 years)
Year	1995	2005	2015	2025
Count	120,995	118,695	112,874	107,319
Difference		−1.90%	−4.90%	−4.92%

Population statistic
Year	2024	2025
Count	107,992	107,319
Difference		−0.62%

It has a population of 107,319 people (31 December 2025).

Historical population
Year	Pop.	±%
1970	120,251	—
1980	122,240	+1.7%
1991	120,703	−1.3%
2001	120,021	−0.6%
2011	115,367	−3.9%
2021	110,469	−4.2%
Source: Statistical Office of the Slovak Republic

=== Ethnicity ===
Census 2021 (1+ %)
Ethnicity	Number	Fraction
Slovak	79,954	68.97%
Hungarian	25,034	21.59%
Not found out	7236	6.24%
Romani	1802	1.55%
Total	115,915	

In year 2021 was 115,915 people by ethnicity 79,954 as Slovak, 25,034 as Hungarian, 7236 as Not found out, 1802 as Romani, 721 as Czech, 285 as Other, 144 as Russian, 99 as Ukrainian, 80 as German, 78 as Polish, 65 as Italian, 63 as Rusyn, 46 as Vietnamese, 40 as English, 35 as Jewish, 33 as Turkish, 32 as Chinese, 29 as Romanian, 27 as Bulgarian, 24 as Moravian, 19 as Croatian, 16 as Serbian, 13 as Albanian, 11 as Austrian, 11 as French, 7 as Irish, 6 as Canadian, 3 as Silesian and 2 as Greek.

Note on population: The difference values of population numbers in the table "Population statistic" and in the sections "Ethnicity" & "Religion" is caused by the use of various statistical methods.

=== Religion ===
Census 2021 (1+ %)
Religion	Number	Fraction
Roman Catholic Church	61,096	55.31%
None	27,157	24.58%
Not found out	7705	6.97%
Evangelical Church	6208	5.62%
Calvinist Church	4694	4.25%
Total	110,469	

In year 2021 was 110,469 people by religion 61,096 from Roman Catholic Church, 27,157 from None, 7705 from Not found out, 6208 from Evangelical Church, 4694 from Calvinist Church, 728 from Greek Catholic Church, 596 from Church of the Brethren, 458 from Christian Congregations in Slovakia, 311 from Jehovah's Witnesses, 305 from Ad hoc movements, 262 from Other, 173 from Other and not ascertained christian church, 114 from Eastern Orthodox Church, 108 from Islam, 103 from Buddhism, 87 from Baptists Church, 81 from United Methodist Church, 80 from Paganism and natural spirituality, 62 from Old Catholic Church, 45 from Apostolic Church, 26 from Hinduism, 25 from Seventh-day Adventist Church, 24 from Jewish community, 8 from Czechoslovak Hussite Church, 6 from Church of Jesus Christ of Latter-day Saints, 4 from Bahá'i Community and 3 from New Apostolic Church.

== Municipalities ==
Municipality	Area [km^{2}]	Population
Bajka	5.75	330
Bátovce	31.62	1,184
Beša	7.28	620
Bielovce	11.37	211
Bohunice	12.83	160
Bory	8.81	301
Brhlovce	13.38	295
Čajkov	23.93	928
Čaka	9.06	697
Čata	14.77	1,024
Demandice	21.92	909
Devičany	29.87	404
Dolná Seč	8.78	566
Dolné Semerovce	11.86	523
Dolný Pial	13.98	915
Domadice	13.61	229
Drženice	12.86	393
Farná	32.74	1,320
Hokovce	14.40	510
Hontianska Vrbica	23.85	583
Hontianske Trsťany	15.53	278
Horná Seč	8.30	588
Horné Semerovce	10.09	640
Horné Turovce	12.96	556
Horný Pial	6.35	285
Hrkovce	0.00	271
Hronovce	30.96	1,458
Hronské Kľačany	7.88	1,398
Hronské Kosihy	7.08	810
Iňa	5.67	221
Ipeľské Úľany	15.68	251
Ipeľský Sokolec	17.96	843
Jabloňovce	34.69	197
Jesenské	3.79	45
Jur nad Hronom	15.18	971
Kalná nad Hronom	34.13	2,012
Keť	19.64	564
Kozárovce	21.82	2,063
Krškany	17.02	837
Kubáňovo	12.05	254
Kukučínov	11.30	564
Kuraľany	10.68	438
Levice	60.99	30,161
Lok	17.19	1,066
Lontov	15.05	685
Lula	8.38	168
Málaš	15.97	500
Malé Kozmálovce	9.22	369
Malé Ludince	6.80	172
Mýtne Ludany	17.65	1,038
Nová Dedina	29.16	1,464
Nový Tekov	29.70	948
Nýrovce	13.49	510
Ondrejovce	19.61	423
Pastovce	12.74	482
Pečenice	7.91	132
Plášťovce	50.50	1,423
Plavé Vozokany	23.13	766
Podlužany	8.74	755
Pohronský Ruskov	9.11	1,154
Pukanec	26.19	1,736
Rybník	24.69	1,388
Santovka	17.86	649
Sazdice	18.23	430
Sikenica	25.54	589
Slatina	9.51	330
Starý Hrádok	6.56	237
Starý Tekov	10.57	1,596
Šahy	50.92	6,857
Šalov	19.04	361
Šarovce	25.37	1,619
Tehla	19.09	484
Tekovské Lužany	43.93	2,814
Tekovský Hrádok	7.31	369
Tlmače	4.64	3,446
Tupá	11.97	546
Turá	9.28	228
Uhliská	14.09	187
Veľké Kozmálovce	5.92	737
Veľké Ludince	31.80	1,452
Veľké Turovce	9.19	755
Veľký Ďur	22.02	1,299
Vyškovce nad Ipľom	19.29	649
Vyšné nad Hronom	6.47	175
Zalaba	7.35	126
Zbrojníky	16.36	487
Želiezovce	56.52	6,519
Žemberovce	29.51	1,234
Žemliare	4.43	158

Population and area values are current for year 2025.
