= Lontov =

Village and municipality in Slovakia

Lontov Lontó
- Municipality
- Flag Coat of arms

- Location of Lontov in the Nitra Region Location of Lontov in Slovakia
- Coordinates: 48.05°N 18.78°E
- Country: Slovakia
- Region: Nitra Region
- District: Levice District
- First mentioned: 1236

Area
  - Total: 15.05 km^{2} (5.81 sq mi)
- Elevation: 129 m (423 ft)

Population (2025)
  - Total: 685
- Time zone: UTC+1 (CET)
  - Summer (DST): UTC+2 (CEST)
- Postal code: 935 75
- Area code: +421 36
- Vehicle registration plate (until 2022): LV
- Website: www.lontov.sk

Lontov (Hungarian: Lontó) is a village and municipality in the Levice District in the Nitra Region of Slovakia.

== History ==
In historical records the village was first mentioned in 1286.

== Geography ==
The municipality lies at an altitude of 129 metres (423 ft) and covers an area of 15.05 km^{2} (5.81 sq mi) (2025).

== Population ==
Population statistic (10 years)
| Year | 1995 | 2005 | 2015 | 2025 |
|---|---|---|---|---|
| Count | 648 | 708 | 690 | 685 |
| Difference | | +9.25% | −2.54% | −0.72% |

Population statistic
| Year | 2024 | 2025 |
|---|---|---|
| Count | 661 | 685 |
| Difference | | +3.63% |

It has a population of 685 people (31 December 2025).

=== Ethnicity ===
Census 2021 (1+ %)
| Ethnicity | Number | Fraction |
|---|---|---|
| Slovak | 324 | 48.94% |
| Hungarian | 307 | 46.37% |
| Romani | 102 | 15.4% |
| Not found out | 50 | 7.55% |
| Total | 662 | |

In year 2021 was 662 people by ethnicity 324 as Slovak, 307 as Hungarian, 102 as Romani, 50 as Not found out, 1 as Rusyn and 1 as German.

Note on population: The difference values of population numbers in the table "Population statistic" and in the sections "Ethnicity" & "Religion" is caused by the use of various statistical methods.

=== Religion ===
Census 2021 (1+ %)
| Religion | Number | Fraction |
|---|---|---|
| Roman Catholic Church | 452 | 68.28% |
| None | 98 | 14.8% |
| Not found out | 42 | 6.34% |
| Christian Congregations in Slovakia | 34 | 5.14% |
| Calvinist Church | 14 | 2.11% |
| Evangelical Church | 9 | 1.36% |
| Old Catholic Church | 8 | 1.21% |
| Total | 662 | |

In year 2021 was 662 people by religion 452 from Roman Catholic Church, 98 from None, 42 from Not found out, 34 from Christian Congregations in Slovakia, 14 from Calvinist Church, 9 from Evangelical Church, 8 from Old Catholic Church, 2 from Greek Catholic Church, 1 from Jewish community, 1 from Eastern Orthodox Church and 1 from United Methodist Church.

== Facilities ==
The village has a public library and football pitch.
