= Drženice =

Village and municipality in Slovakia

Drženice Derzsenye
- Municipality
- Flag Coat of arms

- Location of Drženice in the Nitra Region Location of Drženice in Slovakia
- Coordinates: 48.28°N 18.70°E
- Country: Slovakia
- Region: Nitra Region
- District: Levice District
- First mentioned: 1296

Area
  - Total: 12.86 km^{2} (4.97 sq mi)
- Elevation: 218 m (715 ft)

Population (2025)
  - Total: 393
- Time zone: UTC+1 (CET)
  - Summer (DST): UTC+2 (CEST)
- Postal code: 935 03
- Area code: +421 36
- Vehicle registration plate (until 2022): LV
- Website: www.drzenice.sk

Drženice (Hungarian: Derzsenye) is a village and municipality in the Levice District in the Nitra Region of Slovakia.

== History ==
In historical records the village was first mentioned in 1296.

== Geography ==
The municipality lies at an altitude of 218 metres (715 ft) and covers an area of 12.86 km^{2} (4.97 sq mi) (2025).

== Population ==
Population statistic (10 years)
Year	1995	2005	2015	2025
Count	428	408	384	393
Difference		−4.67%	−5.88%	+2.34%

Population statistic
Year	2024	2025
Count	389	393
Difference		+1.02%

It has a population of 393 people (31 December 2025).

=== Ethnicity ===
Census 2021 (1+ %)
Ethnicity	Number	Fraction
Slovak	351	91.88%
Not found out	29	7.59%
Romani	5	1.3%
Russian	4	1.04%
Hungarian	4	1.04%
Total	382	

In year 2021 was 382 people by ethnicity 351 as Slovak, 29 as Not found out, 5 as Romani, 4 as Russian, 4 as Hungarian and 3 as Other.

Note on population: The difference values of population numbers in the table "Population statistic" and in the sections "Ethnicity" & "Religion" is caused by the use of various statistical methods.

=== Religion ===
Census 2021 (1+ %)
Religion	Number	Fraction
Roman Catholic Church	206	53.93%
None	82	21.47%
Evangelical Church	56	14.66%
Not found out	26	6.81%
Total	382	

In year 2021 was 382 people by religion 206 from Roman Catholic Church, 82 from None, 56 from Evangelical Church, 26 from Not found out, 3 from Paganism and natural spirituality, 2 from Other, 2 from Greek Catholic Church, 1 from Old Catholic Church, 1 from Other and not ascertained christian church, 1 from Jehovah's Witnesses, 1 from Christian Congregations in Slovakia and 1 from Ad hoc movements.

== Facilities ==
The village has a public library and a football pitch.

== Genealogical resources ==
The records for genealogical research are available at the state archive "Statny Archiv in Nitra, Slovakia"

- Roman Catholic church records (births/marriages/deaths): 1656-1896 (parish B)
- Lutheran church records (births/marriages/deaths): 1745-1948 (parish A)

== See also ==
- List of municipalities and towns in Slovakia
