= Žemberovce =

Žemberovce Zsember
- Municipality
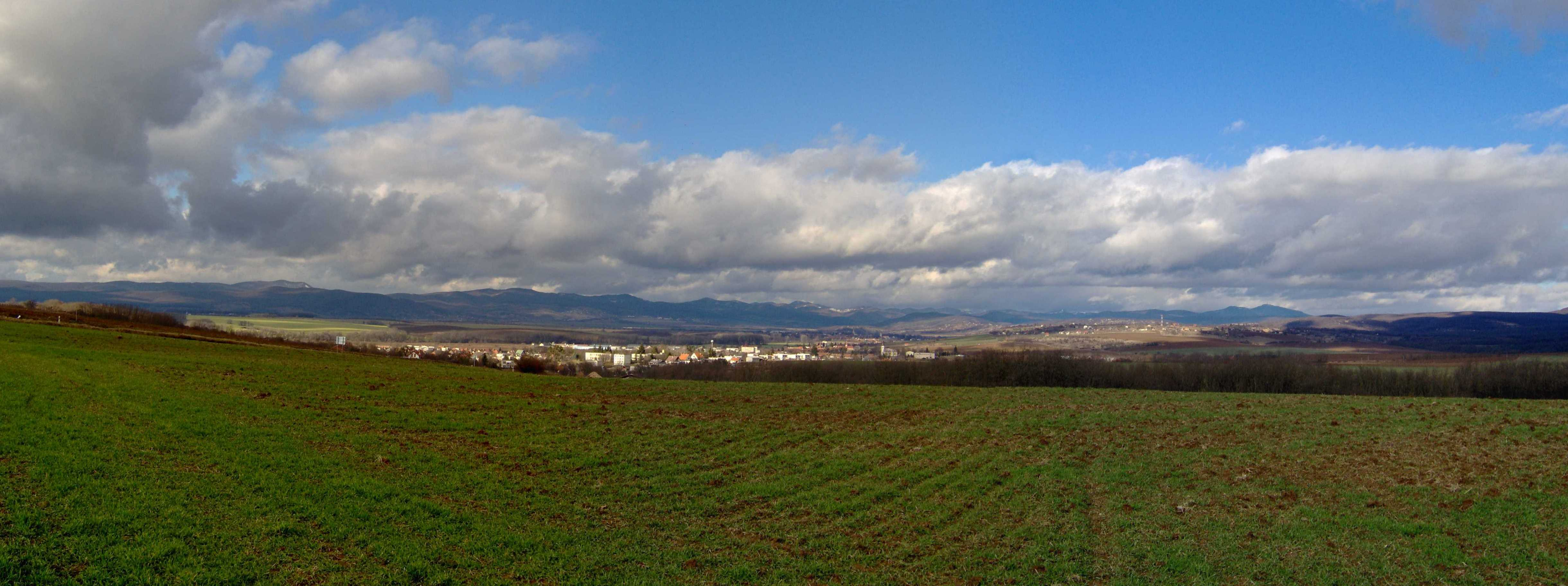
- Panorama of Žemberovce

- Flag

- Location of Žemberovce in the Nitra Region Location of Žemberovce in Slovakia
- Coordinates: 48.27°N 18.75°E
- Country: Slovakia
- Region: Nitra Region
- District: Levice District
- First mentioned: 1256

Area
  - Total: 29.51 km^{2} (11.39 sq mi)
- Elevation: 221 m (725 ft)

Population (2025)
  - Total: 1,234
- Time zone: UTC+1 (CET)
  - Summer (DST): UTC+2 (CEST)
- Postal code: 935 02
- Area code: +421 36
- Vehicle registration plate (until 2022): LV
- Website: www.zemberovce.sk

Žemberovce (Hungarian: Zsember) is a village and municipality in the Levice District in the Nitra Region of Slovakia.

== History ==
In historical records the village was first mentioned in 1256.

== Geography ==
The municipality lies at an altitude of 221 metres (725 ft) and covers an area of 29.51 km^{2} (11.39 sq mi) (2025).

== Population ==
Population statistic (10 years)
Year	1995	2005	2015	2025
Count	1300	1233	1266	1234
Difference		−5.15%	+2.67%	−2.52%

Population statistic
Year	2024	2025
Count	1235	1234
Difference		−0.08%

It has a population of 1234 people (31 December 2025).

=== Ethnicity ===
Census 2021 (1+ %)
Ethnicity	Number	Fraction
Slovak	1142	92.92%
Not found out	62	5.04%
Hungarian	16	1.3%
Total	1229	

In year 2021 was 1229 people by ethnicity 1142 as Slovak, 62 as Not found out, 16 as Hungarian, 7 as Ukrainian, 6 as Czech, 4 as Russian, 4 as Other, 2 as Romani, 1 as Rusyn and 1 as English.

Note on population: The difference values of population numbers in the table "Population statistic" and in the sections "Ethnicity" & "Religion" is caused by the use of various statistical methods.

=== Religion ===
Census 2021 (1+ %)
Religion	Number	Fraction
Roman Catholic Church	631	51.34%
None	255	20.75%
Evangelical Church	240	19.53%
Not found out	62	5.04%
Total	1229	

In year 2021 was 1229 people by religion 631 from Roman Catholic Church, 255 from None, 240 from Evangelical Church, 62 from Not found out, 9 from Ad hoc movements, 7 from Christian Congregations in Slovakia, 7 from Greek Catholic Church, 6 from Calvinist Church, 6 from Other, 3 from Church of the Brethren, 2 from Islam and 1 from Other and not ascertained christian church.

== Facilities ==
The village has a public library, football pitch and a gym.
