= Dolný Pial =

Village and municipality in Slovakia

Dolný Pial Alsópél
- Municipality
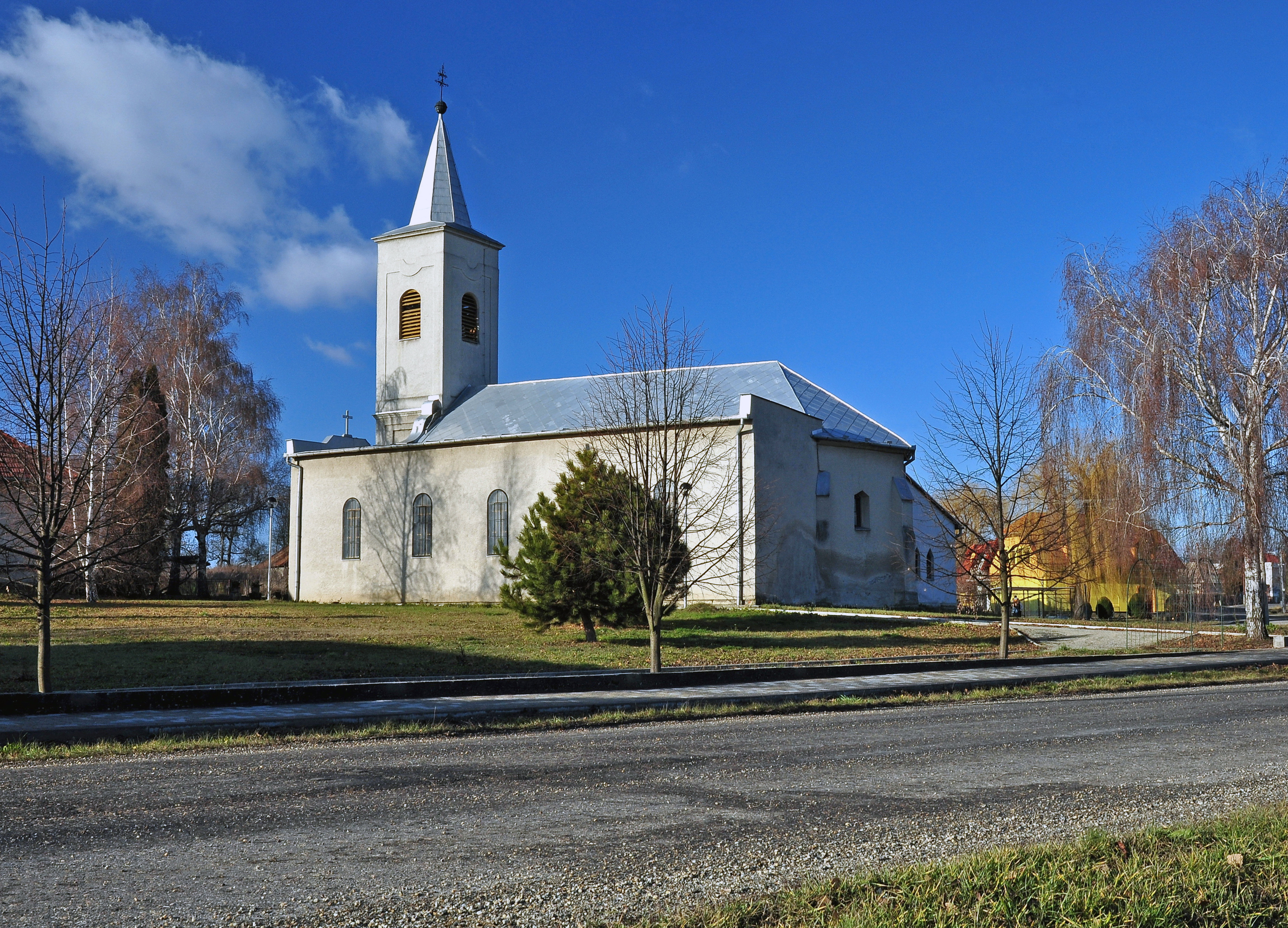

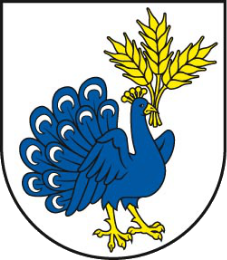
- Flag Coat of arms

- Location of Dolný Pial in the Nitra Region Location of Dolný Pial in Slovakia
- Coordinates: 48.13°N 18.47°E
- Country: Slovakia
- Region: Nitra Region
- District: Levice District
- First mentioned: 1470

Area
  - Total: 13.98 km^{2} (5.40 sq mi)
- Elevation: 178 m (584 ft)

Population (2025)
  - Total: 915
- Time zone: UTC+1 (CET)
  - Summer (DST): UTC+2 (CEST)
- Postal code: 935 37
- Area code: +421 36
- Vehicle registration plate (until 2022): LV
- Website: www.dolnypial.sk

Dolný Pial (Hungarian: Alsópél) is a village and municipality in the Levice District in the Nitra Region of Slovakia.

== History ==
In historical records the village was first mentioned in 1470.

== Geography ==
The municipality lies at an altitude of 178 metres (584 ft) and covers an area of 13.98 km^{2} (5.40 sq mi) (2025).

== Population ==
Population statistic (10 years)
| Year | 1995 | 2005 | 2015 | 2025 |
|---|---|---|---|---|
| Count | 956 | 982 | 943 | 915 |
| Difference | | +2.71% | −3.97% | −2.96% |

Population statistic
| Year | 2024 | 2025 |
|---|---|---|
| Count | 923 | 915 |
| Difference | | −0.86% |

It has a population of 915 people (31 December 2025).

=== Ethnicity ===
Census 2021 (1+ %)
| Ethnicity | Number | Fraction |
|---|---|---|
| Slovak | 849 | 93.19% |
| Romani | 54 | 5.92% |
| Not found out | 30 | 3.29% |
| Hungarian | 26 | 2.85% |
| Czech | 12 | 1.31% |
| Total | 911 | |

In year 2021 was 911 people by ethnicity 849 as Slovak, 54 as Romani, 30 as Not found out, 26 as Hungarian, 12 as Czech, 6 as Ukrainian, 4 as Russian, 3 as English, 2 as Italian, 1 as Rusyn and 1 as Other.

Note on population: The difference values of population numbers in the table "Population statistic" and in the sections "Ethnicity" & "Religion" is caused by the use of various statistical methods.

=== Religion ===
Census 2021 (1+ %)
| Religion | Number | Fraction |
|---|---|---|
| Roman Catholic Church | 682 | 74.86% |
| None | 152 | 16.68% |
| Not found out | 31 | 3.4% |
| Evangelical Church | 11 | 1.21% |
| Total | 911 | |

In year 2021 was 911 people by religion 682 from Roman Catholic Church, 152 from None, 31 from Not found out, 11 from Evangelical Church, 8 from Calvinist Church, 8 from Christian Congregations in Slovakia, 5 from Paganism and natural spirituality, 3 from Eastern Orthodox Church, 3 from Other, 3 from Greek Catholic Church, 2 from Buddhism, 1 from Other and not ascertained christian church, 1 from Baptists Church and 1 from Ad hoc movements.

== Facilities ==
The village has a public library, a gym, and a football pitch.

== Genealogical resources ==
The records for genealogical research are available at the state archive "Statny Archiv in Nitra, Slovakia"

- Roman Catholic church records (births/marriages/deaths): 1725-1895 (parish A)
- Reformated church records (births/marriages/deaths): 1784-1895 (parish B)

== See also ==
- List of municipalities and towns in Slovakia
