= Veľké Turovce =

Veľké Turovce Nagytúr
- Municipality
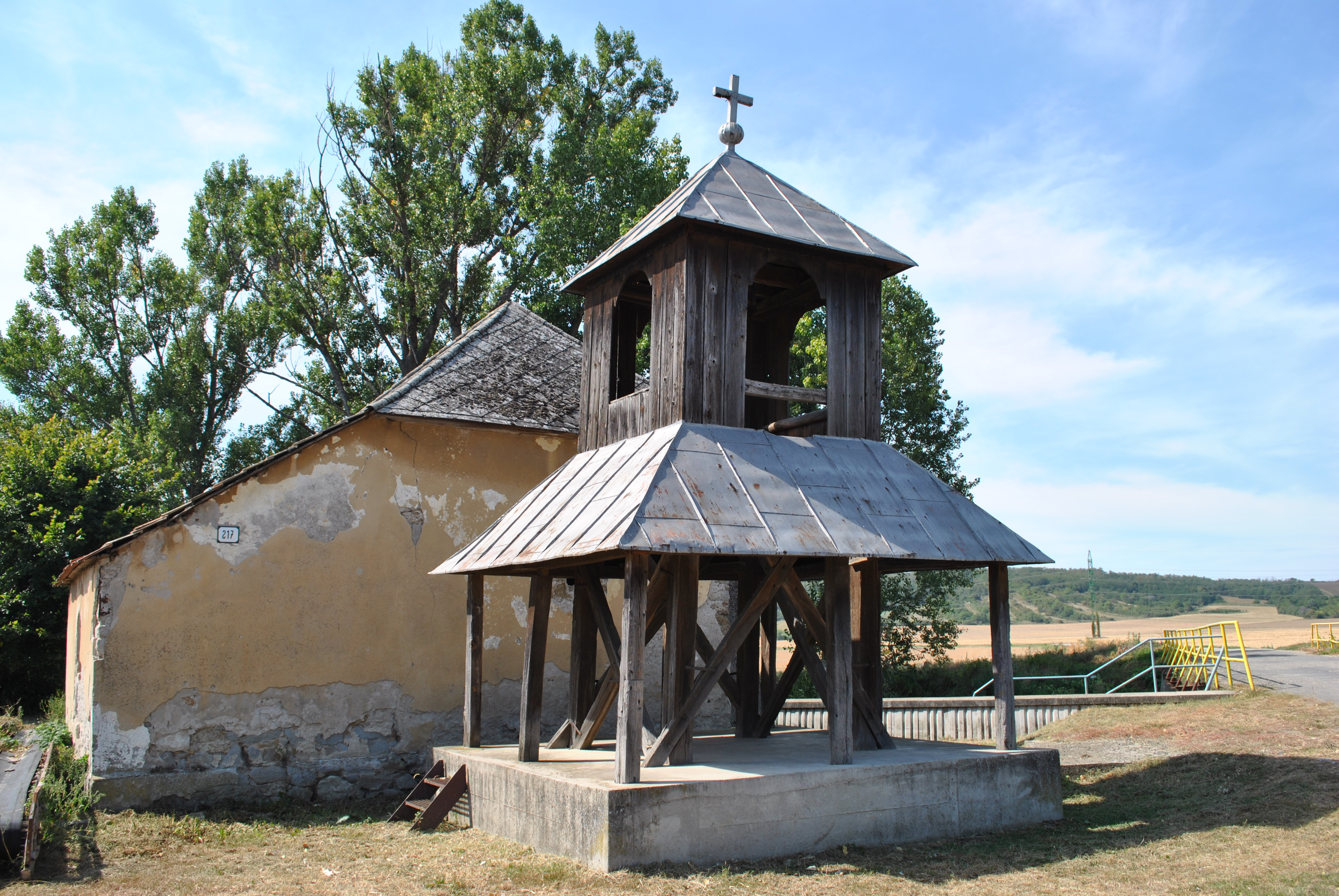
- Belfry of the Church of Saint Martin

- Flag

- Location of Veľké Turovce in the Nitra Region Location of Veľké Turovce in Slovakia
- Coordinates: 48.10°N 18.94°E
- Country: Slovakia
- Region: Nitra Region
- District: Levice District
- First mentioned: 1156

Area
  - Total: 9.19 km^{2} (3.55 sq mi)
- Elevation: 134 m (440 ft)

Population (2025)
  - Total: 755
- Time zone: UTC+1 (CET)
  - Summer (DST): UTC+2 (CEST)
- Postal code: 935 81
- Area code: +421 36
- Vehicle registration plate (until 2022): LV
- Website: www.velketurovce.sk

Veľké Turovce (Hungarian: Nagytúr) is a village and municipality in the Levice District in the Nitra Region of Slovakia.

== History ==
In historical records the village was first mentioned in 1156.

== Geography ==
The municipality lies at an altitude of 134 metres (440 ft) and covers an area of 9.19 km^{2} (3.55 sq mi) (2025).

== Population ==
Population statistic (10 years)
Year	1995	2005	2015	2025
Count	821	807	758	755
Difference		−1.70%	−6.07%	−0.39%

Population statistic
Year	2024	2025
Count	749	755
Difference		+0.80%

It has a population of 755 people (31 December 2025).

=== Ethnicity ===
Census 2021 (1+ %)
Ethnicity	Number	Fraction
Hungarian	409	55.12%
Slovak	336	45.28%
Not found out	21	2.83%
Total	742	

In year 2021 was 742 people by ethnicity 409 as Hungarian, 336 as Slovak, 21 as Not found out, 3 as Czech, 1 as Ukrainian, 1 as Silesian, 1 as Russian and 1 as Other.

Note on population: The difference values of population numbers in the table "Population statistic" and in the sections "Ethnicity" & "Religion" is caused by the use of various statistical methods.

=== Religion ===
Census 2021 (1+ %)
Religion	Number	Fraction
Roman Catholic Church	536	72.24%
None	87	11.73%
Evangelical Church	82	11.05%
Not found out	17	2.29%
Christian Congregations in Slovakia	12	1.62%
Total	742	

In year 2021 was 742 people by religion 536 from Roman Catholic Church, 87 from None, 82 from Evangelical Church, 17 from Not found out, 12 from Christian Congregations in Slovakia, 3 from Calvinist Church, 2 from United Methodist Church, 1 from Islam, 1 from Greek Catholic Church and 1 from Buddhism.

== Facilities ==
The village has a public library and football pitch.
