= Rybník, Levice District =

Rybník Garamszőlős
- Municipality
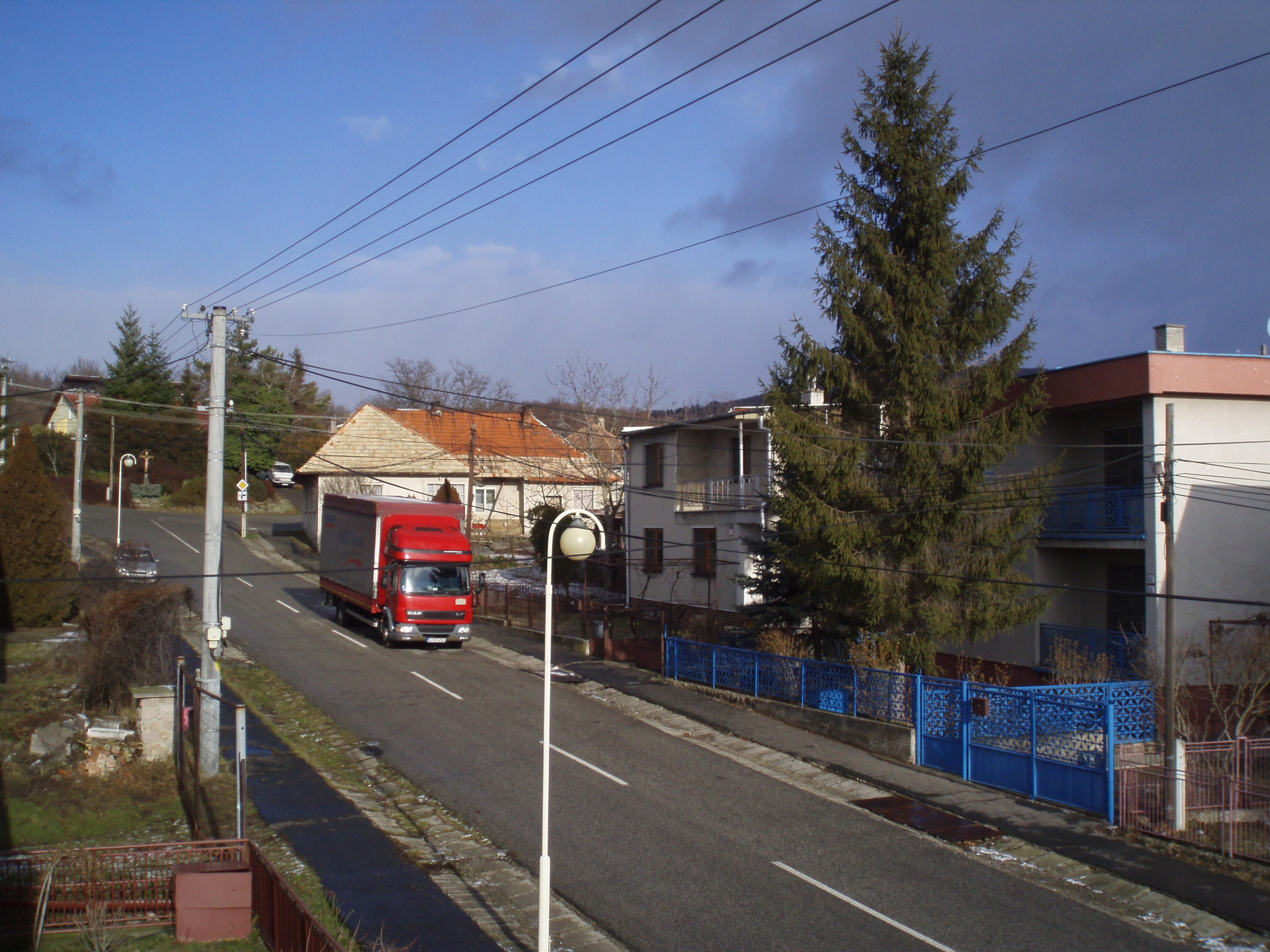

- Flag

- Location of Rybník, district levice in the Nitra Region Location of Rybník, district levice in Slovakia
- Coordinates: 48.29°N 18.56°E
- Country: Slovakia
- Region: Nitra Region
- District: Levice District
- First mentioned: 1075

Area
  - Total: 24.69 km^{2} (9.53 sq mi)
- Elevation: 190 m (620 ft)

Population (2025)
  - Total: 1,388
- Time zone: UTC+1 (CET)
  - Summer (DST): UTC+2 (CEST)
- Postal code: 935 23
- Area code: +421 36
- Vehicle registration plate (until 2022): LV
- Website: www.obecrybnik.sk

Rybník (Hungarian: Garamszőlős) is a village and municipality with 1420 inhabitants (as of December 31, 2020) in the Levice District in the Nitra Region of Slovakia.

== History ==
In the Early Bronze Age, there was a fortified settlement on Mount Kusá hora, the remains of which have been examined annually since 2004 in a collaboration between the Slovak Archaeological Institute of the Slovak Academy of Sciences and the German RGK.

The place was first mentioned in writing in 1075 in the founding document of Hronský Beňadik Abbey as Sceulleus. The name refers to a centuries-long winemaking tradition. After the Mongol invasion, there was a reorganization of the ownership conditions, whereby the majority of the estate came to the Archdiocese of Gran and in 1776 changed to the newly created Diocese of Neusohl. In 1534 there were a total of 32 portahere, in modern times the village was a small town, which received market rights in 1781. In 1828 there were 134 houses and 943 inhabitants, most of whom were employed in agriculture.

Until 1918, the village in Perch county belonged to the Kingdom of Hungary and then came to Czechoslovakia and today Slovakia.

== Geography ==
The community is located on the southwestern edge of the Štiavnica Mountains, where they merge into the Danube hills. The Hron flowing west of the village breaks through the foothills through the so-called Slovak Gate (Slovak Slovenská brána). The lower parts of the municipal area on the floodplains of the Hron are intensively used for agriculture, on the mountain slopes viticulture is practiced, while the mountains themselves are covered by oak forest. The town centre is located at an altitude of 205 meters above sea level and is two kilometres from Tlmače and ten kilometres from Levice.

Neighboring municipalities are Hronský Beňadik and Tekovská Breznica to the north, Čajkov to the east, Hronské Kosihy to the south, Veľké Kozmálovce to the southwest, Tlmače to the west and Kozárovce to the northwest.

== Population ==
Population statistic (10 years)
Year	1995	2005	2015	2025
Count	1384	1401	1439	1388
Difference		+1.22%	+2.71%	−3.54%

Population statistic
Year	2024	2025
Count	1385	1388
Difference		+0.21%

It has a population of 1388 people (31 December 2025).

=== Ethnicity ===
Census 2021 (1+ %)
Ethnicity	Number	Fraction
Slovak	1369	97.36%
Not found out	20	1.42%
Total	1406	

In year 2021 was 1406 people by ethnicity 1369 as Slovak, 20 as Not found out, 14 as Czech, 12 as Russian, 5 as Hungarian, 3 as Polish, 3 as Other, 2 as Canadian, 2 as English, 1 as Rusyn, 1 as Romanian and 1 as Moravian.

Note on population: The difference values of population numbers in the table "Population statistic" and in the sections "Ethnicity" & "Religion" is caused by the use of various statistical methods.

=== Religion ===
Census 2021 (1+ %)
Religion	Number	Fraction
Roman Catholic Church	994	70.7%
None	317	22.55%
Not found out	29	2.06%
Evangelical Church	29	2.06%
Total	1406	

In year 2021 was 1406 people by religion 994 from Roman Catholic Church, 317 from None, 29 from Not found out, 29 from Evangelical Church, 9 from Greek Catholic Church, 7 from Paganism and natural spirituality, 4 from Christian Congregations in Slovakia, 4 from Other, 3 from Calvinist Church, 3 from Other and not ascertained christian church, 2 from Jehovah's Witnesses, 2 from Ad hoc movements, 1 from Jewish community, 1 from Eastern Orthodox Church and 1 from Buddhism.

== Facilities ==
The village has a public library a gym and football pitch. It also has its own birth registry.

== Notable people ==
- Elmer Valo, baseball player
