= List of Major League Baseball career games played as a right fielder leaders =

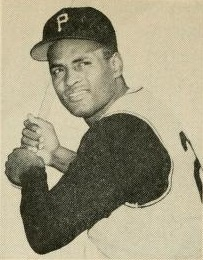
Roberto Clemente, the all-time leader in games played as a right fielder.

Games played (most often abbreviated as G or GP) is a statistic used in team sports to indicate the total number of games in which a player has participated (in any capacity); the statistic is generally applied irrespective of whatever portion of the game is contested. In baseball, the statistic applies also to players who, before a game, are included on a starting lineup card or are announced as ex ante substitutes, whether or not they play; however, in Major League Baseball, the application of this statistic does not extend to consecutive games played streaks. A starting pitcher, then, may be credited with a game played even if he is not credited with a game started or an inning pitched. The right fielder (RF) is one of the three outfielders, the defensive positions in baseball farthest from the batter. The right field is the area of the outfield to the right of a person standing at home plate and facing toward the pitcher's mound. The outfielders must try to catch long fly balls before they hit the ground or to quickly catch or retrieve and return to the infield any other balls entering the outfield. The right fielder must also be adept at navigating the area of right field where the foul line approaches the corner of the playing field and the walls of the seating areas. Being the outfielder farthest from third base, the right fielder often has to make longer throws than the other outfielders to throw out runners advancing around the bases, so they often have the strongest or most accurate throwing arm. The right fielder normally plays behind the second baseman and first baseman, who play in or near the infield; unlike catchers and most infielders (excepting first basemen), who are virtually exclusively right-handed, right fielders can be either right- or left-handed. In the scoring system used to record defensive plays, the right fielder is assigned the number 9, the highest number.

Because game accounts and box scores often did not distinguish between the outfield positions, there has been some difficulty in determining precise defensive statistics before 1901; because of this, and because of the similarity in their roles, defensive statistics for the three positions are frequently combined. However, efforts to distinguish between the three positions regarding games played during this period and reconstruct the separate totals have been largely successful; players whose totals include pre-1901 games are notated in the table below. Roberto Clemente is the all-time leader in career games played as a right fielder with 2,305. Paul Waner (2,250), Harry Hooper (2,183), Hank Aaron (2,174), Mel Ott (2,161), Tony Gwynn (2,144), Dwight Evans (2,092), Nick Markakis (2,074), Al Kaline (2,031), Willie Keeler (2,019), and Sammy Sosa (2,015) are the only other players to appear in over 2,000 games in right field in their careers.

== Key ==
**Rank**	Rank amongst leaders in career games played. A blank field indicates a tie.
**Player (2026 Gs)**	Number of games played during the 2026 Major League Baseball season
**MLB**	Total career games played as a right fielder in Major League Baseball
*	Denotes elected to National Baseball Hall of Fame
†	Denotes total including pre-1901 games
**Bold**	Denotes active player (Note: A player is considered inactive if he has announced his retirement or has not played for a full season.)

== List ==
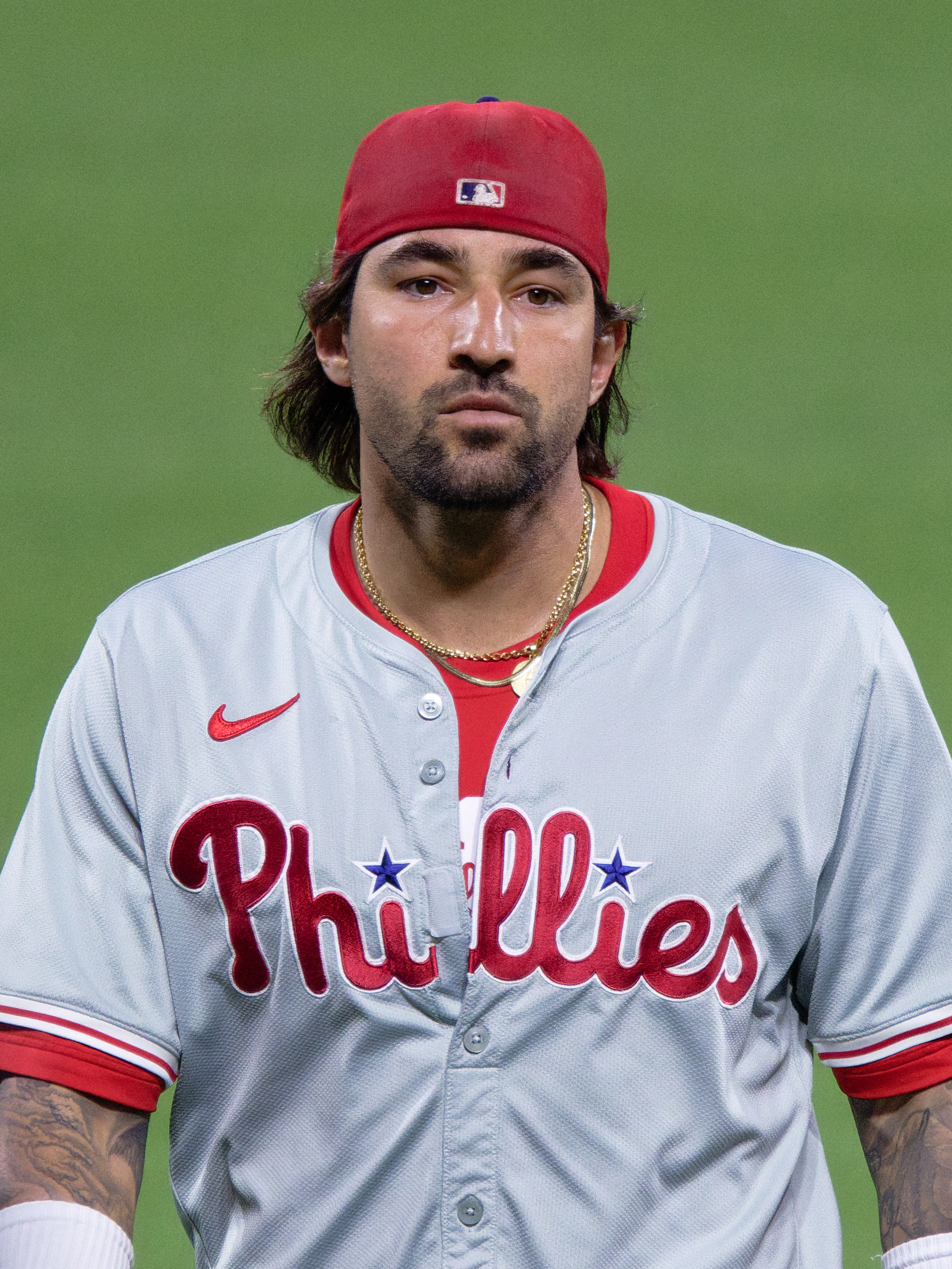
Nick Castellanos, the active leader and 74th all-time in games played as a right fielder.

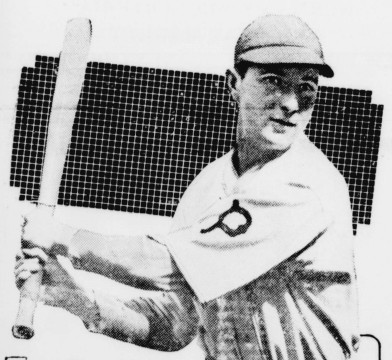
Paul Waner held the major league record for 29 years.

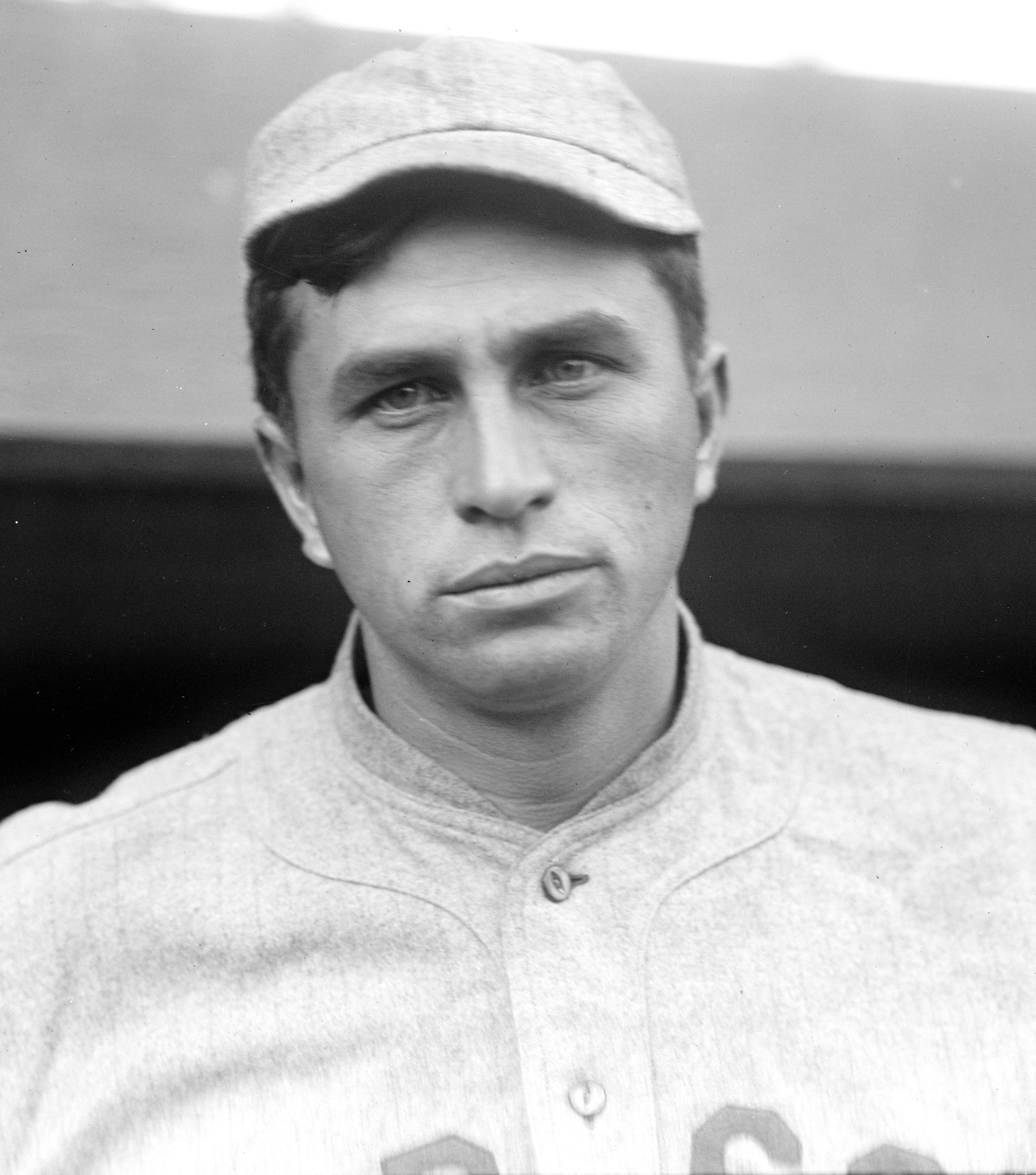
Harry Hooper holds the American League record.

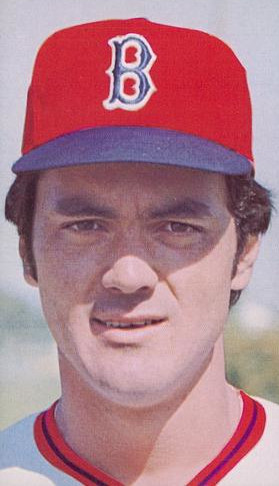
Dwight Evans' 2,092 games as a right fielder in the American League are the most by any player since 1920.

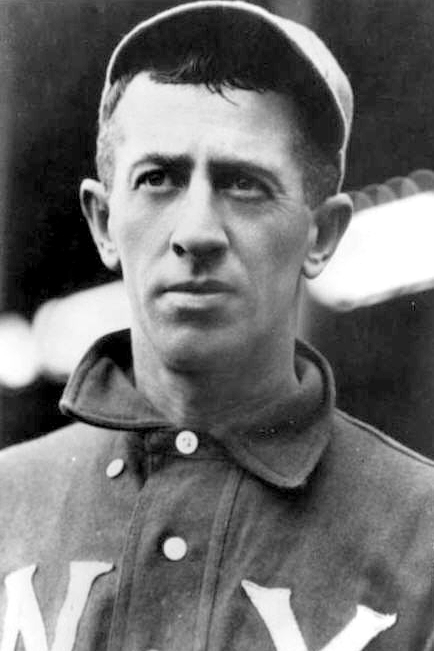
Willie Keeler was the first player to appear in 2,000 games in right field.

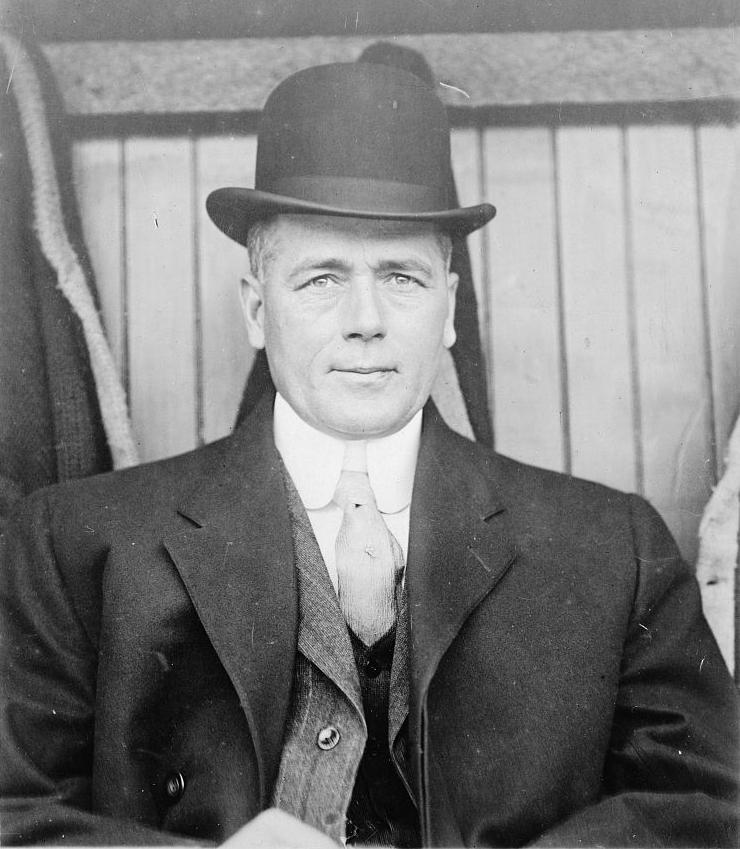
Patsy Donovan held the National League record for 32 years.

- Stats updated as of September 27, 2026.

Rank	Player (2026 Gs)	Games as a right fielder			Other leagues, notes
Rank	Player (2026 Gs)	MLB	American League	National League	Other leagues, notes
1	Roberto Clemente*	2,305	0	2,305	
2	Paul Waner*	2,250	0	2,250	Held major league record, 1943–1972; held National League record, 1936–1972
3	Harry Hooper*	2,183	2,183	0	Held major league record, 1924–1943
4	Hank Aaron*	2,174	0	2,174	
5	Mel Ott*	2,161	0	2,161	
6	Tony Gwynn*	2,144	0	2,144	
7	Dwight Evans	2,092	2,092	0	
8	Nick Markakis	2,074	1,325	749	
9	Al Kaline*	2,031	2,031	0	
10	Sammy Sosa	2,015	346	1,669	
11	Bobby Abreu	1,990	594	1,396	
12	Ichiro Suzuki*	1,970	1,827	143	
13	Reggie Jackson*	1,942	1,942	0	
14	Dave Winfield*	1,883	1,000	883	
15	Paul O'Neill	1,848	1,163	685	
16	Dave Parker*	1,792	1	1,791	
17	Larry Walker*	1,718	0	1,718	
18	Magglio Ordóñez	1,713	1,713	0	
19	Sam Crawford* †	1,675	1,415	260	Held American League record, 1912–1920
20	Jermaine Dye	1,671	1,600	71	
21	Sam Rice*	1,649	1,649	0	
22	Shawn Green	1,630	569	1,061	
23	Jason Heyward	1,608	16	1,592	
24	Vladimir Guerrero*	1,605	615	990	
	Rusty Staub	1,605	137	1,468	
26	Wally Moses	1,587	1,587	0	
27	Johnny Callison	1,577	106	1,471	
28	Tom Brunansky	1,569	1,254	315	
29	Enos Slaughter*	1,540	196	1,344	
30	Harry Heilmann*	1,525	1,419	106	
31	Bobby Bonds	1,474	586	888	
32	Bill Nicholson	1,442	1	1,441	
33	Jay Bruce	1,437	65	1,372	
34	Rubén Sierra	1,425	1,413	12	
35	Hunter Pence	1,420	8	1,412	
36	Carl Furillo	1,409	0	1,409	
37	Jeromy Burnitz	1,365	153	1,212	
38	Jay Buhner	1,357	1,357	0	
39	Jesse Barfield	1,339	1,339	0	
40	Raúl Mondesí	1,325	463	862	
41	Tommy Griffith	1,319	0	1,319	
42	Ken Singleton	1,311	865	446	
43	Darryl Strawberry	1,308	18	1,290	
44	Chuck Klein*	1,307	0	1,307	
45	Al Cowens	1,292	1,292	0	
46	Jeff Francoeur	1,290	365	925	
47	Hank Bauer	1,289	1,289	0	
48	Rocky Colavito	1,282	1,269	13	
49	Andre Dawson*	1,281	20	1,261	
50	Frank Robinson*	1,270	648	622	
51	J. D. Drew	1,268	579	689	
52	Tim Salmon	1,263	1,263	0	
53	Alex Ríos	1,250	1,250	0	
54	José Guillén	1,211	522	689	
55	Jackie Jensen	1,205	1,205	0	
	John Titus	1,205	0	1,205	
57	Dixie Walker	1,202	169	1,033	
58	Ross Youngs*	1,192	0	1,192	
59	Frank Schulte	1,186	60	1,126	
60	Pete Fox	1,167	1,167	0	
61	Bruce Campbell	1,166	1,166	0	
62	Reggie Sanders	1,165	82	1,083	
63	Gary Sheffield	1,160	295	865	
64	Roger Maris	1,151	949	202	
65	Max Flack	1,146	0	1,044	Includes 102 in Federal League
66	Tony Oliva*	1,137	1,137	0	
67	Babe Ruth*	1,128	1,124	4	
	Jack Tobin	1,128	888	0	Includes 240 in Federal League
69	Curt Walker	1,123	0	1,123	
70	Josh Reddick	1,108	1,030	78	
71	Kole Calhoun	1,107	1,020	87	
72	Willie Keeler* †	1,102	844	258	Held major league record, 1906–1924
73	Claudell Washington	1,096	450	646	
74	**Nick Castellanos (19)**	1,080	252	828	
75	**Giancarlo Stanton (0)**	1,078	136	942	
76	José Bautista	1,071	957	114	
77	Sixto Lezcano	1,061	692	369	
78	Don Mueller	1,046	43	1,003	
79	Harold Baines*	1,042	1,042	0	
80	**Mookie Betts (0)**	1,022	585	437	
81	Jayson Werth	1,020	29	991	
82	Jack Clark	1,013	14	999	
83	Chief Wilson	1,005	0	1,005	
94	Babe Herman	994	0	994	
85	Bing Miller	992	992	0	
86	Ken Griffey	990	113	877	
	**Bryce Harper (43)**	990	0	990	
88	**Max Kepler (0)**	963	927	36	
89	Trot Nixon	961	956	5	
90	Elmer Valo	957	843	114	
91	Gavvy Cravath	955	16	939	
92	Kevin Bass	954	62	892	
93	Shin-Soo Choo	947	947	0	
94	Brian Jordan	945	44	901	
95	Glenn Wilson	940	222	718	
96	Shano Collins	933	933	0	
97	Elmer Flick* †	927	789	138	
98	Andre Ethier	922	0	922	
99	Ollie Brown	911	69	842	
100	Dante Bichette	908	319	589	

== Other Hall of Famers ==
Player	Games as a right fielder			Other leagues, notes
Player	MLB	American League	National League	Other leagues, notes
Casey Stengel*	899	0	899	
Kiki Cuyler*	816	0	816	
Billy Southworth*	808	4	804	
Stan Musial*	783	0	783	
King Kelly* †	742	0	733	Includes 5 in American Association, 4 in Players' League; held National League record, 1889–1891
Ty Cobb*	709	709	0	
Tommy McCarthy* †	647	0	178	Includes 462 in American Association, 7 in Union Association
Carlos Beltrán*	631	228	403	
Hugh Duffy* †	437	0	199	Includes 120 in the Players' League, 118 in American Association
Billy Williams*	381	0	381	
Andruw Jones*	224	109	115	
