= Andre Ethier =

American baseball player (born 1982)

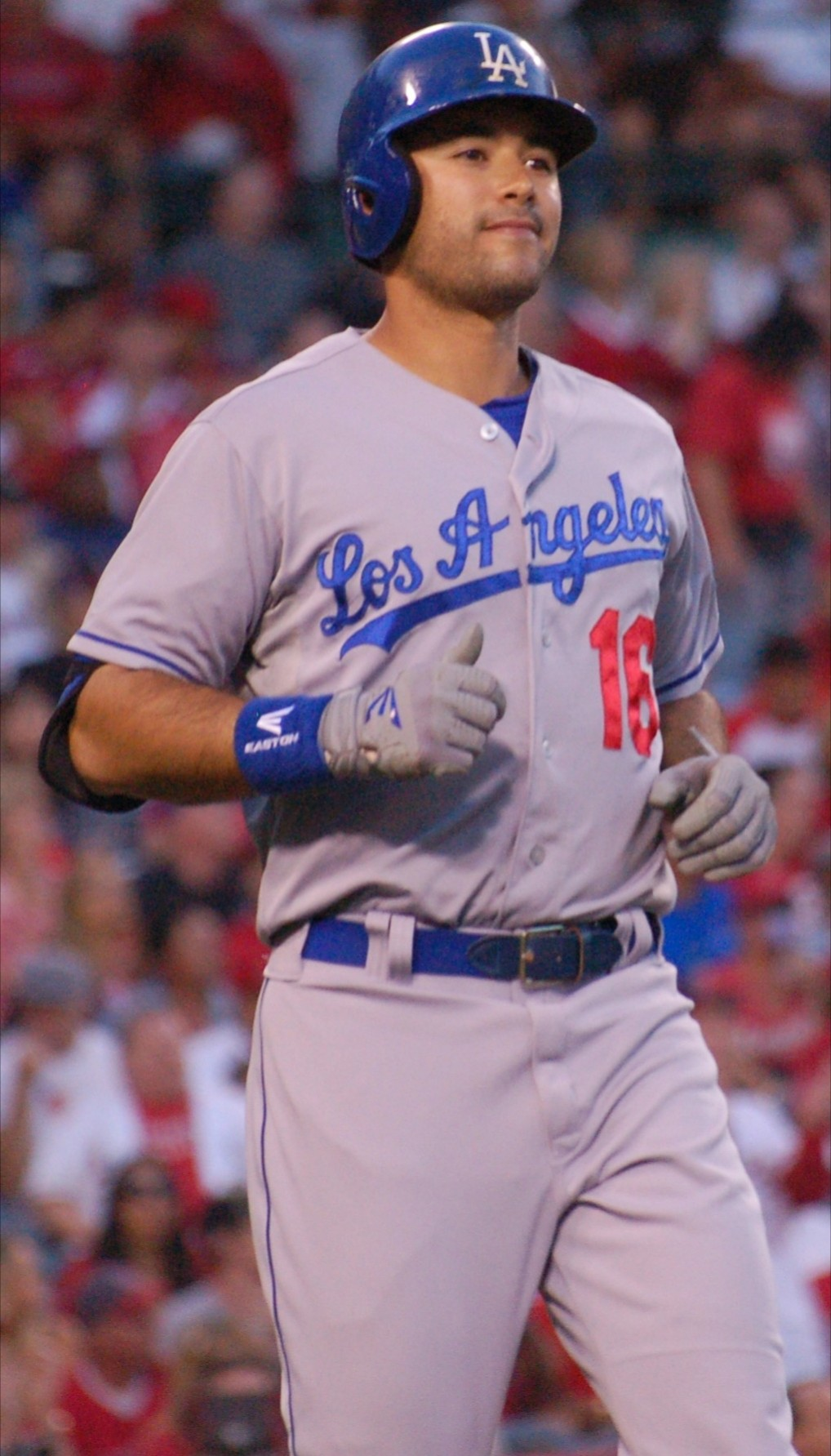
- Ethier with the Dodgers in 2013
- Outfielder
- Born: April 10, 1982 (age 44); Phoenix, Arizona, U.S.
- Batted: Left Threw: Left

MLB debut
- May 2, 2006, for the Los Angeles Dodgers

Last MLB appearance
- October 1, 2017, for the Los Angeles Dodgers

MLB statistics
- Batting average: .285
- Home runs: 162
- Runs batted in: 687
- Stats at Baseball Reference

Teams
- Los Angeles Dodgers (2006–2017)

Career highlights and awards
- 2× All-Star (2010, 2011); Gold Glove Award (2011); Silver Slugger Award (2009)

Andre Everett Ethier (/ˈiːθiər/; born April 10, 1982) is an American former professional baseball outfielder. He played in Major League Baseball (MLB) for the Los Angeles Dodgers from 2006 to 2017.

Drafted in the second round (62nd pick overall) of the 2003 MLB draft by the Oakland Athletics, Ethier played in the major leagues from 2006 through 2017, all for the Dodgers. Career highlights include All-Star selections in 2010 and 2011, a Silver Slugger Award in 2009, and a Gold Glove Award in 2011. Primarily a right fielder throughout his career, Ethier also filled in at left field and center field for the Dodgers. Due to leg and back injuries, he had only 58 at bats in the 2016 and 2017 regular seasons, combined.

== Early life ==
Andre Everett Ethier was born on April 10, 1982, in Phoenix, Arizona. Ethier attended St Mary's High School in Phoenix in Phoenix.

His grandfather, Pierre "Pete" Ethier, played professional minor league baseball, reaching as high as the AAA level. Andre Ethier's father, Byron Ethier, was also a baseball player and was coached under legend Gary Ward at Yavapai JC; he went as far as winning a JC national title while playing there. One of his three brothers, Devon, also played baseball at Gateway Community College and was drafted by the Dodgers in the 32nd round of the 2010 MLB draft.

== College career ==
Ethier transferred to Chandler-Gilbert Community College after playing with Arizona State University in the fall of 2000. The coaching staff at ASU told him that they thought he did not have Division I talent, and that he would do better to play junior college ball. At CGCC, Ethier batted .468 and accumulated 94 hits, 32 of which were doubles. He was named team MVP. During the summer of 2001, he played with the Keene Swamp Bats in the New England Collegiate Baseball League. In 2010, Ethier was inducted into the NECBL Hall of Fame.

Ethier re-enrolled at ASU in the fall of 2001 and played there until the end of his junior year in 2003 with an ASU career batting average of .371, 113 runs, 27 doubles, 7 triples, 14 home runs and 118 runs batted in. His collegiate career ended in the midst of a 23-game hitting streak. He was a two-time Pacific-10 Conference All-Star in 2002–03.

While at ASU he was a teammate and good friends with Dustin Pedroia and Ian Kinsler.

During the summer of 2002, Ethier played with the Rochester Honkers of the Northwoods League, a summer collegiate baseball league. Ethier led the team with 34 RBIs and won a Silver Glove for his play in right field.

== Professional career ==
=== Draft and minor leagues ===
Ethier was drafted by the Oakland Athletics in the 37th round of the 2001 amateur draft. Opting to attend ASU instead, he was drafted in the second round of the 2003 amateur draft, again by the Oakland Athletics. He signed with the Athletics on July 1, 2003.

Oakland assigned him to the Single-A Vancouver Canadians and later to the Kane County Cougars for the 2003 season. His minor-league career continued in 2004 with the Modesto Athletics, where he hit .313, and in 2005 with the Midland RockHounds Double-A team, where he hit .319 with 18 homers and was selected as the Texas League Most Valuable Player, Oakland Athletics Minor League Player of the Year, Texas League All-Star Outfielder and Texas League All-Star Game MVP. He also played four games in 2005 with the Sacramento River Cats Triple-A team.

On December 13, 2005, Ethier was traded by the Oakland Athletics to the Los Angeles Dodgers for Milton Bradley and Antonio Perez.

=== Los Angeles Dodgers (2006–2017) ===
==== 2006 ====
Ethier hit a double and drew a walk in his Major League Baseball debut with the Los Angeles Dodgers on May 2, 2006, against the Arizona Diamondbacks in his home state of Arizona and hit his first home run the next night, against Dewon Brazelton of the San Diego Padres.

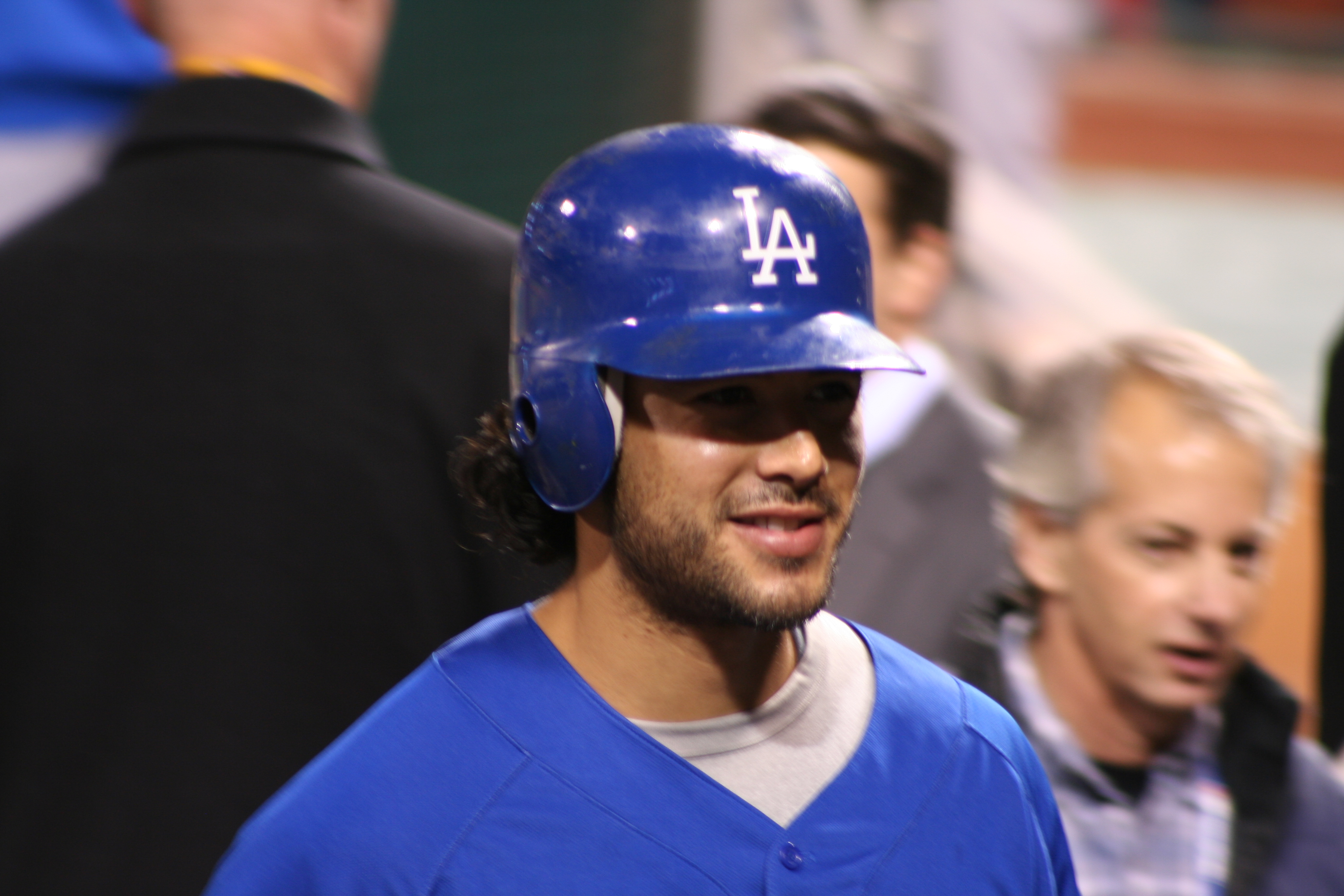
Ethier in 2008

On May 19, Ethier had a breakout game, going 5-for-5 with four runs scored as he raised his batting average from .222 to .317. He remained hot throughout the summer and was named National League Player of the Week for the week ending July 9. Ethier's average peaked at .354 before a late slump dropped it to .308 at season's end. An early front-runner for the National League Rookie of the Year Award, he finished fifth in voting.

==== 2007 ====
Ethier entered the 2007 season expecting to split time with Matt Kemp, and Luis Gonzalez in the outfield, but Ethier got a lot of playing time early due to an injury to Kemp. Although he began the season fairly slowly, hitting for a .250 average in April, over the course of the first three months to the season he managed to gradually raise his average. Overall, Ethier played in 153 games while batting .284, with 13 home runs, and 64 RBIs.

==== 2008 ====
Ethier beat out Juan Pierre to become the Dodgers' starting left fielder for the start of the 2008 season. When the Dodgers acquired outfielder Manny Ramirez, he moved to his more natural position of right field, with Kemp playing center field. In the regular season, Ethier played in 141 games, had 525 at bats, scored 90 runs, had 160 hits, and recorded a .305 batting average with 20 homers and 77 RBIs.

==== 2009 ====
In 2009, Ethier hit .272 with a career-best 31 home runs and 106 RBI. For this performance, Ethier won a Silver Slugger Award and finished sixth in National League MVP voting. Ethier was a key contributor for the Dodgers that season, with six walk off hits (including four walk off home runs), the most by any player in the Major Leagues since 1974. His four walk-off home runs tied the Major League record for most in a season. On June 26, 2009, Ethier hit three home runs in a game against the Seattle Mariners, driving in a career-high six runs.

==== 2010 ====
Ethier got off to a strong start to the 2010 season, leading the National League in home runs, RBIs, and batting average, but broke his pinky finger on his right hand during batting practice on May 15, and was placed on the 15-day disabled list three days later. On July 4, Ethier was selected to start on the National League All Star team, with more than 2.7 million votes. He slumped down the stretch, finishing with a .292 batting average, 23 home runs, and 82 RBIs in 139 games.

==== 2011 ====
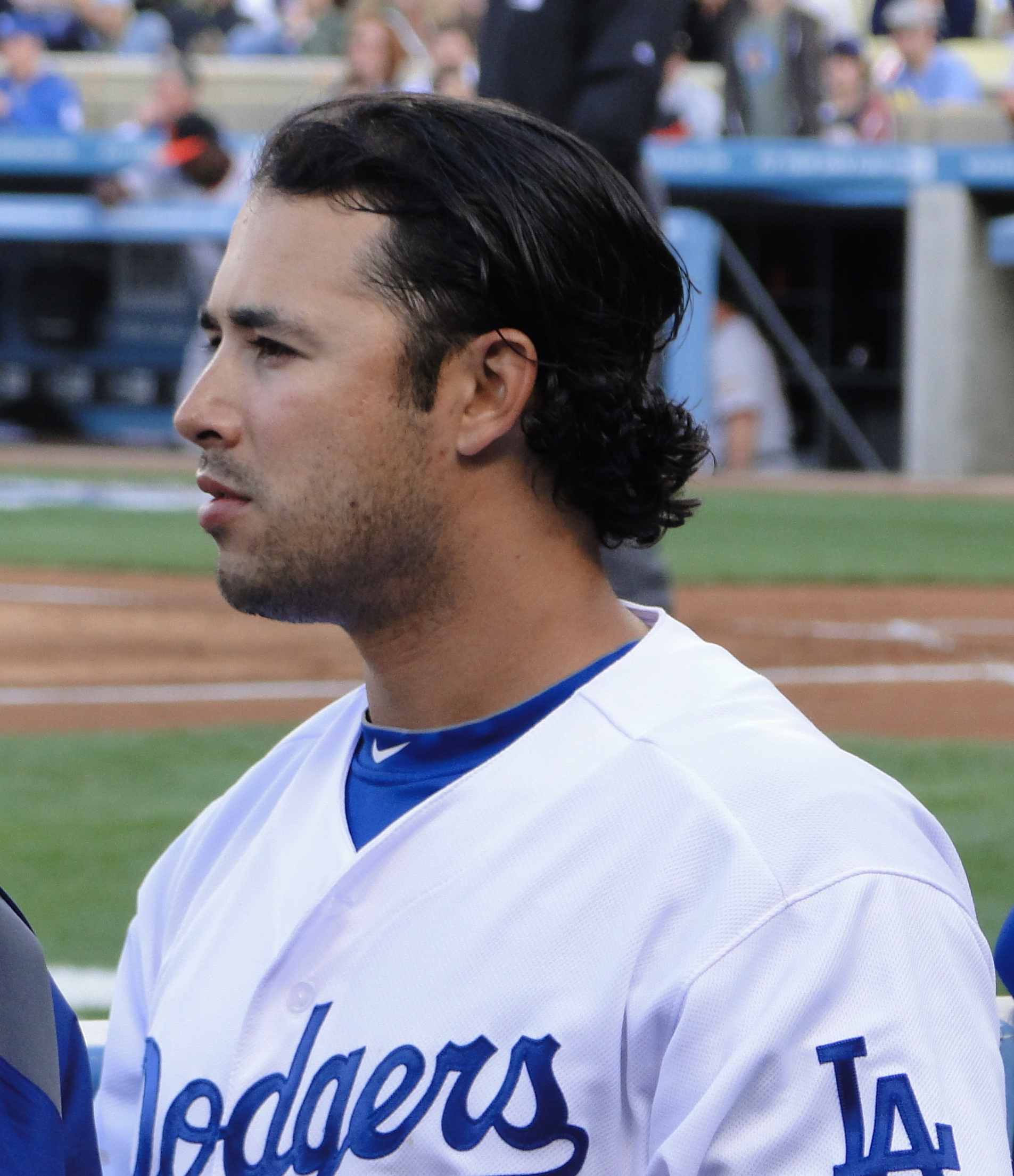
Ethier in 2011

Ethier set a new MLB record for April on April 26 against the Florida Marlins with a 23-game hitting streak, breaking the old record set by Joe Torre. On April 30 Ethier extended his streak to 27 games, moving past two former Dodgers to stand in second place in the franchise's history of hitting streaks and tie the Dodgers record for the most hits in April. The streak eventually reached 30 games, second-most in Dodger franchise history, before it ended on May 7 against the New York Mets. Ethier was a Final Vote candidate for the 2011 Major League Baseball All-Star Game, but finished second to Shane Victorino of the Philadelphia Phillies. However, Victorino was injured and unable to participate so Ethier was selected to replace him on the All-Star roster.

Ethier became the subject of some controversy in the second half of the season. Los Angeles Times columnist TJ Simers wrote an article that quoted Ethier as saying his production was down in 2011 because of a knee injury that he had been battling all season, and implying that the Dodgers were forcing him to play despite his injury. Manager Don Mattingly said he was "blindsided" by the story, and responded that he would never make a player play hurt. After a meeting with Mattingly and GM Ned Colletti, Ethier backed off on his comments and said it was his choice to play hurt.

After the September 7 game, Ethier decided to shut down for the season in order to consult doctors on the problems with his knee, with the hope of getting healthy in time for spring training. Ethier appeared in 135 games with the Dodgers in 2011, hitting .291 with 11 home runs and 62 RBIs.

Ethier won a Gold Glove Award on November 1, 2011. Clayton Kershaw and Matt Kemp also won Gold Gloves, giving the Dodgers three Gold Glove winners in one year for the first time in franchise history.

==== 2012 ====
On June 12, Ethier signed a five-year contract extension with the Dodgers. The deal was for $85 million through 2017 with a $17.5 million vesting option for 2018.

On August 25, Ethier got his tenth straight base hit, breaking the L.A. Dodger record set by Ron Cey in 1977 and tying the franchise record set by Ed Konetchy in 1919. On September 4 against the San Diego Padres, Ethier collected his 1,000th career hit on a solo homer in the 2nd inning.

He played in 149 games in 2012, hitting .284 with 20 homers and 89 RBI.

==== 2013 ====
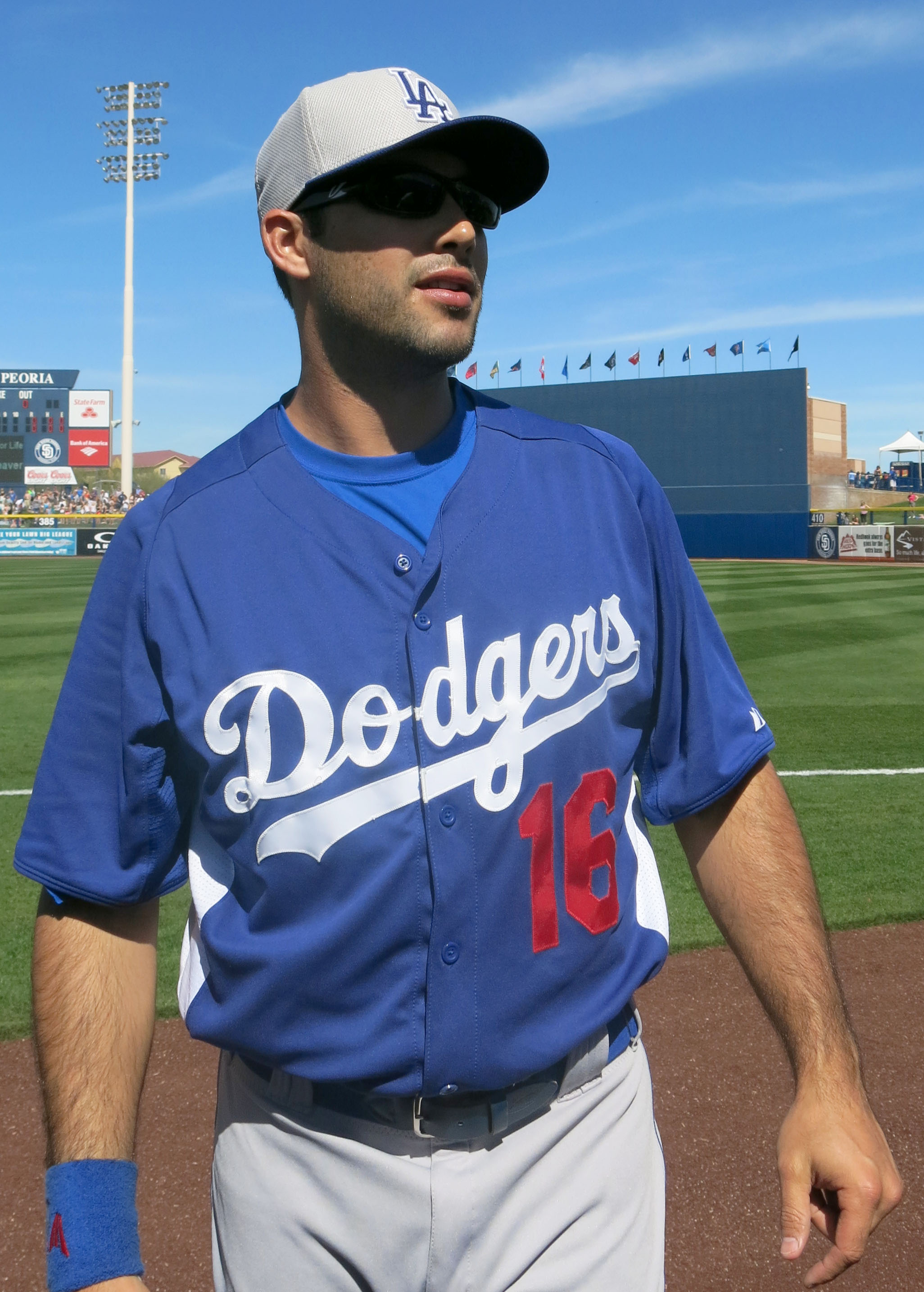
Ethier at a 2013 spring training game against the Seattle Mariners in Peoria, Arizona.

After being a corner outfielder for his entire career, Ethier was moved to center field for the first time in the Majors in 2013 because of injuries to Matt Kemp. On September 2, Ethier became the first player in Dodger history to record seven seasons with 30 or more doubles. His season though took a quick step back after getting injured. Beginning September 13, Ethier wore a walking boot for a sore foot that caused him to miss several games at the end of the season and limited him in the playoffs. For the entire season he played 142 games and hit .272 with 12 homers, 33 doubles, and 52 RBIs.

==== 2014 ====
In late May, Ethier was once again moved to center field, becoming the starting center fielder for the Dodgers due to Kemp's defensive struggles. However, with Yasiel Puig moving to center field and Kemp's resurgence in right field, Ethier became a reserve for most of the second half of the season.

General Manager Ned Colletti said he believed Ethier could become a needed late-inning power bat. His teammates praised him throughout the season for accepting his role and not creating problems, despite his rich contract. The Los Angeles Times mentioned that Ethier was able to remain completely professional over the entire situation, unlike some past Dodger players who would publicly complain about getting less time on the field and possibly losing their positions. Ethier continued to show up for the pre-game autographs and photos, continuing to remain normal and popular among his fans.

Ethier played only 130 games, the fewest in his career since his rookie season, hitting .249/.322/.370 with 4 home runs and 42 RBIs, mostly in pinch-hit scenarios.

==== 2015 ====
Due to early-season injuries to outfielders Puig and Carl Crawford, Ethier established himself as a near-everyday player in the first half of the season. On August 2, he hit two go-ahead home runs against the Angels, including a walk-off home run in the 10th inning, to earn the Dodgers their first three-game sweep over their city rivals since 2006. It was the seventh walk-off home run, and 14th walk-off hit, of Ethier's career, which placed him second all-time in franchise history behind only the 16 by Dusty Baker. He played in 142 games and hit .294 with 14 home runs and 53 RBI.

==== 2016 ====
During spring training, Ethier suffered a fractured right tibia after fouling a ball off his shin in a game. The injury did not require surgery but he was expected to be out for 10–14 weeks. The injury was more severe than expected and Ethier did not rejoin the Dodgers' roster until September 10. He only appeared in 16 games, primarily as a pinch hitter, down the stretch, with five hits in 24 at-bats including one home run, batting .208/.269/.375. Ethier had six at-bats as a pinch hitter for the Dodgers in the playoffs with two hits, one of which was a home run.

==== 2017 ====
For the second straight year, Ethier was injured during spring training. This time, he came down with a herniated disc in his back and again began the season on the disabled list. Ethier did not rejoin the Dodgers' active roster until September 1. In 34 at bats, he batted .235/.316/.441. Ethier was used as a pinch hitter primarily in the playoffs. In Game 6 of the 2017 World Series, he appeared in his 50th career post-season game, a new Dodgers franchise record. After the season, the Dodgers declined their 2018 option on Ethier, making him a free agent for the first time in his career.

On November 26, 2017, Ethier announced he would retire. Hours later, he reversed the original announcement, and remained unsigned. On July 25, 2018, Ethier officially announced his retirement and the Dodgers announced that he would have a retirement ceremony on August 3 prior to the game against the Houston Astros.

==== Career statistics ====
In 1455 games over 12 seasons, Ethier posted a .285 batting average (1367-for-4800) with 641 runs, 303 doubles, 34 triples, 162 home runs, 687 RBI, 519 bases on balls, .359 on-base percentage and .463 slugging percentage. He finished his career with a .986 fielding percentage playing at all three outfield positions. In 51 postseason games, he batted .246 (31-for-126) with 18 runs, 6 doubles, 5 home runs, 11 RBI and 18 walks.

== Personal life ==
While attending Arizona State University (ASU), Andre met Maggie Germaine, a former ASU gymnast. She set school records while at ASU with a total of nine perfect 10.0 scores. The couple married in 2006 and have three sons and a daughter. On October 17–18, 2014, Andre and his wife were honored as the first husband-wife inductees in the Arizona State Sports Hall of Fame.

Ethier and his family live in the Arcadia neighborhood of Phoenix, Arizona. He is Catholic and attends Mass regularly. Maggie is a member of The Church of Jesus Christ of Latter-Day Saints.

== See also ==
- List of Major League Baseball career games played as a right fielder leaders
- List of Major League Baseball hit records
- List of Major League Baseball players who spent their entire career with one franchise
- Athletics award winners and league leaders
- Los Angeles Dodgers award winners and league leaders
