= Tlmače =

- Municipality
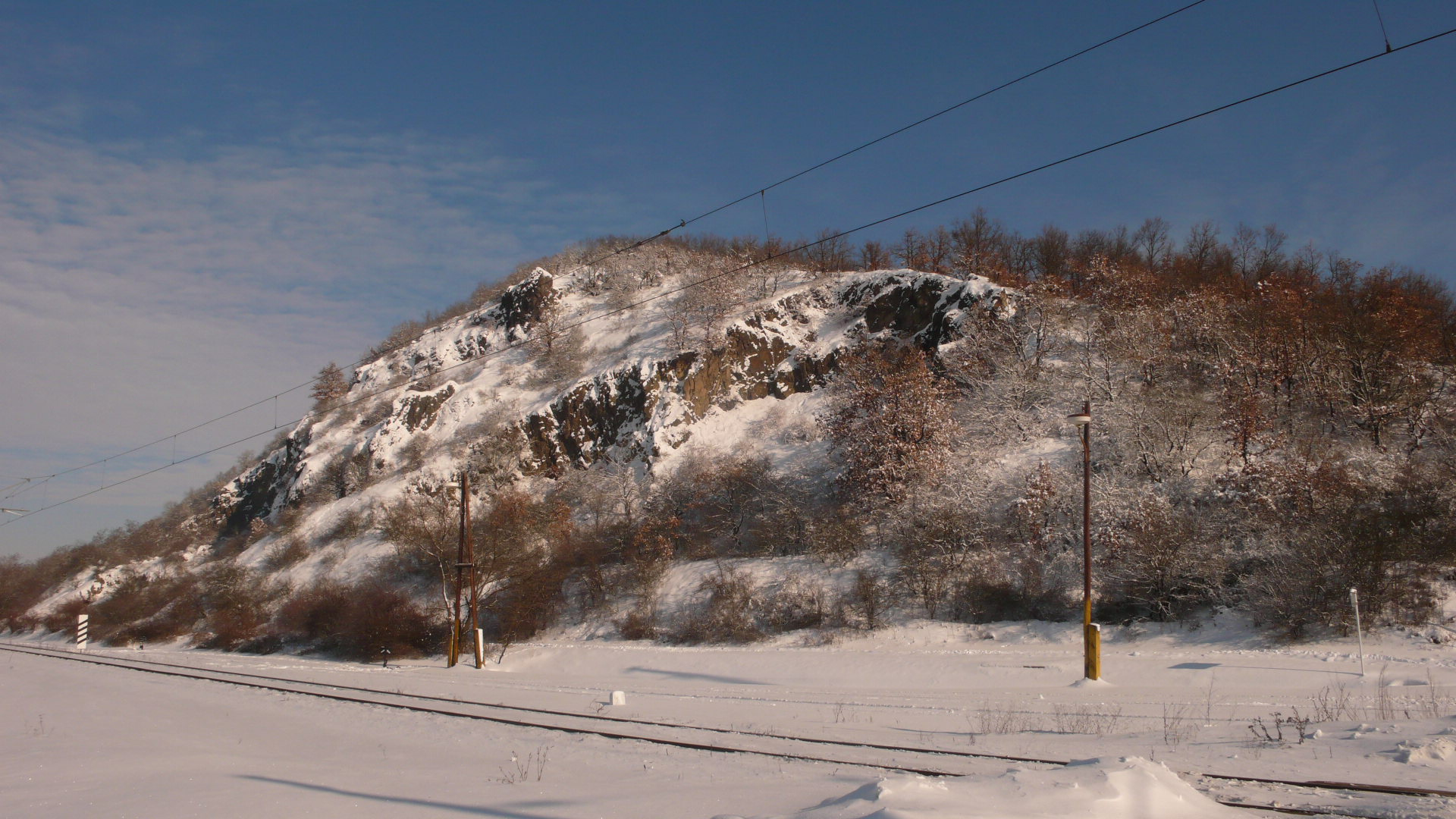
- Hill Kusá Hora near Tlmače

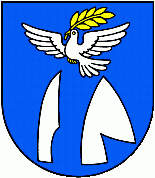
- Flag Coat of arms

- Location of Tlmače in the Nitra Region Location of Tlmače in Slovakia
- Coordinates: 48.29°N 18.53°E
- Country: Slovakia
- Region: Nitra Region
- District: Levice District
- First mentioned: 1075

Government
  - Mayor: Miroslav Kupči

Area
  - Total: 4.64 km^{2} (1.79 sq mi)
- Elevation: 189 m (620 ft)

Population (2025)
  - Total: 3,446
- Time zone: UTC+1 (CET)
  - Summer (DST): UTC+2 (CEST)
- Postal code: 935 21
- Area code: +421 36
- Vehicle registration plate (until 2022): LV
- Website: www.mestotlmace.sk

Tlmače is a town and municipality in the Levice District in the Nitra Region of Slovakia.

== History ==
In historical records the town was first mentioned in 1075 as Talmach. It has town status since 1986. From 1986 to 1994 the villages of Malé Kozmálovce and Veľké Kozmálovce were part of the town.

== Geography ==
The municipality lies at an altitude of 189 metres (620 ft) and covers an area of 4.64 km^{2} (1.79 sq mi) (2025).

== Population ==
Population statistic (10 years)
Year	1995	2005	2015	2025
Count	4296	4172	3668	3446
Difference		−2.88%	−12.08%	−6.05%

Population statistic
Year	2024	2025
Count	3507	3446
Difference		−1.73%

It has a population of 3446 people (31 December 2025).

=== Ethnicity ===
Census 2021 (1+ %)
Ethnicity	Number	Fraction
Slovak	3338	91.77%
Not found out	250	6.87%
Hungarian	48	1.31%
Total	3637	

In year 2021 was 3637 people by ethnicity 3338 as Slovak, 250 as Not found out, 48 as Hungarian, 28 as Czech, 11 as Other, 8 as Rusyn, 6 as German, 5 as Russian, 4 as Ukrainian, 4 as Italian, 3 as Vietnamese, 3 as Romani, 3 as Moravian, 2 as Irish, 2 as English, 1 as Jewish, 1 as Romanian, 1 as Austrian, 1 as Polish and 1 as Croatian.

Note on population: The difference values of population numbers in the table "Population statistic" and in the sections "Ethnicity" & "Religion" is caused by the use of various statistical methods.

=== Religion ===
Census 2021 (1+ %)
Religion	Number	Fraction
Roman Catholic Church	1994	54.83%
None	1074	29.53%
Not found out	294	8.08%
Evangelical Church	161	4.43%
Total	3637	

In year 2021 was 3637 people by religion 1994 from Roman Catholic Church, 1074 from None, 294 from Not found out, 161 from Evangelical Church, 27 from Greek Catholic Church, 20 from Ad hoc movements, 15 from Christian Congregations in Slovakia, 11 from Calvinist Church, 9 from Other, 7 from Buddhism, 6 from Jehovah's Witnesses, 5 from Eastern Orthodox Church, 4 from Other and not ascertained christian church, 3 from Hinduism, 3 from United Methodist Church, 2 from Paganism and natural spirituality, 1 from Bahá'i Community and 1 from Apostolic Church.

According to the 2001 census, the town had 4,305 inhabitants. 96.10% of inhabitants were Slovaks, 1.42% Hungarians, 1.02% Czechs and 0.53% Roma. The religious make-up was 72.45% Roman Catholics, 17.44% people with no religious affiliation, and 5.46% Lutherans.

== Facilities ==
The town has a public library, a cinema, a gym and football stadium. Adding to the facilities, the town has a motocross track, which has hosted international events. It has a pharmacy and doctor's surgery and a specialized outpatient facility for adolescents and children. The town has a number of food and general stores and a petrol station.

The town has its own birth registry office and police force. It is also connected by railway.

== Sports and cultural events ==
The town organised an annual road race known as the Tlmačská dvadsaťpäťka (Tlmače 25). Since 2014 its distance has been limited to a half marathon and the event is known as the Tlmačský polmaratón (Tlmače half marathon). Its 40th edition was held in 2023.

The town had its own football club, FKM Tlmače, which was unable to play in the town due to an ownership dispute over the football pitch between 2011 and 2013. The town was represented in the national Extraliga for men's tennis, finishing last and being relegated in 2009.

The town also organised an annual theatre festival known as Tlmačské činohranie. This event is a three-day event in which amateur theatre groups from different cities of Slovakia actively participate.

== Gallery ==
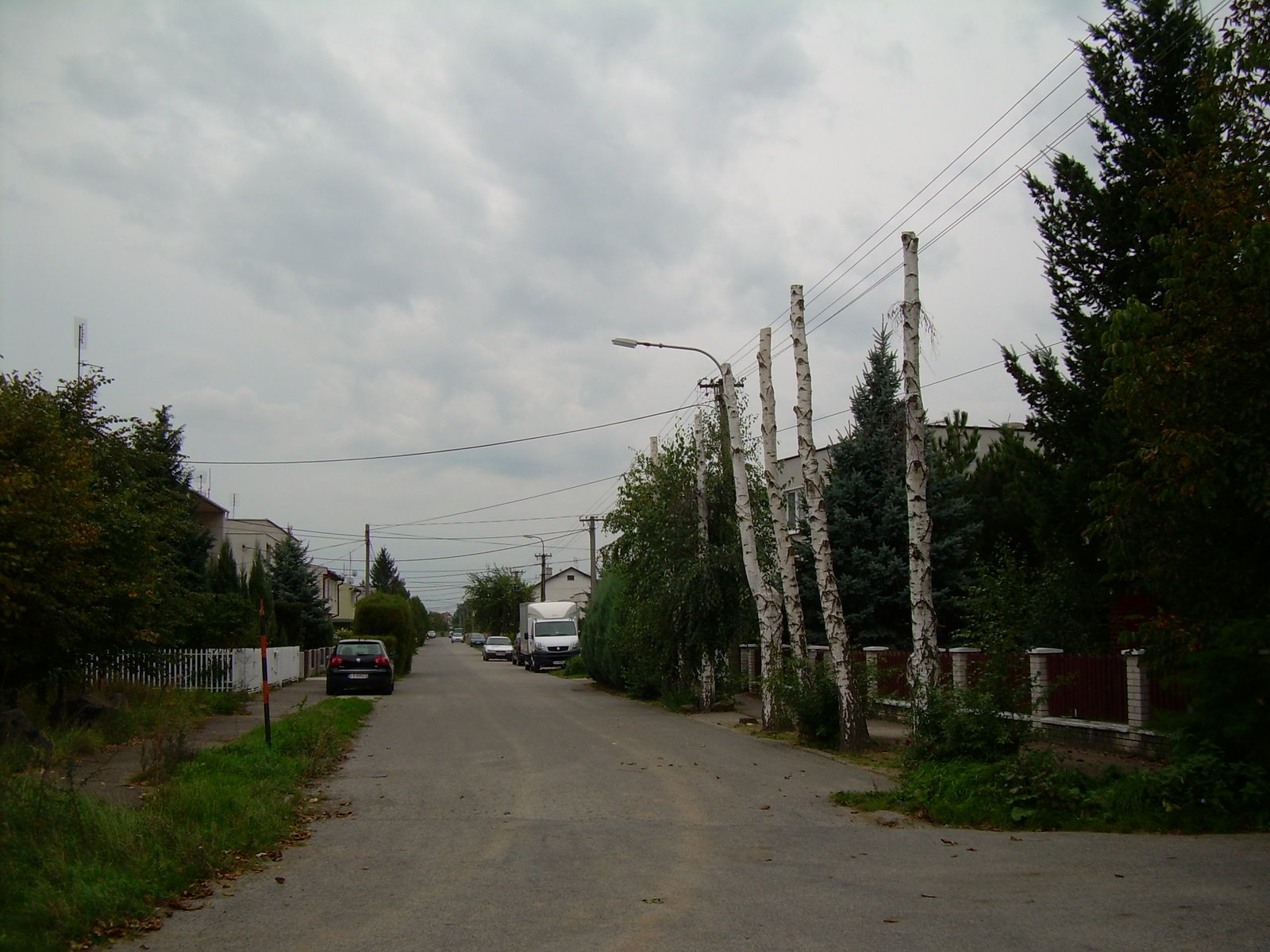
A view of the Cintorinska street, Tlmace

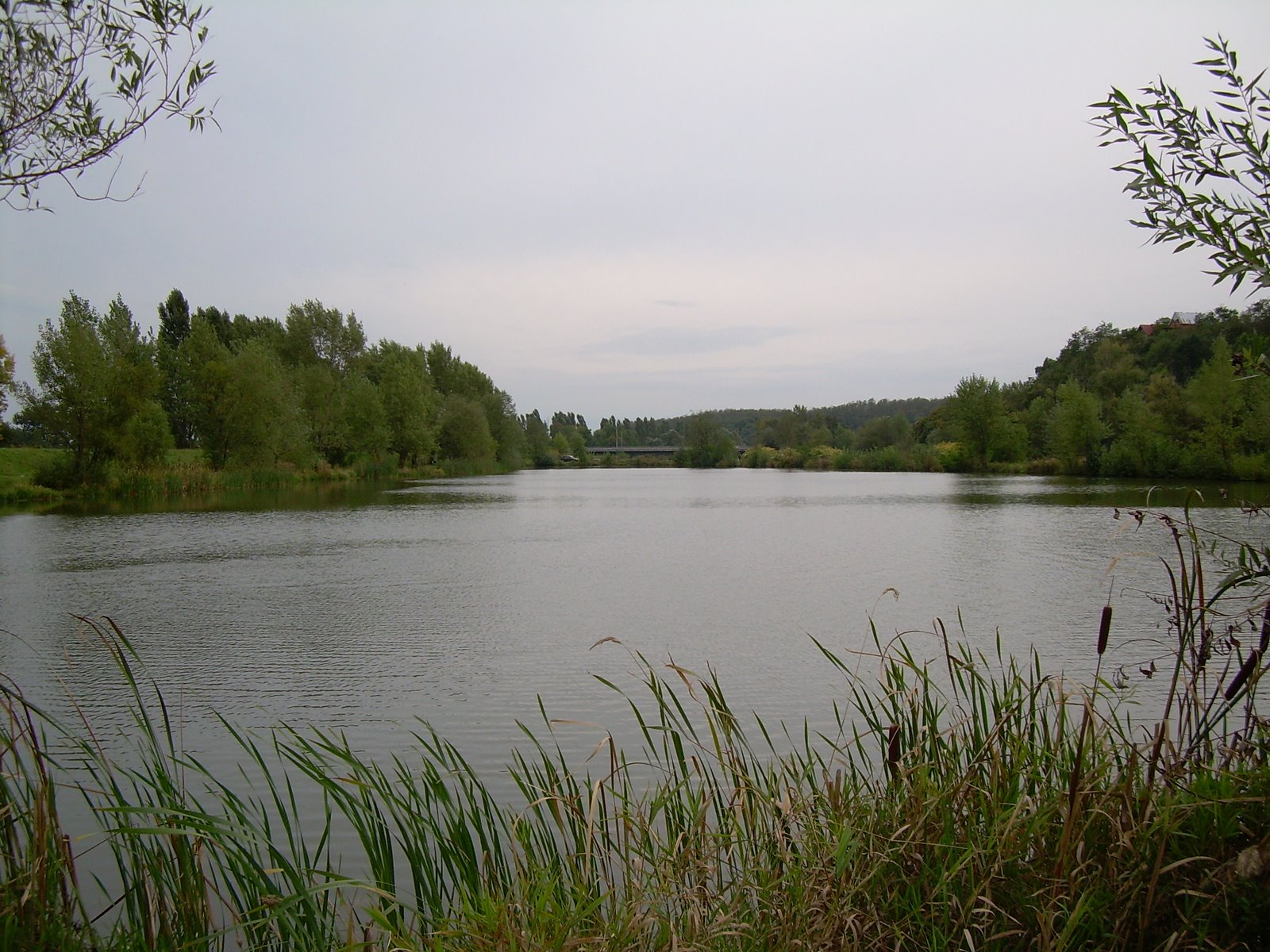
The lake near the river Hron, Tlmace
