= Hunter Pence =

American baseball player (born 1983)

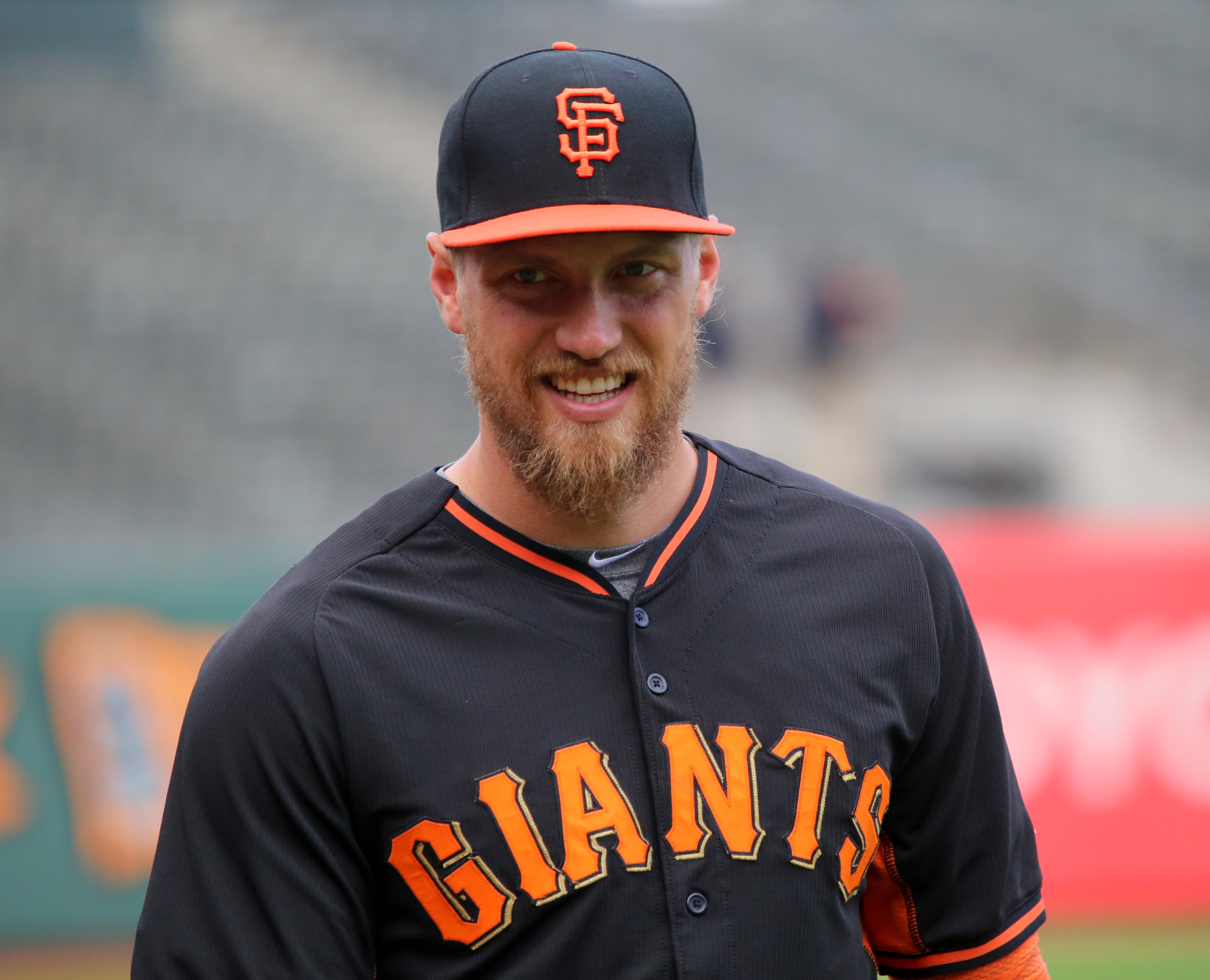
- Pence with the Giants in 2015
- Right fielder
- Born: April 13, 1983 (age 43); Fort Worth, Texas, U.S.
- Batted: Right Threw: Right

MLB debut
- April 28, 2007, for the Houston Astros

Last MLB appearance
- August 21, 2020, for the San Francisco Giants

MLB statistics
- Batting average: .279
- Home runs: 244
- Runs batted in: 942
- Stats at Baseball Reference

Teams
- Houston Astros (2007–2011); Philadelphia Phillies (2011–2012); San Francisco Giants (2012–2018); Texas Rangers (2019); San Francisco Giants (2020)

Career highlights and awards
- 4× All-Star (2009, 2011, 2014, 2019); 2× World Series champion (2012, 2014); San Francisco Giants Wall of Fame

Hunter Andrew Pence (born April 13, 1983), nicknamed "the Reverend," is an American former professional baseball right fielder and designated hitter. He played in Major League Baseball (MLB) for the Houston Astros, Philadelphia Phillies, San Francisco Giants, and Texas Rangers. In the 2004 Major League Baseball draft he was drafted in the second round by the Astros. Pence made his major league debut in 2007. He is a four time All-Star and was a member of the 2012 and 2014 World Series championship teams with the Giants.

== Early life ==
Hunter Andrew Pence was born on April 13, 1983, in Fort Worth, Texas. Pence attended Arlington High School in Arlington, Texas, where he excelled in baseball. After playing outfield his first three years, he moved to shortstop his senior year.

== College career ==
He attended Texarkana College in Texarkana, Texas for a year and was a designated hitter on the baseball team.

He transferred to the University of Texas at Arlington (UTA) where he returned to the outfield for the UT Arlington Mavericks. He hit .347 as a sophomore in 2003 and was named a first-team all-conference outfielder. Despite missing 15 of UTA's 30 Southland Conference games in 2004 due to an injury at mid-season, he was named the 2004 Southland Conference player of the year, leading the league with a .395 batting average. Pence still holds the conference record for doubles in a single series, with five.

== Professional career ==
=== Drafts and minor leagues ===
Pence was drafted by the Milwaukee Brewers in the 40th round of the 2002 Major League Baseball draft but did not sign. In the 2004 Major League Baseball draft he was drafted in the second round (64th pick overall) by the Houston Astros from the University of Texas at Arlington. He played the 2004 season with the single A Tri-City ValleyCats in Troy, New York. Also in the same year, Pence, along with future major leaguer Ben Zobrist helped lead the 'Cats to a 50-win season in the New York–Penn League, the second-most in ValleyCats history. In 2004, the 'Cats defeated the Brooklyn Cyclones in the first round, but lost to the Mahoning Valley Scrappers in the league championship.

In 2006 with the AA Corpus Christi Hooks, Pence batted .283/.357/.533 and hit 28 home runs, with 95 RBIs. He had 17 stolen bases, while being caught stealing only 4 times. In 2006, he was one of three outfielders named to the Baseball America Minor League All-Star Team. Pence began the 2007 season as the AAA Round Rock Express' center fielder, though he made a serious run to make the big league club out of spring training.

=== Houston Astros (2007–2011) ===
==== 2007 ====
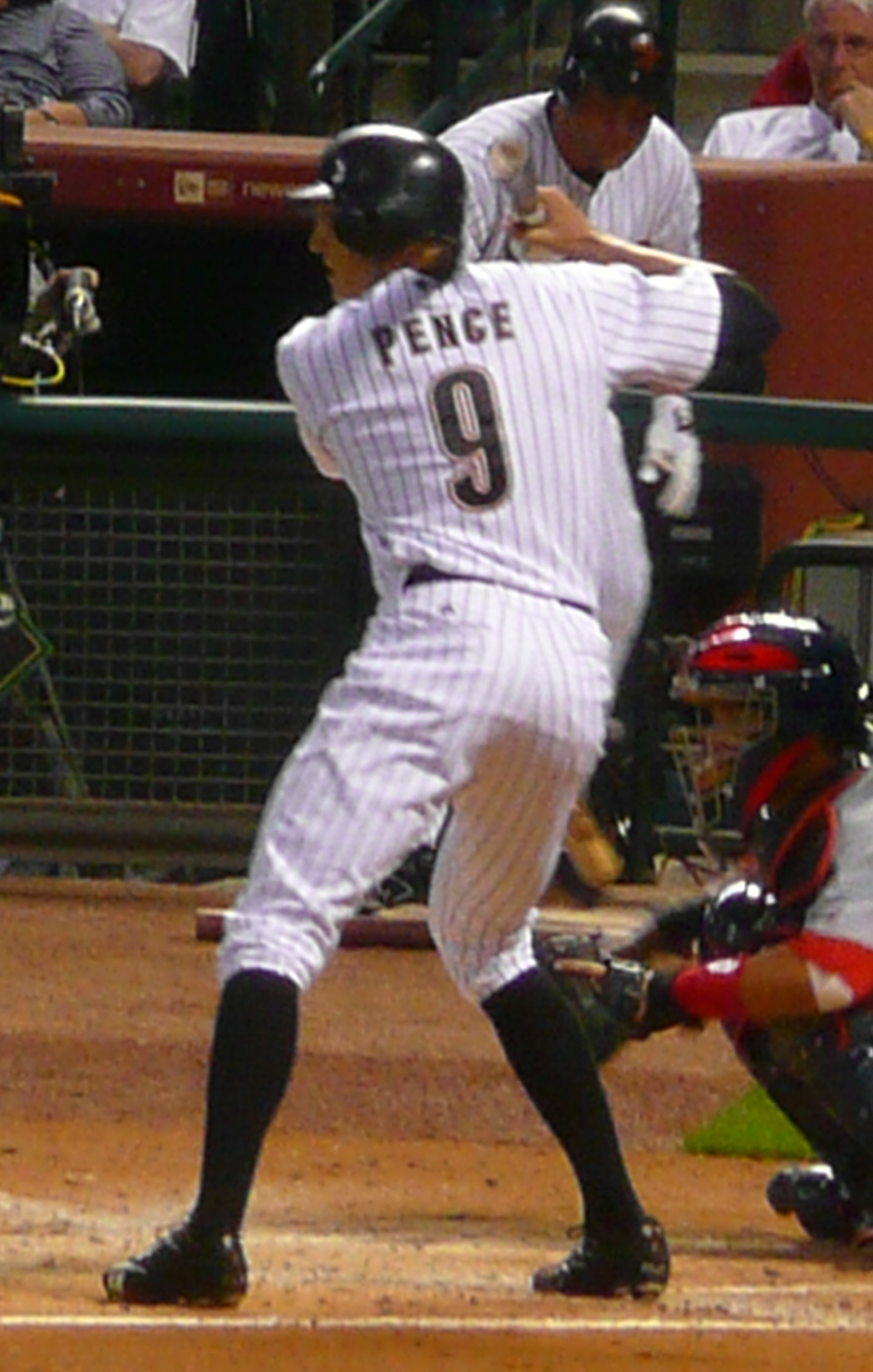
Pence at-bat in 2008

Pence made his major league debut as the Houston Astros center fielder on April 28, 2007, versus the Milwuakee Brewers and got his first major league hit and scored his first run. Pence's first home run in the majors was a grand slam, against the St. Louis Cardinals on May 5. Pence hit a dramatic walk-off home run against José Mesa of the Philadelphia Phillies in the bottom of the 13th inning at Minute Maid Park on July 3 in a 5–4 win. It was Mesa's only pitch of the game. Pence was named National League co-Player of the Week for May 14–20, after recording a 1.091 slugging percentage and .625 on-base percentage with 2 home runs and 5 RBIs.

On July 23, general manager Tim Purpura announced that Pence would be out with a small chipped bone fracture in his right wrist. On August 21, Pence was activated from the disabled list. At that point, despite having missed a month he was 4th among NL rookies in at bats. Pence led NL rookies in triples (9), and was 2nd to Ryan Braun in batting average (.322), on-base percentage (.360), slugging percentage (.539), and OPS (.899).

Pence was a unanimous selection to the 2007 Topps Major League Rookie All-Star Team. The selection was the result of the 49th annual Topps balloting of Major League managers. Pence (15 points) came in third, and lost out to Braun (128 points) in the vote for the 2007 NL Sporting News Rookie of the Year Award by 488 major league players and 30 managers. He also lost out to Braun in the competition for the 2007 Baseball America Rookie of the Year Award, in the vote for the 2007 Players Choice NL Most Outstanding Rookie by their fellow major league players, and in the Baseball Prospectus 2007 Internet Baseball NL Rookie of the Year Award, with 16 first place votes, versus 666 for Braun.

==== 2008–2011 ====
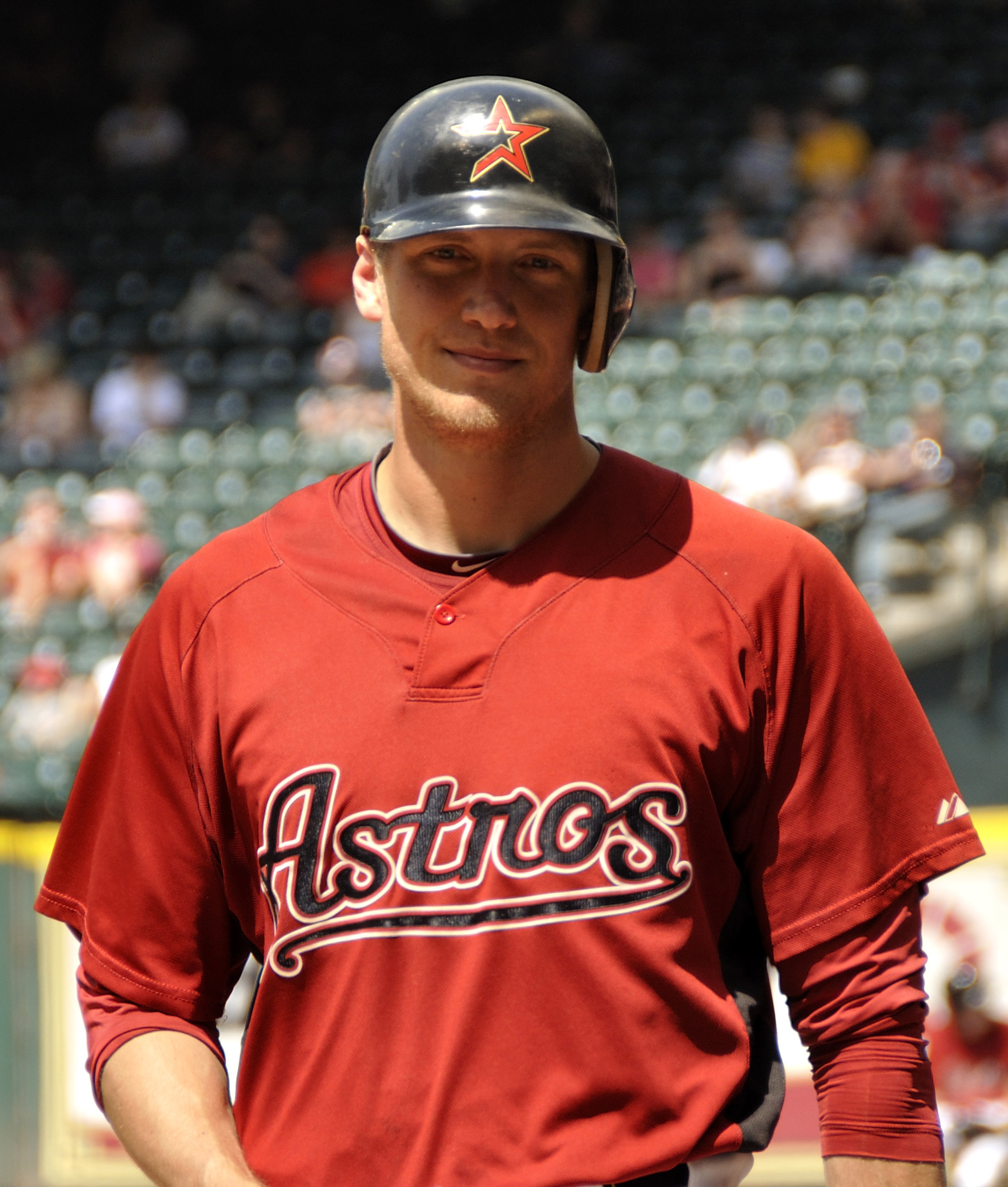
Pence on April 3, 2010

After Michael Bourn was traded to the Astros from the Phillies, Pence moved to right field while Bourn took over in center. In his sophomore season, Pence set new personal single-season records in home runs (25), runs batted in (83), doubles (25), hits (160), and at bats (595). However, his batting average dipped to .269, his on-base percentage fell to .318, and his slugging percentage also fell to .466. Pence led the league in outfield assists with 16, committed 1 error, and had a fielding percentage of .997.

In his third season (2009), Pence was named an All-Star for the first time. In his fourth season (2010), he batted .282 with 25 home runs, drove in 91 RBIS and played 156 games. For the week of August 30 – September 5, 2010, Pence was named National League Player of the Week for the second time in his career after batting .500 (11-for-22) and slugging .909 with two home runs.

Pence was named an All-Star as a reserve in 2011, the second time he made the All-Star team. He was brought into the middle of the game, threw out José Bautista from the outfield, and scored the National League's 5th run of the game. At the All-Star break, Pence was batting .321 with 10 home runs and 59 RBIs.

=== Philadelphia Phillies (2011–2012) ===
==== 2011 ====
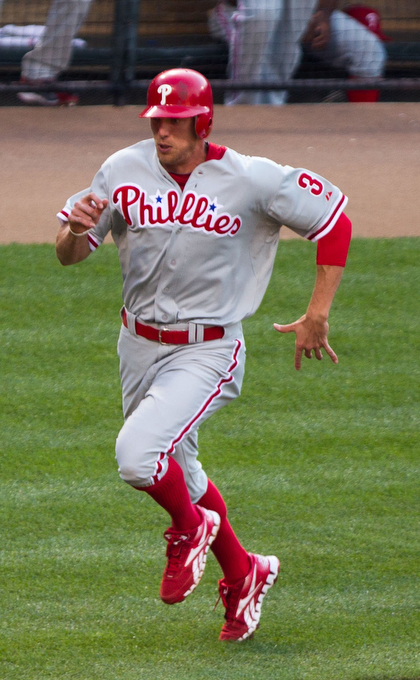
Pence on June 8, 2012

On July 29, 2011, the Houston Astros traded Pence to the Philadelphia Phillies for four minor-league players: first baseman Jonathan Singleton, right-handers Jarred Cosart and Josh Zeid, and a player to be named later, determined to be outfielder Domingo Santana. On August 4 at AT&T Park, in a 3–0 win over the San Francisco Giants, Pence hit his first career home run as a Phillie on the road, against future Giants teammate Madison Bumgarner.

Pence finished fourth in the NL in batting average (.314; behind Jose Reyes, Ryan Braun, and Matt Kemp) and eighth in RBI, with 97. Pence made the playoffs for the first time in his career; however, the Phillies lost the 2011 National League Division Series to the eventual World Series-champion St. Louis Cardinals in 5 games.

=== San Francisco Giants (2012–2018) ===
==== 2012 ====
On July 31, 2012, the Phillies sent Pence in a deadline deal to the San Francisco Giants. In return, the Phillies received Nate Schierholtz, Tommy Joseph, and Seth Rosin. On August 12, Pence hit his first home run as a Giant off Rockies' relief pitcher Rafael Betancourt. On August 21, despite Pence no longer being on the team, the Phillies went ahead with a previously planned Hunter Pence bobblehead promotion.

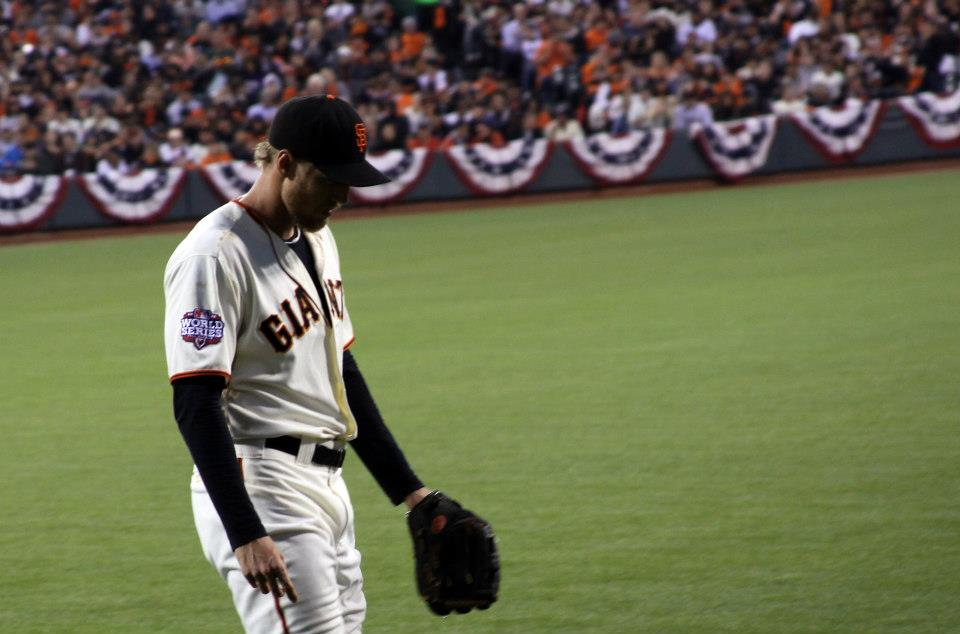
Pence playing right field during the 2012 World Series

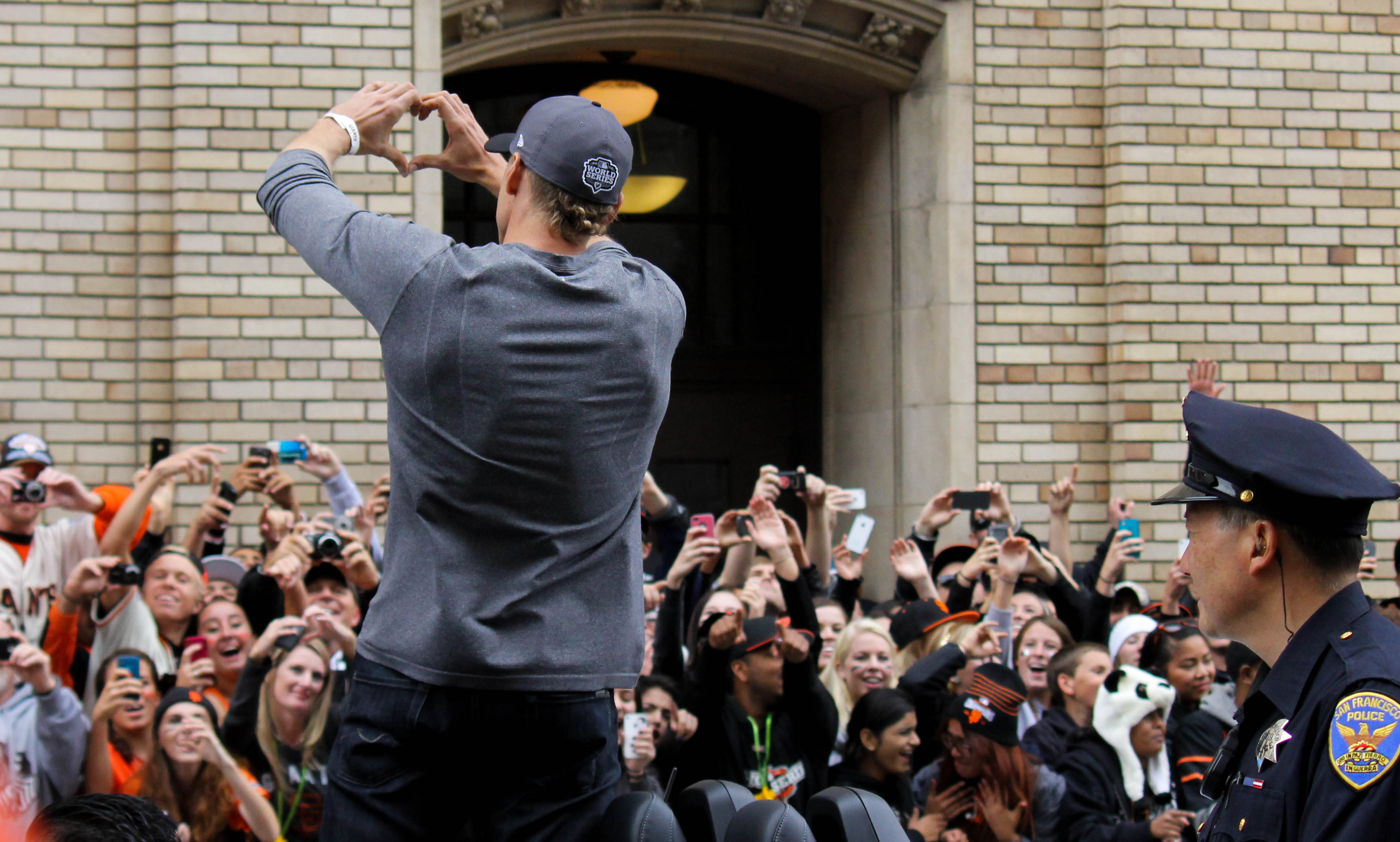
Pence in the 2012 World Series parade

Before Game 3 of the 2012 NLDS, with the Giants down 2–0 and facing elimination against the Cincinnati Reds, Pence gave his teammates a passionate pregame speech in the dugout shortly before the first pitch. The Giants ended up beating the Reds in 3 straight games to advance to the NLCS. His inspirational speeches have been credited by his teammates as helping them rally together during the Giants' postseason and to eventually win the 2012 World Series. His speeches have also become the source of good-natured ribbing between Giants teammates.

==== 2013 ====
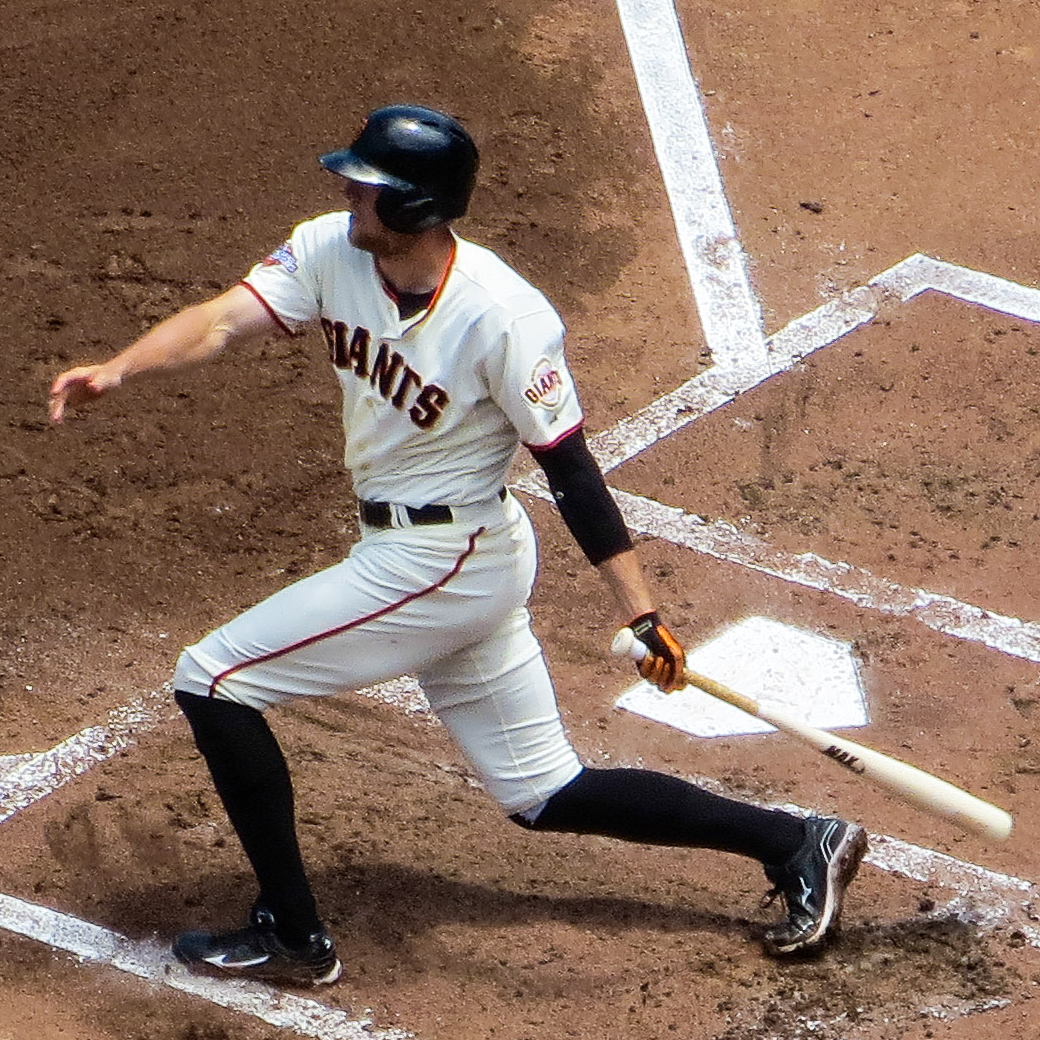
Pence batting at home in 2013

On July 13, 2013, Pence had a five-RBI game in a 9–0 Giants win over the San Diego Padres at Petco Park. With two outs in the bottom of the 8th inning, Pence robbed starting center fielder Alexi Amarista of a hit by making a diving catch to preserve Tim Lincecum's first career no-hitter. On August 27, Pence hit what, at the time, was the longest home run of the season to date. The ball hit a wall above the left field bleacher seats at Coors Field. According to ESPN Tracking, the ball traveled an estimated 476 feet.

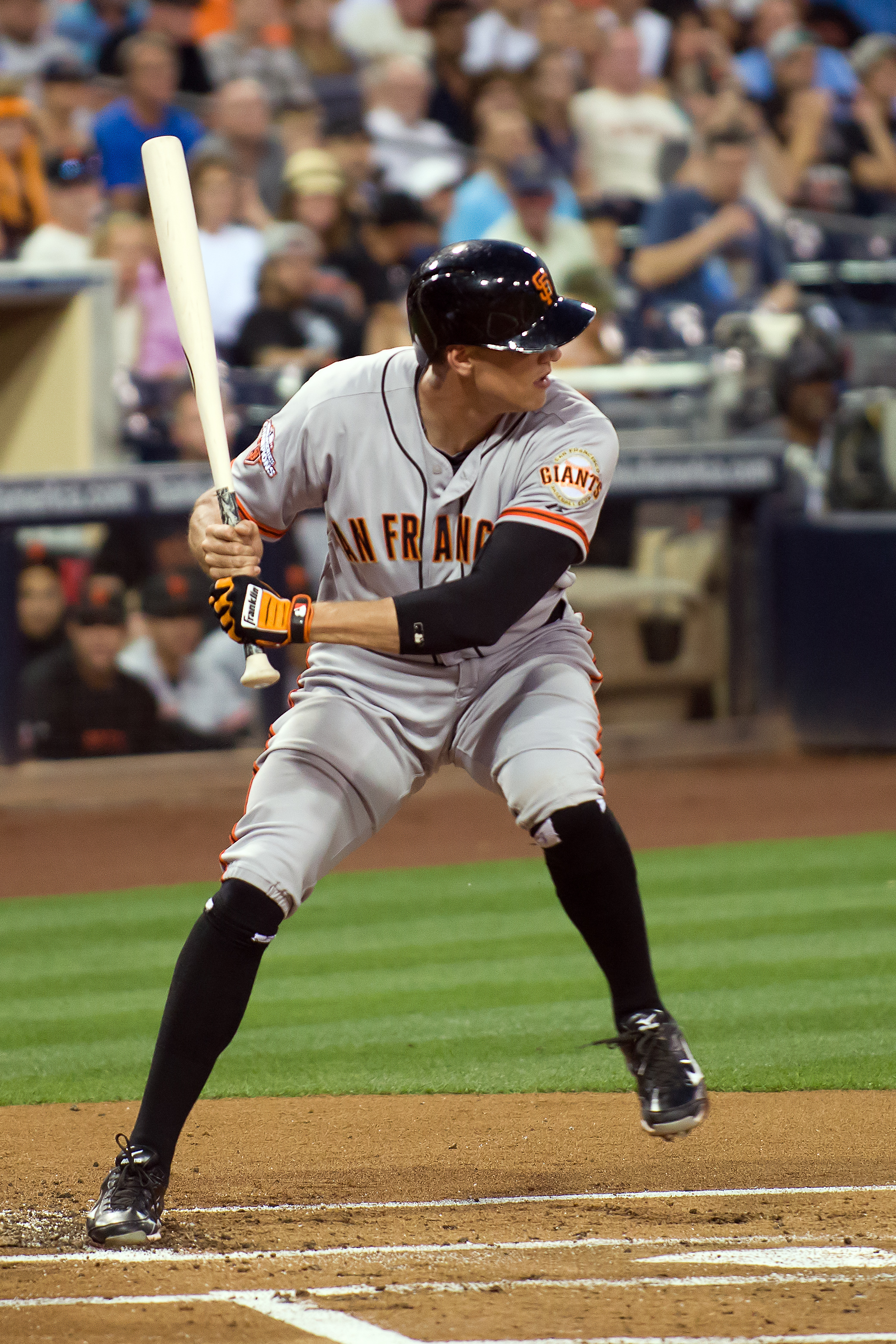
Pence batting on the road in 2013

On September 6 at AT&T Park, in a 3–0 win over the Arizona Diamondbacks, Yusmeiro Petit retired the first 26 batters to start the game. With two outs in the top of the ninth inning, Diamondbacks pinch hitter Eric Chavez singled on a 3-2 count to right field for a base hit. Pence dove for the ball but it fell one foot from him, as it would have been the 27th and final out to complete a perfect game. It would have also been Pence's second no-hit saving catch on the season. Pence was named NL Player of the Month for September, hitting .293 with a .393 on-base percentage and 11 home runs and 32 RBIs. On September 10, Pence hit his 20th home run in the 1st inning and became the 7th San Francisco Giants player to hit 20 home runs and steal 20 bases in the same season and the first since Barry Bonds in 1998. (Bobby Bonds, Willie Mays, Jeffrey Leonard, Orlando Cepeda, and Glenallen Hill are the others.) On September 14, Pence lifted his first career Giants grand slam over the center-field wall at Dodger Stadium in Los Angeles off of Los Angeles Dodgers relief pitcher Stephen Fife and drove in a career-high 7 RBIs, helping propel the Giants to a historic 19–3 rout of their longtime rival the Dodgers. With the help of Brandon Belt's first career five-hit game, they scored the most runs in the history of Dodger Stadium. On September 16, Pence was named National League Player of the Week for the third time in his career, after hitting .448 with 6 home runs and 19 RBIs.

On September 27, Pence won the Willie Mac Award. The next day, Pence agreed to a 5-year, $90 million contract extension with the Giants through the 2018 season.

Pence started all 162 games during the 2013 season, becoming the first Giants player to do so since Alvin Dark in 1954, when the season was 154 games long. For the season, he batted .283/.339/.483 with 91 runs scored (9th in the NL), 27 home runs (4th), 99 RBIs (7th), and 22 stolen bases (9th) in 629 at bats (3rd).

==== 2014 ====
On July 6, Pence was elected to his third All-Star Game. On the second-to-last game of the season, Pence was held out of the starting lineup, ending his streak of consecutive starts at 331. Pence pinch-hit in the seventh inning to continue his games-played streak.

On October 7, in Game 4 of the 2014 NLDS against the favored Washington Nationals, Pence made a leaping catch against the right field wall in the 6th inning to deny Jayson Werth an extra-base hit. This dramatic play held the Giants' 2–1 lead, helping the Giants to secure an eventual 3–2 victory.

In Game 4 of the 2014 World Series, Pence went 3–5 with a double, scored two runs, had three RBIs including one by beating out a double play in the first leading to a run, scored on a fly caught by Jarrod Dyson in shallow center field, and made a nice sliding catch of a bloop hit by Lorenzo Cain in the ninth.

His performance helped lead the Giants to their third World Series title in five years, as San Francisco went on to beat the Royals 3–2 in Game 7. Pence finished the series batting .444 with 5 RBIs and 7 runs scored. He had 12 hits in the series and, along with teammate Brandon Belt, had at least one hit in every game of the 7-game series. Pence's performance drew some media comparisons to Barry Bonds, in terms of unusual statistical production.

==== 2015 ====
"And, of course, we've got Hunter Pence. I told Hunter I was going to talk about him a little bit. He was not only named to the All-Star team, he inspired a craze of signs from opposing fans like 'Hunter Pence eats pizza with a fork,' 'Hunter Pence likes Godfather III.' Not everybody would have laughed at those signs, but not everybody is Hunter Pence."

— President of the United States Barack Obama remarks on Pence

On March 5, 2015, Pence suffered a fractured left forearm after being hit by a pitch during a spring training game against the Chicago Cubs. He started the regular season on the disabled list, ending his league-leading iron man streak of consecutive games played at 383. Pence started a rehab assignment with the Triple-A Sacramento River Cats on May 8 and was activated from the disabled list on May 16. Pence batted .282 with two home runs and 13 RBIs in 18 games before returning to the disabled list on June 11 with left wrist tendinitis.

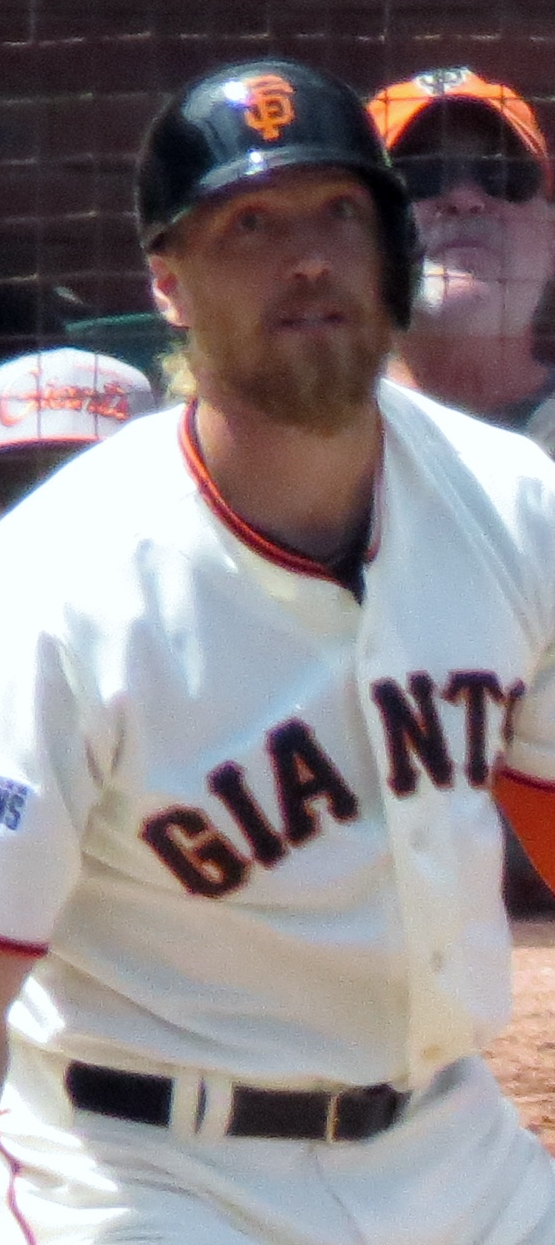
Pence batting during a home game in 2015

Pence was re-activated on July 7 and drove in two runs and started a double play after making a diving catch in a 3–0 victory over the New York Mets. On July 10, Pence hit an opposite-field grand slam off former teammate Cole Hamels, part of a 15–2 rout of the Philadelphia Phillies. Pence returned to the disabled list on August 20 with a left oblique strain and missed the rest of the season.

==== 2016–2018 ====
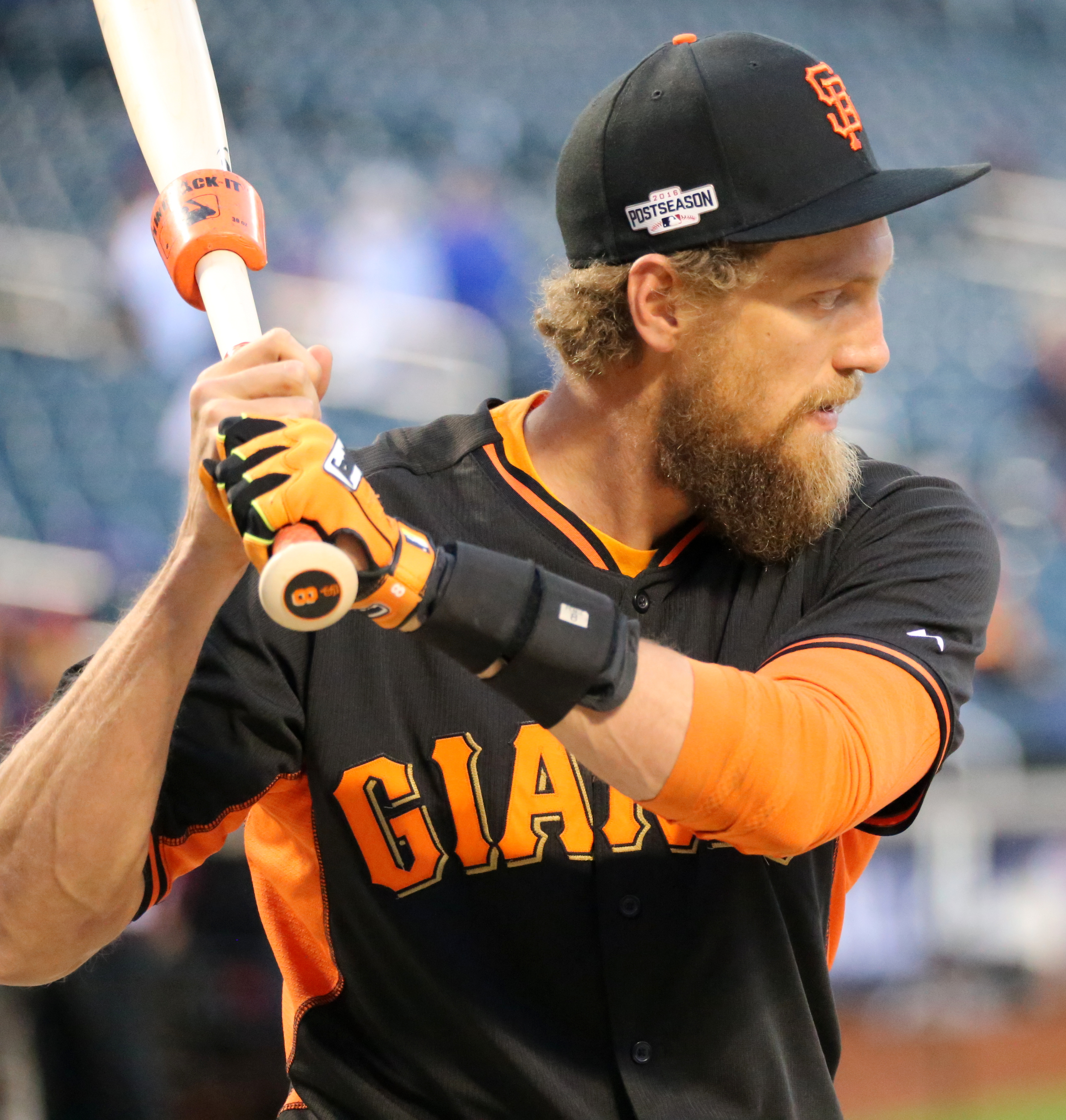
Pence taking batting practice before the 2016 National League Wild Card Game

Pence was named National League Player of the Week for the fourth time in his career after batting .421 (8-for-19) with 2 home runs and 10 RBIs during April 25 – May 1, 2016. On May 14, Pence hit his 200th career home run in a game against the Arizona Diamondbacks. On June 1, Pence suffered a torn hamstring tendon of his right leg while running to first base, and was expected to miss at least eight weeks. On September 9 and 10 at Chase Field, in wins by the scores of 7–6 and 11–3 over the Arizona Diamondbacks, Pence scored four runs in consecutive games, becoming the first Giant since Fred Snodgrass did so on June 4 and 5, 1912 and the 10th player in Major League history in more than 100 years to score at least four runs in consecutive games. In 2016 he batted .289/.357/.451 with 13 home runs in 395 at bats.

On May 15, 2017, Pence was placed on the 10-day disabled list due to a troubling left hamstring. For the season, he had the lowest line drive percentage of all major league hitters (13.4%). In 2017 he batted .260/.315/.385 with 13 home runs in 493 at bats. On April 3, 2018, Pence sprained his thumb while diving to make a play. Pence was placed on the 10-day disabled list due to the injury. In 2018 he batted .226/.258/.332 with 4 home runs in 235 at bats.

On September 30, 2018 at AT&T Park, at the conclusion of Fan Appreciation Day and Weekend, the team reflected on the season and honored Pence. The event was broadcast live on local television on NBC Sports Bay Area, where Giants public address announcer Renel Brooks-Moon served as MC, and included a speech from manager Bruce Bochy, before Pence addressed the crowd.

=== Texas Rangers (2019) ===
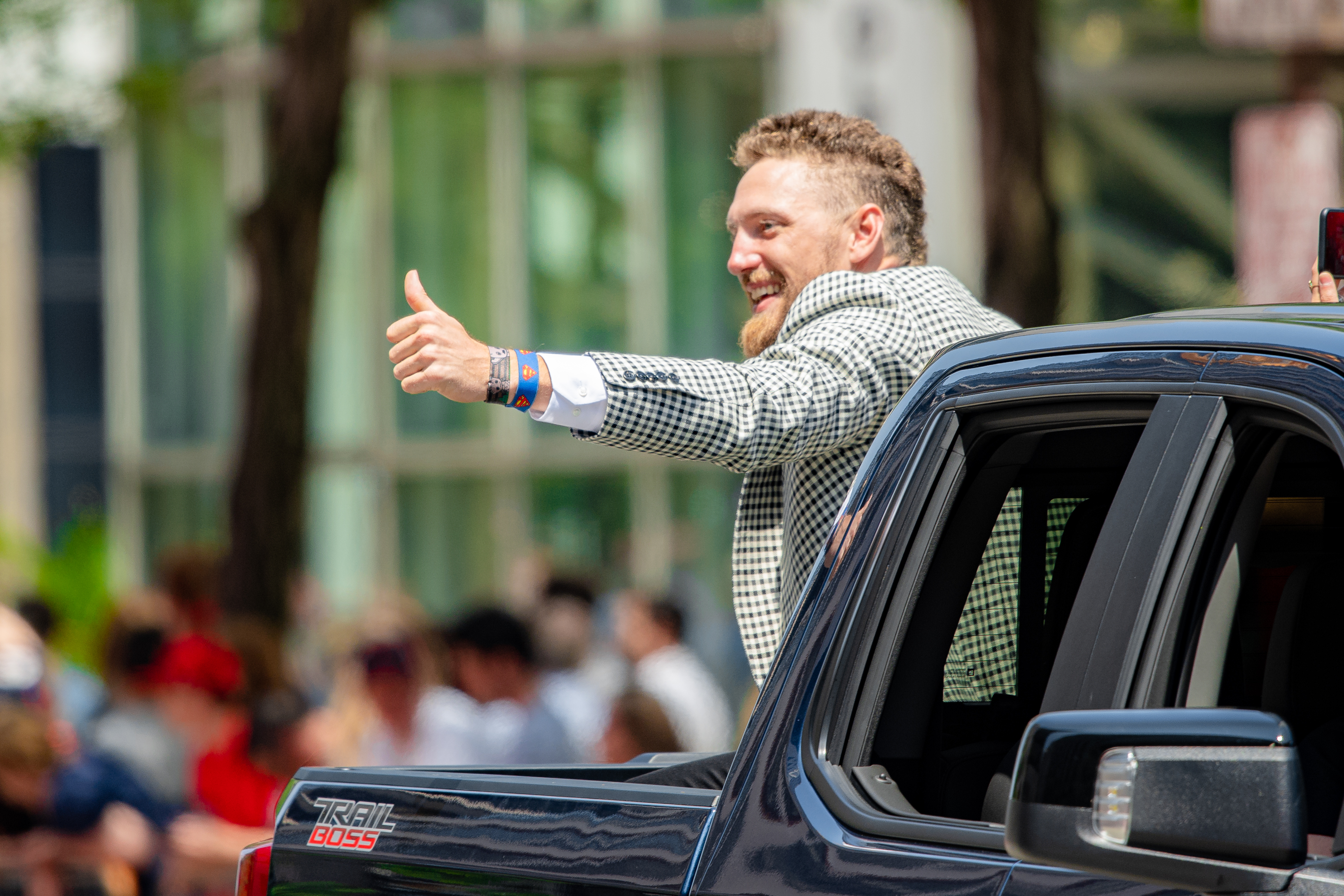
Pence in the 2019 Major League Baseball All-Star Game Red Carpet Parade

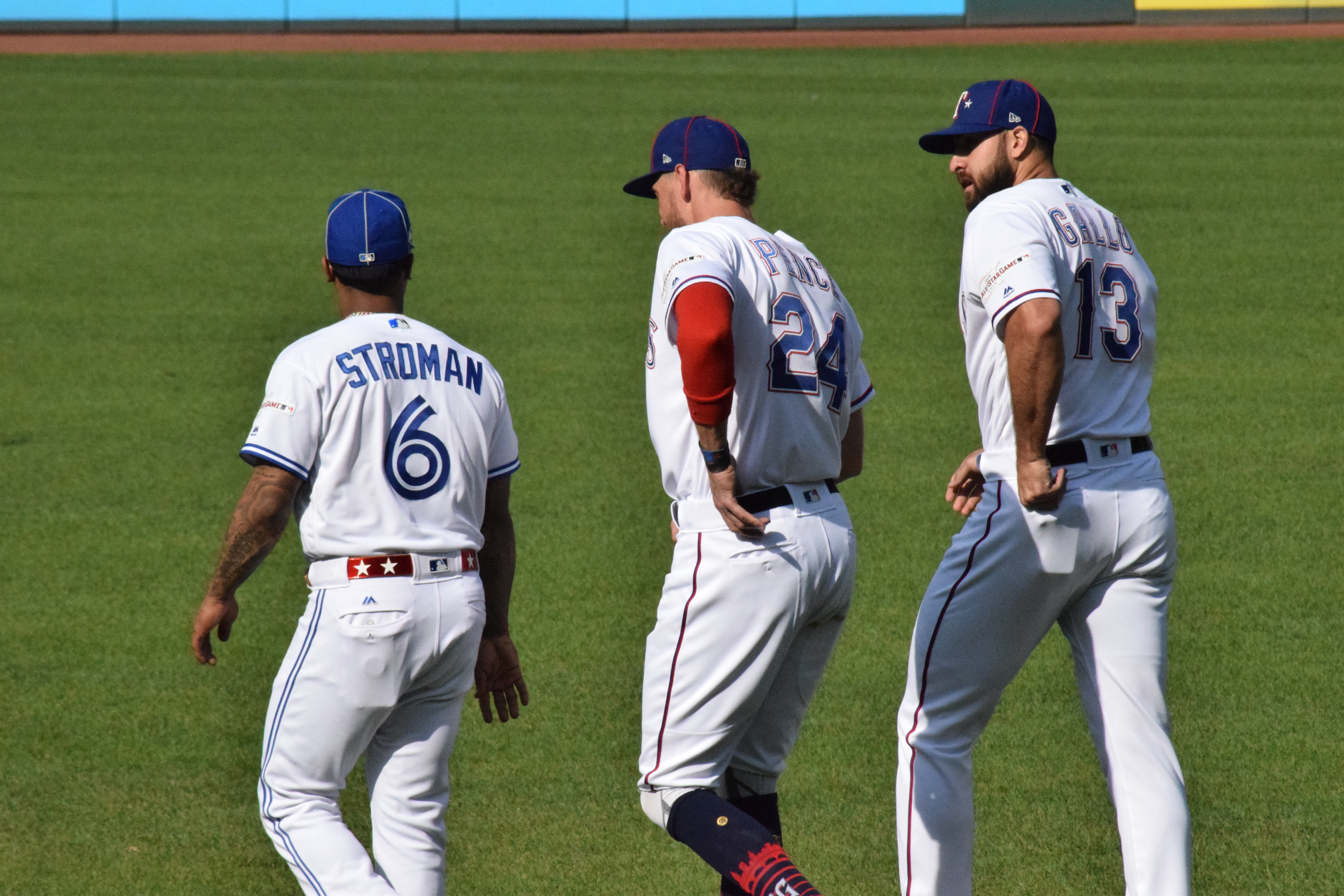
Pence with Marcus Stroman (left) and Joey Gallo (right) before the 2019 Major League Baseball All-Star Game

On February 7, 2019, Pence signed a minor league contract with an invitation to spring training with the Texas Rangers. On March 21, the Rangers announced that Pence made the Opening Day roster. Pence was voted in as the starting designated hitter for the American League in the 2019 Major League Baseball All-Star Game. Pence finished the 2019 season posting a .297/.358/.552/.910 slash line with 18 home runs and 59 RBIs over 286 at bats in 83 games. On October 24, he was awarded the American League's "Comeback Player of the Year".

=== Return to the Giants (2020) ===
On February 7, 2020, Pence re-signed with the Giants on a one-year, $3 million contract. After starting the season by hitting .096/.161/.250 with 2 home runs and 6 RBIs over 56 plate appearances, Pence was designated for assignment by the Giants on August 23, 2020, after the team's acquisition of Daniel Robertson. Pence was released by the team the next day.

On September 26, 2020, Pence officially announced his retirement from professional baseball. On September 27, 2020 at Oracle Park, in the season finale against the San Diego Padres, he celebrated his first day of retirement with his wife and friends on a boat in McCovey Cove.

== Broadcasting career ==
On July 18, 2021, Pence debuted as a Giants color analyst for NBC Sports Bay Area. In March 2022, he joined MLB Network as an analyst.

== Personal life ==
During the 2013 season, Pence kept to a strict Paleolithic diet. There have been conflicting reports since about his retention of this diet. Also in 2013, he was diagnosed with Scheuermann's disease, a spinal disorder that usually develops in adolescence. It was not discovered in Pence until his physical before signing a five-year $90 million contract with the San Francisco Giants in September.

On December 3, 2015, Pence announced his engagement to Alexis Cozombolidis, to whom he proposed at Walt Disney World. They married on November 26, 2016, and live in San Francisco. Pence appeared as himself in an episode of the television sitcom Fuller House in 2016. Pence appeared as a guest on an episode of Bill Nye Saves the World in 2017.

Pence is the San Francisco host for Big League Impact, an eight-city fantasy football network created and led by longtime St. Louis Cardinals pitcher Adam Wainwright. In 2015, the organization raised more than $1 million for various charitable organizations.

Pence is a video game streamer on Twitch and plays MTG. Alongside Ming Chen and others, he is the co-founder and co-owner of Coral Sword, a gaming café in Eastwood, Houston.

== Awards ==
- 2003 – Summer League First-Team All-American DH
- 2003 – Southland Conference All-Star OF
- 2004 – Southland Conference Player of the Year
- 2004 – Southland Conference All-Star OF
- 2004 – Southland Conference Hitter of the Year
- 2005 – Low A All-Star OF
- 2005 – Houston Astros Minor League Player of the Year
- 2005 – South Atlantic League All-Star OF
- 2005 – South Atlantic League Most Outstanding Prospect
- 2006 – All-Star Futures Game selection
- 2006 – Baseball America Minor League All-Star
- 2006 – Arizona Fall League All-Prospect Team
- 2007 – National League Player of the Week (May 14–20, 2007), along with José Valverde of the Arizona Diamondbacks
- 2007 – National League Rookie of the Month- for the month of May
- 2009 – National League All-Star
- 2010 – National League Player of the Week (August 29 – September 5, 2010)
- 2011 – National League All-Star
- 2012 – World Series Champion
- 2013 – National League Player of the Week (September 9–15, 2013)
- 2013 – National League Player of the Month (September)
- 2013 – Willie Mac Award
- 2014 – National League All-Star
- 2014 – World Series Champion
- 2016 – National League Player of the Week (April 25 – May 1, 2016)
- 2019 – American League All-Star
- 2022 – San Francisco Giants Wall of Fame

== See also ==
- Houston Astros award winners and league leaders
- List of Major League Baseball career games played as a right fielder leaders
- List of Major League Baseball career home run leaders
- List of Philadelphia Phillies award winners and league leaders

| Preceded by Josh Hamilton | National League Rookie of the Month; May 2007 | Succeeded by Ryan Braun |
