= Elmer Valo =

American baseball player (1921–1998)

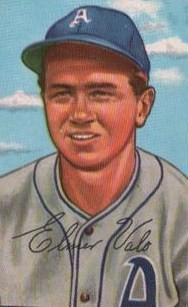
- Outfielder
- Born: Imrich Valo; March 5, 1921; Rybník, Czechoslovakia
- Died: July 19, 1998 (aged 77); Palmerton, Pennsylvania, U.S.
- Batted: Left Threw: Right

MLB debut
- September 22, 1940, for the Philadelphia Athletics

Last MLB appearance
- October 1, 1961, for the Philadelphia Phillies

MLB statistics
- Batting average: .282
- Home runs: 58
- Runs batted in: 601
- Stats at Baseball Reference

Teams
- Philadelphia / Kansas City Athletics (1940–1943, 1946–1956); Philadelphia Phillies (1956); Brooklyn / Los Angeles Dodgers (1957–1958); Cleveland Indians (1959); New York Yankees (1960); Washington Senators / Minnesota Twins (1960–1961); Philadelphia Phillies (1961)

Career highlights and awards
- Philadelphia Baseball Wall of Fame

Elmer William Valo (born Imrich Valo; March 5, 1921 – July 19, 1998), was an American professional baseball player, coach, and scout. He batted left-handed and threw right-handed.

Playing in the major leagues for 20 seasons between 1940 and 1961, Valo batted .282 with 58 home runs and 601 runs batted in (RBI) in 1,806 games, with most of his time spent as a member of the Athletics franchise, which was then located in Philadelphia and Kansas City.

== Early years ==
A native of Rybník, Czechoslovakia, Valo emigrated to the United States with his family at the age of six.

== Career ==
Valo played for the Federalsburg Athletics of the Eastern Shore League in 1939, and for Wilmington in the Interstate League in 1940.

In August 1942, he was featured on the cover of the first issue of Baseball Digest.

His baseball career was interrupted by a term of service in the U.S. Army from 1943–1946. Valo was commissioned as a second lieutenant but did not see combat.

Valo's big-league playing career was affected by three franchise relocations. Valo spent his first 13 seasons in the majors with the Philadelphia A's, then accompanied the team to Kansas City when the club moved after the 1954 season. Valo moved with the Brooklyn Dodgers to Los Angeles after the 1957 season. And after playing for the Washington Senators in 1960, the franchise relocated and Valo found himself playing for the Minnesota Twins.

He was a hustling player and an aggressive line-drive hitter who hit .300 or better five times, with a career-high .364 in 1955. As a right fielder, he was noted for his fearless manner in challenging fences, and occasionally crashed through an outfield wall in pursuit of a ball.

As Valo's career moved into its final phase, he became an outstanding pinch-hitter. He used his strike zone judgment to post an on-base percentage over .400 in eight of the ten seasons (.414 from 1946 to 1955). In 1960, Valo set major-league pinch-hitting season records for games, walks and times on base. He also set a major-league career record with 91 walks as a pinch-hitter.

=== Notable games ===
Valo stated that he had a plate appearance for Philadelphia on September 30, 1939. If true, Valo would join Ted Williams, Mickey Vernon, and Early Wynn as the only four-decade players of the 1930s to the 1960s. The box score for the game does not list Valo — he claimed that he was left out by the official scorer, as he was not under contract with Philadelphia at the time.

On May 1, 1949, Valo became the first major league player to hit two bases-loaded triples in a game. The feat has been matched only by Bill Bruton (1959) and Duane Kuiper (1978). Valo added another bases-loaded triple that year, matching the major league record of three in a season, which was originally set by Shano Collins in 1918.

Valo hit for the cycle on August 2, 1950.

== Later years ==
Following his retirement as a player, Valo worked with the Indians' organization as a major league coach and minor league manager, and served as a scout for the Phillies for 13 years, until his death. He was inducted into the Philadelphia Baseball Wall of Fame in 1990. Valo died in Palmerton, Pennsylvania, at the age of 77 in 1998.

== See also ==
- List of Major League Baseball players to hit for the cycle

Achievements
Preceded by none	Two bases-loaded triples in a game May 1, 1949	Succeeded by Bill Bruton
Preceded by Roy Smalley Jr.	Hitting for the cycle August 2, 1950	Succeeded by Hoot Evers
