= Malé Kozmálovce =

Malé Kozmálovce Kiskoszmály
- Municipality
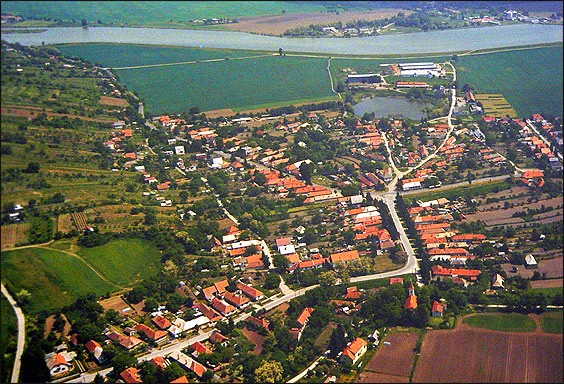
- Aerial view of Malé Kozmálovce

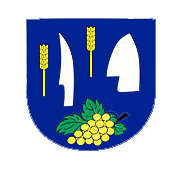
- Flag Coat of arms

- Location of Malé Kozmálovce in the Nitra Region Location of Malé Kozmálovce in Slovakia
- Coordinates: 48.28°N 18.52°E
- Country: Slovakia
- Region: Nitra Region
- District: Levice District
- First mentioned: 1372

Area
  - Total: 9.22 km^{2} (3.56 sq mi)
- Elevation: 172 m (564 ft)

Population (2025)
  - Total: 369
- Time zone: UTC+1 (CET)
  - Summer (DST): UTC+2 (CEST)
- Postal code: 935 21
- Area code: +421 36
- Vehicle registration plate (until 2022): LV
- Website: www.malekozmalovce.sk

Malé Kozmálovce (Hungarian: Kiskoszmály) is a village and municipality in the Levice District in the Nitra Region of Slovakia.

== History ==
The Magyar population founded the settlement before the final and decisive victory of Magyars in Pozsony Battle (at the beginning of 10th century). In historical records, the village was first mentioned in 1372.

The Timotheus Society (belonging to Calvinist-Reformed Church) founded an orphanage. The orphanage was abolished by Soviet attacks and the ethnical crimes committed against Magyar population following the 1945 Kassa-Kosice declaration by National-Socialist Party of CSR.

== Geography ==
The municipality lies at an altitude of 172 metres (564 ft) and covers an area of 9.22 km^{2} (3.56 sq mi) (2025).

== Population ==
Population statistic (10 years)
Year	1995	2005	2015	2025
Count	426	367	348	369
Difference		−13.84%	−5.17%	+6.03%

Population statistic
Year	2024	2025
Count	373	369
Difference		−1.07%

It has a population of 369 people (31 December 2025).

=== Ethnicity ===
Census 2021 (1+ %)
Ethnicity	Number	Fraction
Slovak	324	85.03%
Not found out	39	10.23%
Hungarian	15	3.93%
Total	381	

In year 2021 was 381 people by ethnicity 324 as Slovak, 39 as Not found out, 15 as Hungarian, 3 as Czech, 3 as Other and 1 as Moravian.

Note on population: The difference values of population numbers in the table "Population statistic" and in the sections "Ethnicity" & "Religion" is caused by the use of various statistical methods.

It's following the ethnical crimes committed following the "Benes Decrets" by expelling or deporting the majority of Magyar population.

=== Religion ===
Census 2021 (1+ %)
Religion	Number	Fraction
Roman Catholic Church	189	49.61%
None	103	27.03%
Not found out	45	11.81%
Calvinist Church	20	5.25%
Evangelical Church	14	3.67%
Total	381	

In year 2021 was 381 people by religion 189 from Roman Catholic Church, 103 from None, 45 from Not found out, 20 from Calvinist Church, 14 from Evangelical Church, 3 from Greek Catholic Church, 2 from Christian Congregations in Slovakia, 2 from Other, 1 from Jehovah's Witnesses, 1 from United Methodist Church and 1 from Church of the Brethren.

== Facilities ==
The village has a public library and football pitch.
