= Veľké Kozmálovce =

Municipality of Slovakia

Veľké Kozmálovce Nagykoszmály
- Municipality
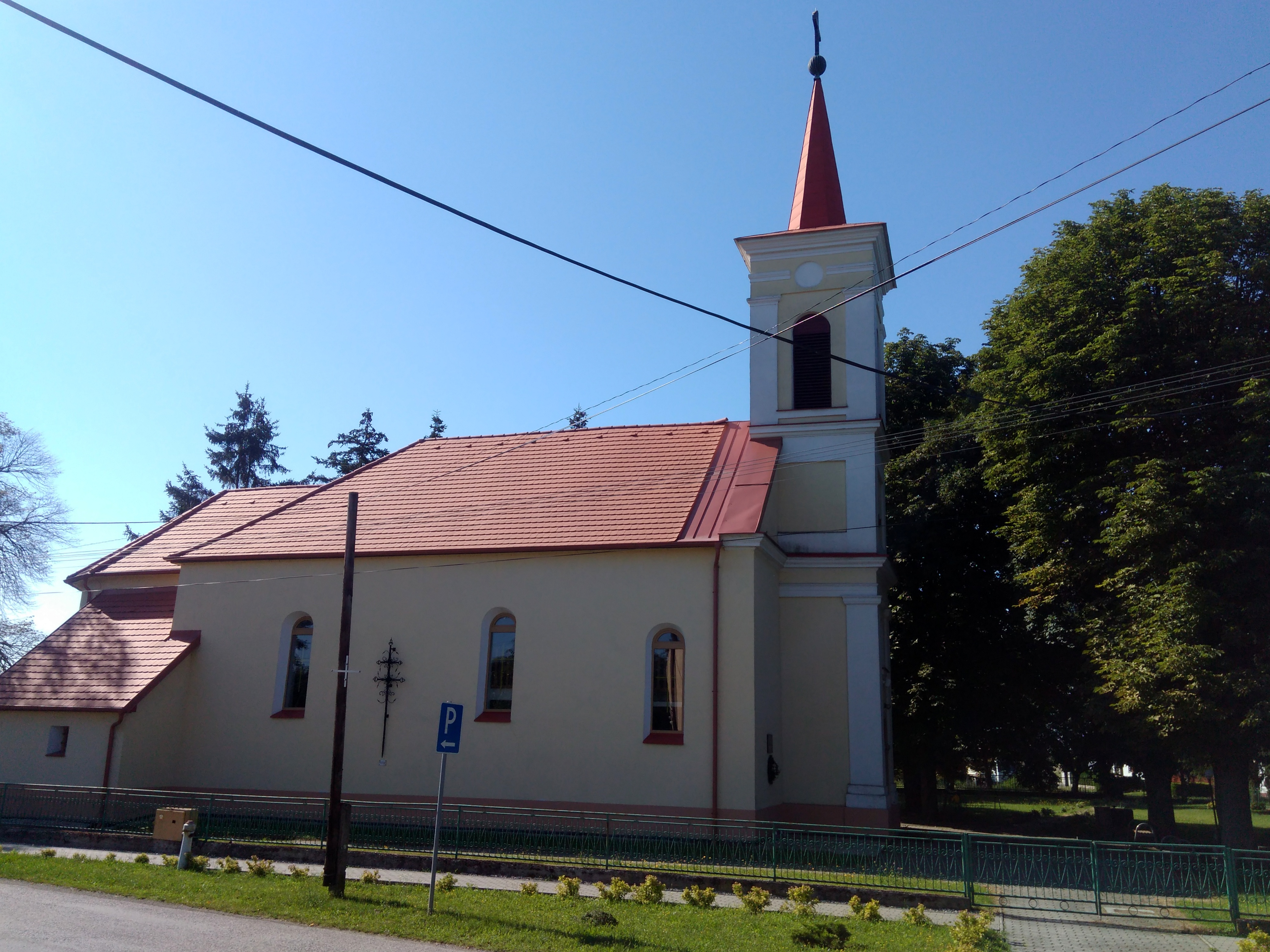
- All Saints Church in Veľké Kozmálovce

- Flag

- Location of Veľké Kozmálovce in the Nitra Region Location of Veľké Kozmálovce in Slovakia
- Coordinates: 48.28°N 18.53°E
- Country: Slovakia
- Region: Nitra Region
- District: Levice District
- First mentioned: 1322

Area
  - Total: 5.92 km^{2} (2.29 sq mi)
- Elevation: 172 m (564 ft)

Population (2025)
  - Total: 737
- Time zone: UTC+1 (CET)
  - Summer (DST): UTC+2 (CEST)
- Postal code: 935 21
- Area code: +421 36
- Vehicle registration plate (until 2022): LV
- Website: www.velkekozmalovce.sk

Veľké Kozmálovce (Hungarian: Nagykoszmály) is a village and municipality in the Levice District in the Nitra Region of Slovakia.

== History ==
Veľké Kozmálovce was first mentioned in writing in 1322 as Kozmal. In 1362 the village was owned by the Forgách family, later it was in Lewenz and Goldmorawitz and was last owned by the Migazzi family. The municipal area also includes two lost medieval settlements, Braian and Scevlen. In 1618 the place was plundered by the Turks. In 1534 there were four porta, in 1601 there were 45 houses in the village, according to a Turkish tax register from 1664 there were 43 taxpayers and 33 households here. In 1720 there were 23 taxpayers, in 1828 there were 69 houses and 445 inhabitants employed as farmers.

Until 1918, the village in Bars county belonged to the Kingdom of Hungary and then came to Czechoslovakia and today Slovakia.

From 1986 to 1995 Veľké Kozmálovce was part of the town of Tlmače.

== Geography ==
The municipality lies at an altitude of 172 metres (564 ft) and covers an area of 5.92 km^{2} (2.29 sq mi) (2025).

== Population ==
Population statistic (10 years)
Year	1995	2005	2015	2025
Count	692	682	696	737
Difference		−1.44%	+2.05%	+5.89%

Population statistic
Year	2024	2025
Count	741	737
Difference		−0.53%

It has a population of 737 people (31 December 2025).

=== Ethnicity ===
Census 2021 (1+ %)
Ethnicity	Number	Fraction
Slovak	706	98.32%
Total	718	

In year 2021 was 718 people by ethnicity 706 as Slovak, 5 as Not found out, 4 as Hungarian, 2 as Czech, 1 as Vietnamese, 1 as Romani and 1 as Croatian.

Note on population: The difference values of population numbers in the table "Population statistic" and in the sections "Ethnicity" & "Religion" is caused by the use of various statistical methods.

=== Religion ===
Census 2021 (1+ %)
Religion	Number	Fraction
Roman Catholic Church	571	79.53%
None	119	16.57%
Greek Catholic Church	8	1.11%
Evangelical Church	8	1.11%
Total	718	

In year 2021 was 718 people by religion 571 from Roman Catholic Church, 119 from None, 8 from Greek Catholic Church, 8 from Evangelical Church, 5 from Not found out, 3 from Ad hoc movements, 2 from Christian Congregations in Slovakia, 1 from Jewish community and 1 from Calvinist Church.

According to the 2011 census, Veľké Kozmálovce had a population of 705, of which 702 were Slovaks and one Hungarian and one Czech. One resident did not specify the ethnicity.

651 residents are affiliated with the Roman Catholic Church, 15 residents with the Evangelical Church, one with the Orthodox Church and three with another denomination. 25 residents were non-denominational and with 10 residents the denomination was not determined.

== Facilities ==
The village has a public library and football pitch. Along with the Roman Catholic, All Saints Church from the 18th century.
