= Bars County =

County of the Kingdom of Hungary

Bars County Comitatus Barsiensis (Latin) Bars vármegye (Hungarian) Komitat Bars (German) Tekovská župa (Slovak)
- County of the Kingdom of Hungary
- 11th century–1920
- Coat of arms

- Capital: Bars; Léva (1321–1580); Kis-Tapolcsan (1580–1735); Aranyosmarót (1735–1920)
- Area
  - Coordinates: 48°23′N 18°24′E
  - 1910: 2,724 km^{2} (1,052 sq mi)
- Population
  - 1910: 178,500
- History
  - Established: 11th century
  - Treaty of Trianon: 4 June 1920
- Today part of: Slovakia
- Starý Tekov; Levice; Topoľčianky; Zlaté Moravce are the current name of the capital.

Bars (Latin: comitatus Barsiensis, Hungarian: Bars, Slovak: Tekov, German: Barsch) was an administrative county (comitatus) of the Kingdom of Hungary. Its territory is now in central and southern Slovakia. Today in Slovakia, Tekov is the informal designation of the corresponding territory.

== Geography ==
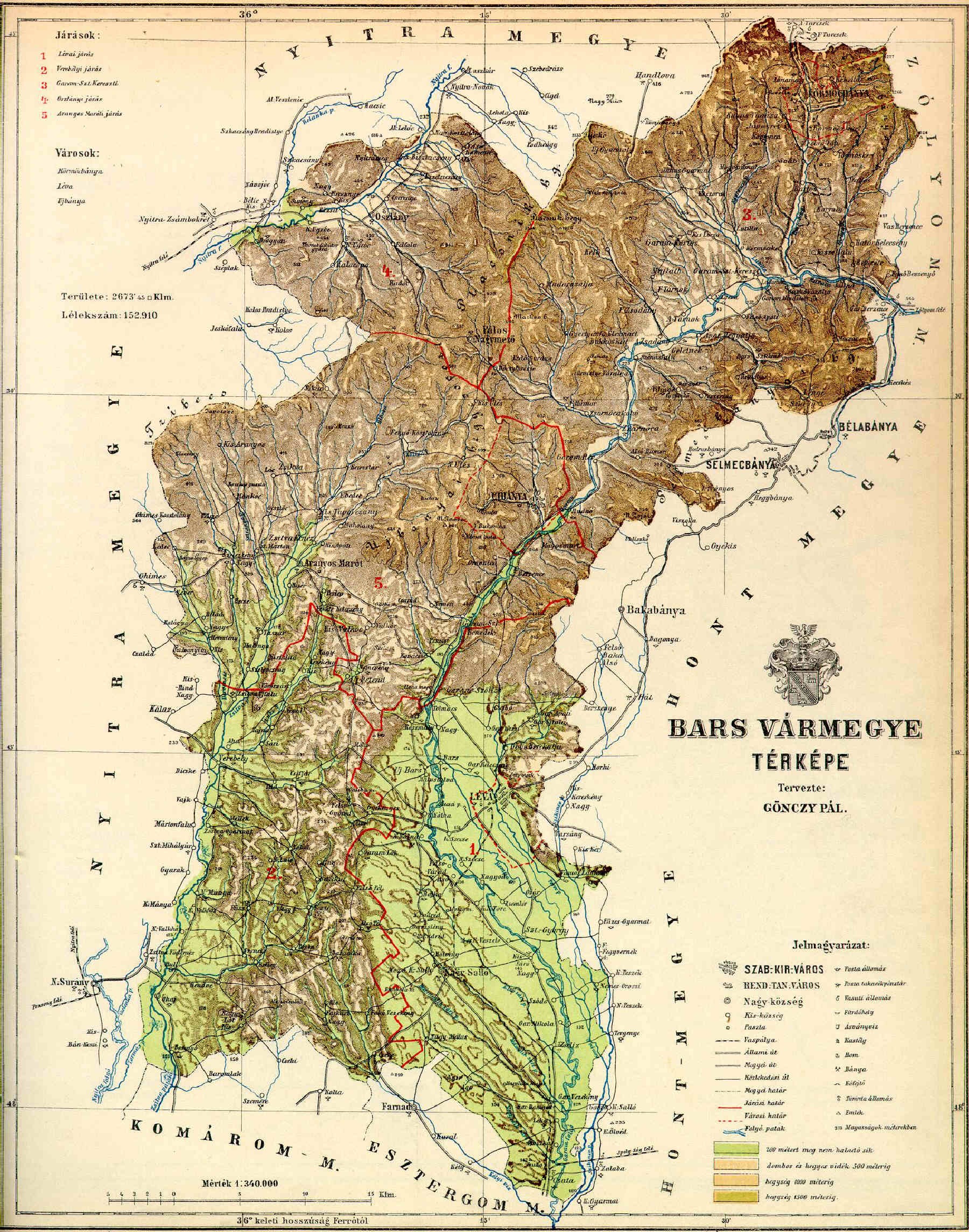
Map of Bars, 1891.

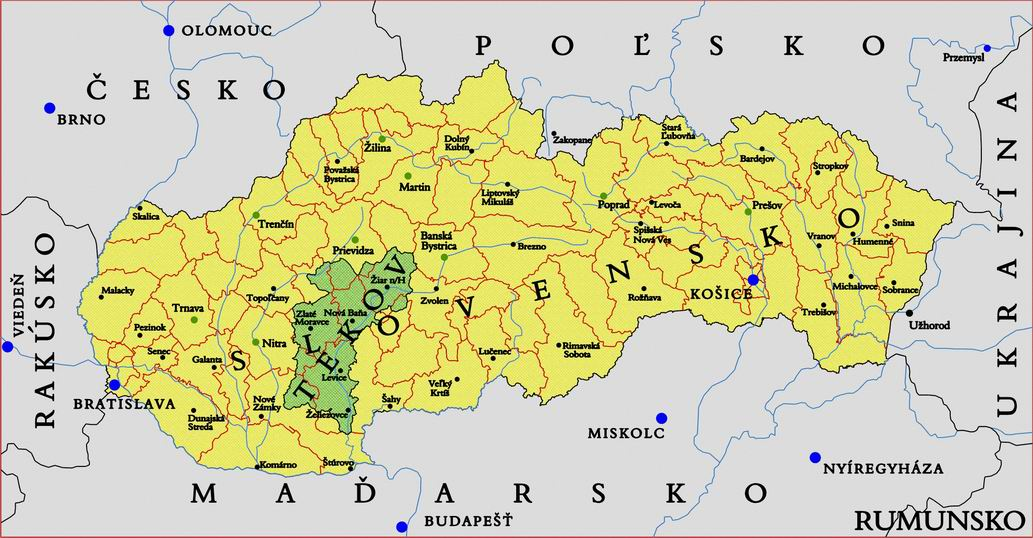
Former county of Bars superimposed on map of contemporary Slovakia

Bars County shared borders with the Hungarian counties of Nyitra, Turóc, Zólyom, Hont, Esztergom and Komárom. It was situated along the Garam river between Hont in the east, Körmöcbánya and Felsőbesenyő in the north (which were part of the county), the Zsitva river in the west, and Zsitvabesenyő and Bény in the south (which was not part of the county). The rivers Garam and Zsitva ran through the county. The county was characterised by mining. Around 1910, its area was 2,724 km^{2} (1,052 sq mi).

== Capitals ==
The capital of the county was the Bars Castle, then the Léva Castle, then from the late 16th century Kistapolcsány and since the 18th century Aranyosmarót.

== History ==
The county arose in the 11th century. The southern part of this county was occupied by Ottoman Empire between 1663 and 1685 and managed as Uyvar Eyalet by her. In the aftermath of World War I, the area became part of newly formed Czechoslovakia, as recognized by the concerned states in 1920 by the Treaty of Trianon.

Following the provisions of the First Vienna Award, the southern part of the area was returned to Hungary in November 1938. This was merged with the southern part of the former Hont county to form Bars-Hont county, with the capital Léva.

After World War II, the Trianon borders were restored and the area lay again completely in Czechoslovakia. In 1993, Czechoslovakia was split and Tekov became part of Slovakia.

== Demographics ==
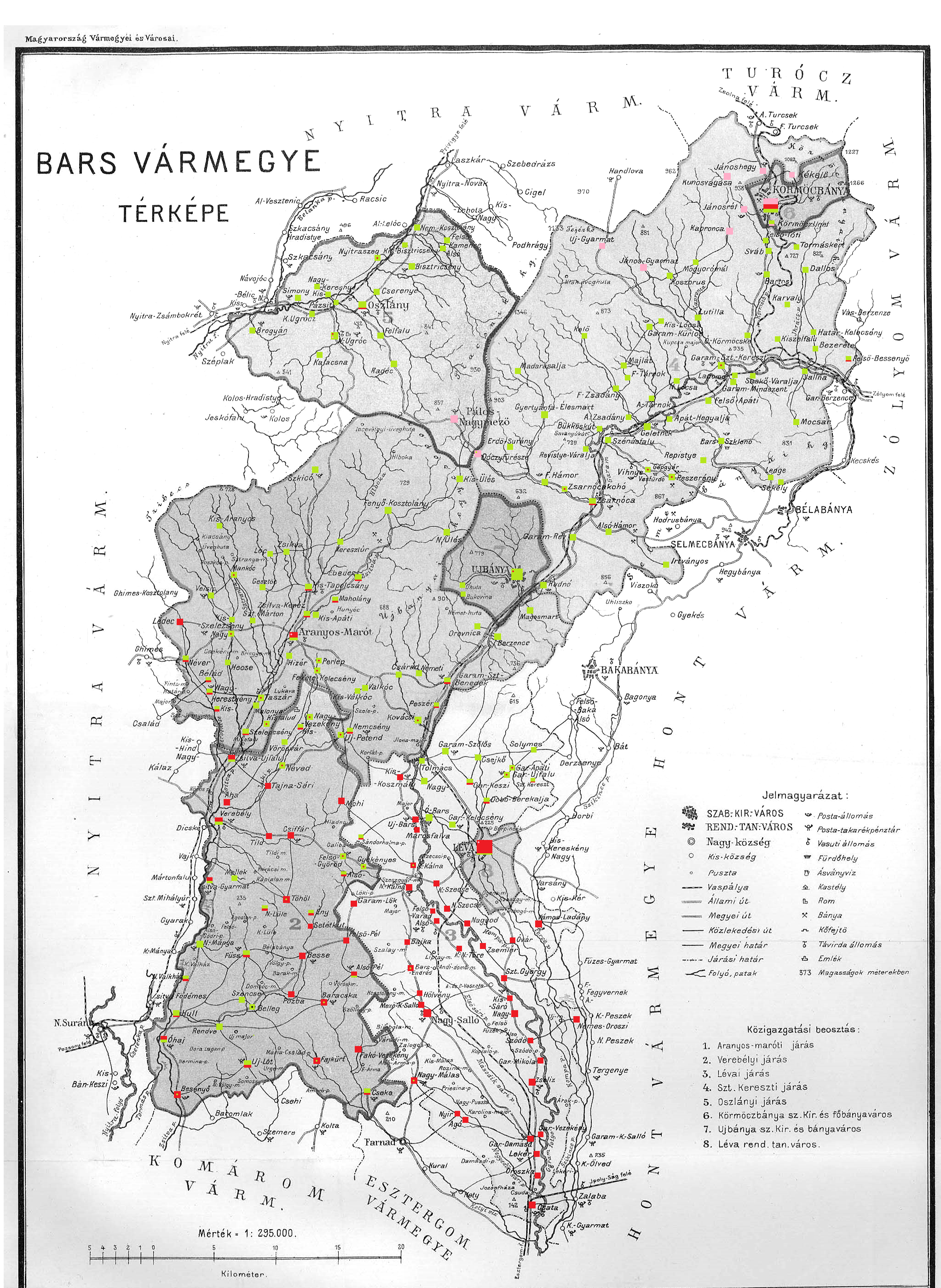
Ethnic map of the county with data of the 1910 census (see the key in the description)

Population by mother tongue (Note: Only linguistic communities > 1% are displayed.)
Census	Total	Slovak	Hungarian	German	Other or unknown
1880	142,691	79,108 (57,05%)	42,118 (30.37%)	16,863 (12.16%)	576 (0.42%)
1890	152,910	87,016 (56.91%)	47,611 (31.14%)	17,561 (11.48%)	722 (0.47%)
1900	165,122	94,879 (57.46%)	52,317 (31.68%)	17,325 (10.49%)	601 (0.36%)
1910	178,500	97,824 (54.80%)	62,022 (34.75%)	17,366 (9.73%)	1,288 (0.72%)

Population by religion (Note: Only religious communities > 1% are displayed.)
Census	Total	Roman Catholic	Calvinist	Jewish	Lutheran	Other or unknown
1880	142,691	118,284 (82.90%)	16,491 (11.56%)	4,927 (3.45%)	2,738 (1.92%)	251 (0.18%)
1890	152,910	127,761 (83.55%)	16,920 (11.07%)	5,157 (3.37%)	3,030 (1.98%)	42 (0.03%)
1900	165,122	139,729 (84.62%)	17,018 (10.31%)	5,191 (3.14%)	3,115 (1.89%)	69 (0.04%)
1910	178,500	153,286 (85.87%)	16,795 (9.41%)	4,969 (2.78%)	3,253 (1.82%)	197 (0.11%)

== Subdivisions ==
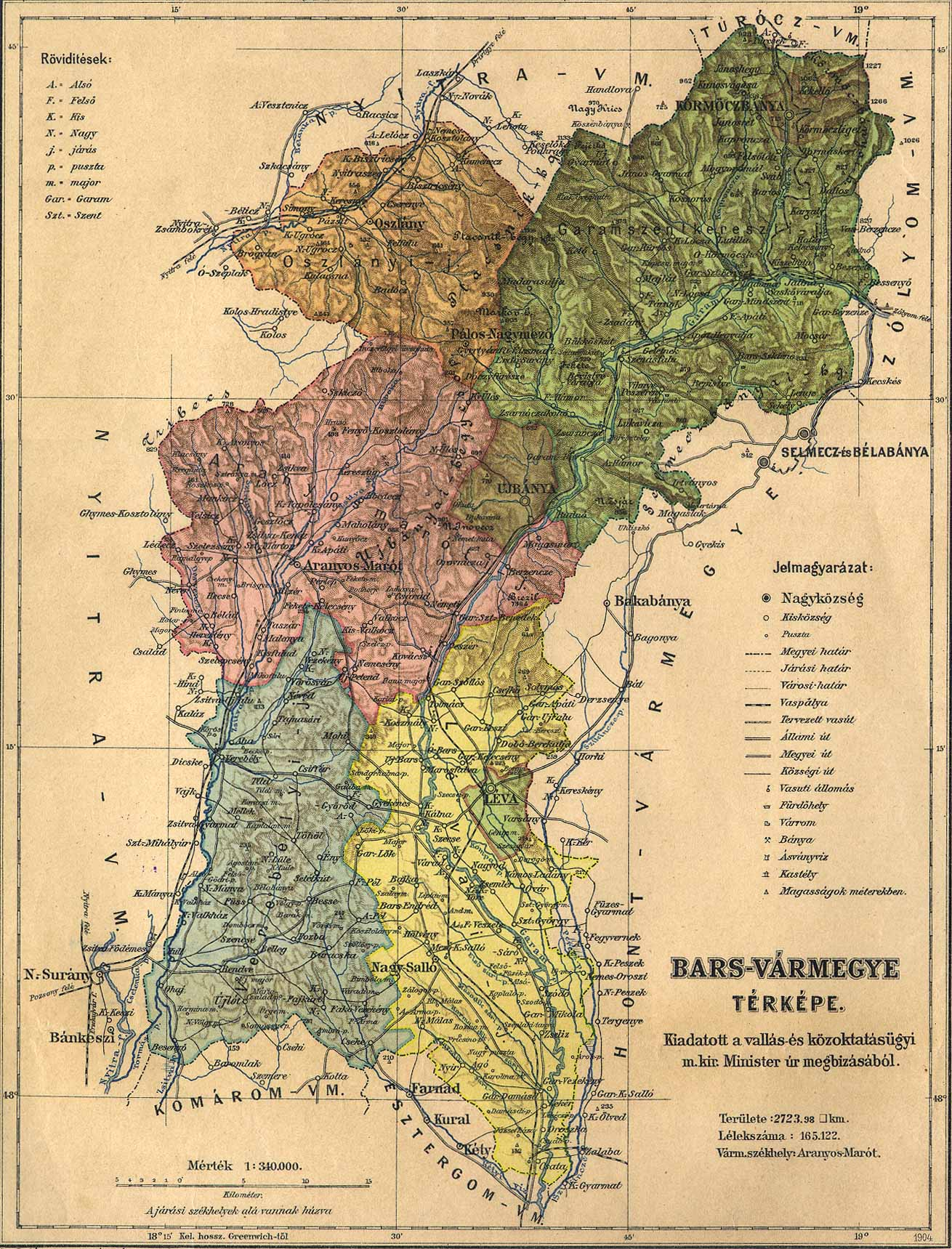

In the early 20th century, the subdivisions of Bars county were:

Districts (járás)
District	Capital
Aranyosmarót	Aranyosmarót (now Zlaté Moravce)
Garamszentkereszt	Garamszentkereszt (now Žiar nad Hronom)
Léva	Léva (now Levice)
Oszlány	Oszlány (now Oslany)
Verebély	Verebély (now Vráble)
Urban districts (rendezett tanácsú város)
Körmöcbánya (now Kremnica)
Léva (now Levice)
Újbánya (now Nová Baňa)
