= Žitava =

Žitava may refer to:

- Žitava (river), a river in Slovakia
- a part of the municipality Radvaň nad Dunajom
- Zittau, Žitava being the Slavic name of the town in Germany

== See also ==
- Peace of Žitava, 1606 treaty that ended the Long War between Royal Hungary and the Ottoman Empire
