= Karvas =

Karvaš (feminine: Karvašová) is a Slovak surname.

== People ==
- Igor Karvaš (born 1967), Slovak sailor
- Imrich Karvaš (1903–1981), Slovak economist
- Ľubica Karvašová (born 1987), Slovak politician
- Milan Karvaš (1932–2024), Slovak chemist
- Peter Karvaš (1920–1999), Slovak writer
