= Tekov =

Region in Slovakia

Coordinates: 48°29′N 18°51′E

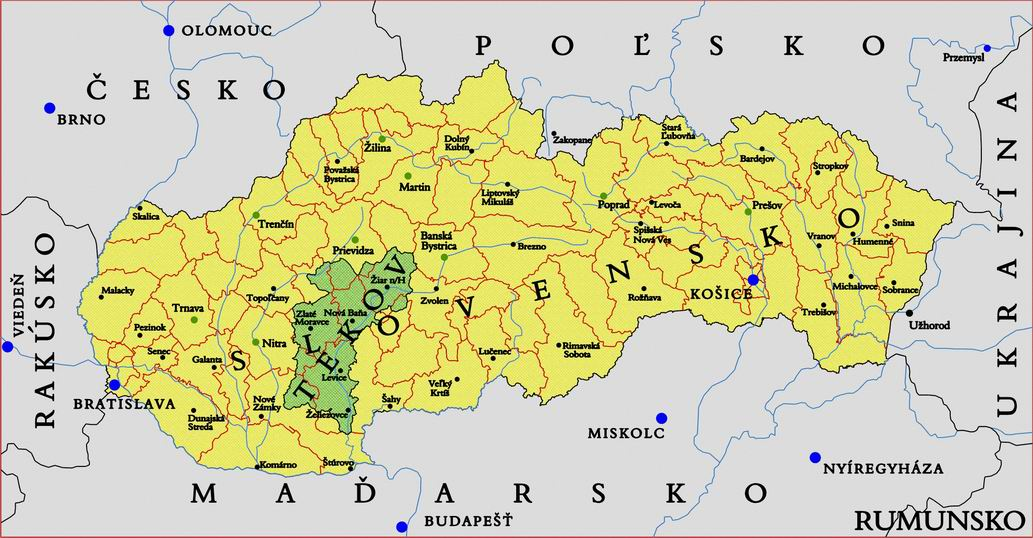
Tekov in Slovakia

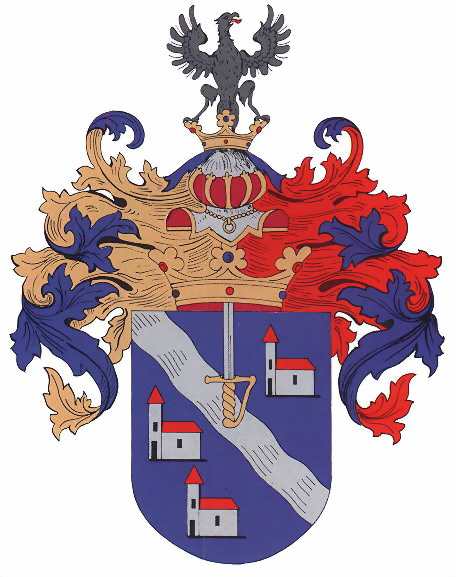
Coat of arms

Tekov (Hungarian: Bars) is the traditional name of a region situated in southern and central Slovakia. Its territory encompasses the former Bars county, existing in the Kingdom of Hungary from the 11th century until 1918, though it is now administratively divided between the Nitra and Banská Bystrica regions (districts Žiar nad Hronom, Žarnovica, Zlaté Moravce, and partly Levice).

Tekov is situated along the Hron river, between the Hont region in the east, (including) Kremnica and Hronská Dúbrava in the north, the Žitava river in the west, Bešeňov and (excluding) Bíňa in the south. The rivers Hron and Žitava flow through the region.

The original seat of the count was the Tekov Castle (since 1321), then Levice Castle. The capital moved in the late 1580 to Topoľčianky and in the late 18th century to Zlaté Moravce.

== See also ==
- Bars county
- List of traditional regions of Slovakia
