= Levice =

Levice Léva
- Town
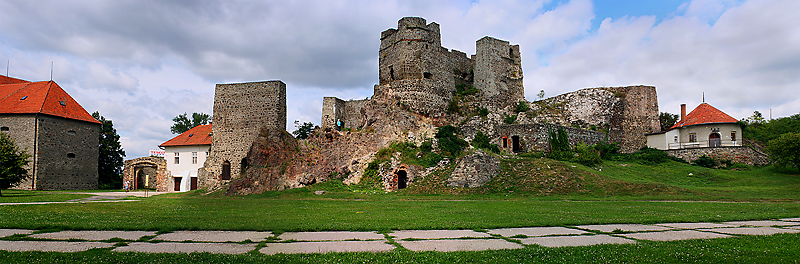
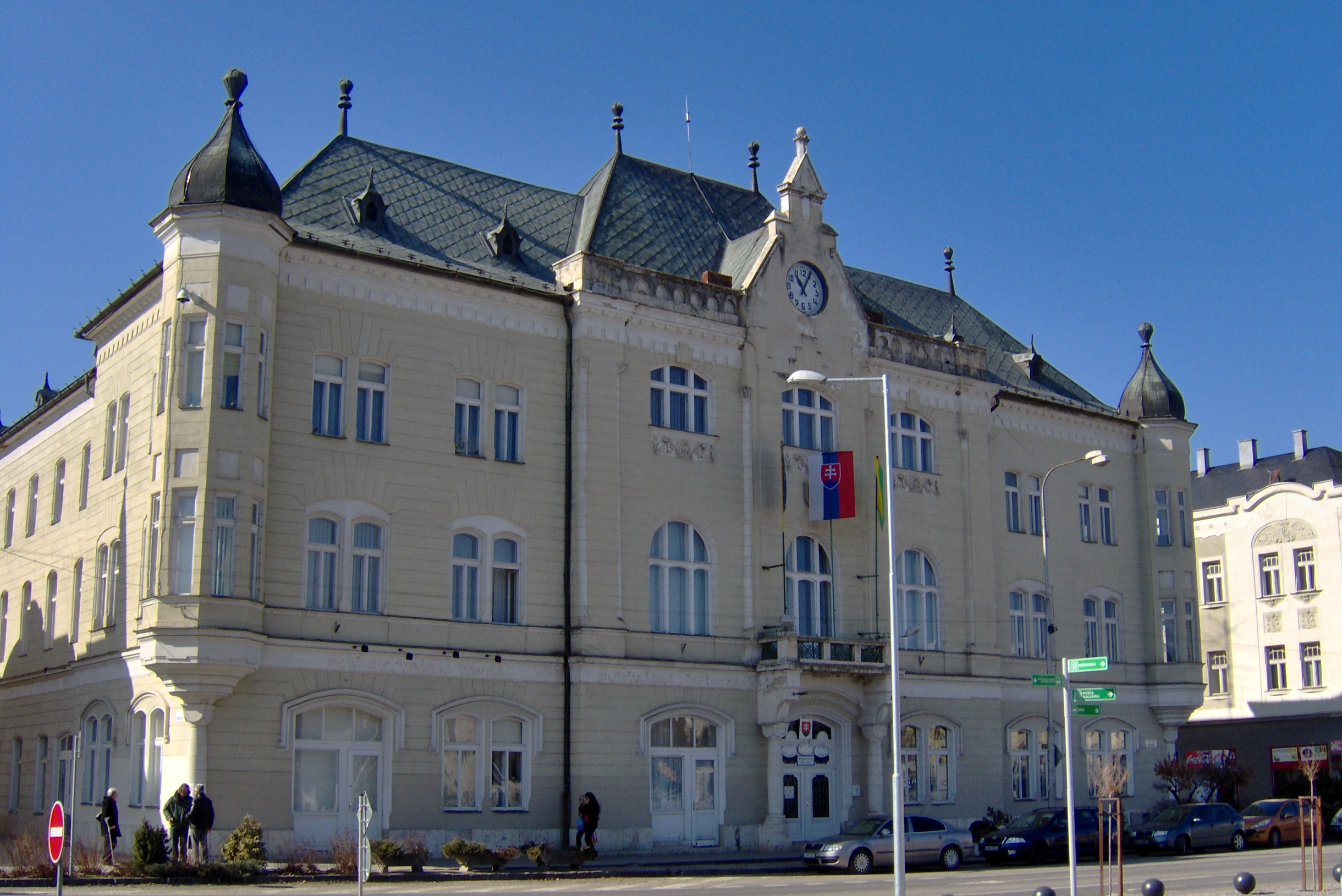
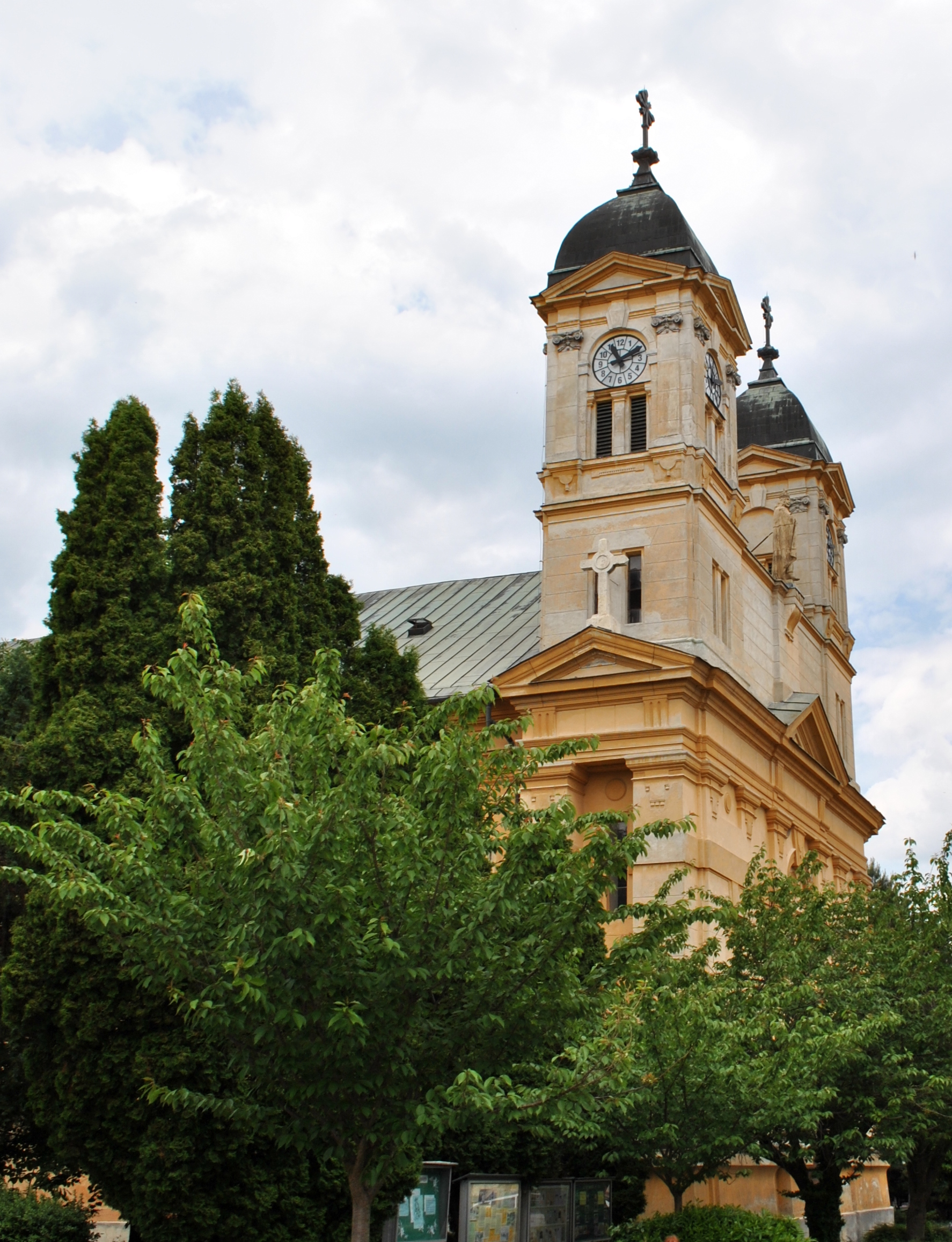
- From the top, Levice Castle, Levice Town Hall, Saint Michael church in Levice

- Flag Coat of arms

- Location in Nitra Region Location in Slovakia
- Coordinates: 48°12′59″N 18°36′29″E
- Country: Slovakia
- Region: Nitra Region
- District: Levice District
- First mentioned: 1156

Government
  - Mayor: RNDr. Ján Krtík

Area
  - Total: 60.99 km^{2} (23.55 sq mi)
- (2022)
- Elevation: 165 m (541 ft)

Population (2025)
  - Total: 30,161
- Time zone: UTC+1 (CET)
  - Summer (DST): UTC+2 (CEST)
- Postal code: 934 01
- Area code: +421 36
- Vehicle registration plate (until 2022): LV
- Website: levice.sk

Levice (Slovak pronunciation: [ˈleʋitse]; Hungarian: Léva, Hungarian pronunciation: [ˈleːvɒ]; German: Lewenz) is a town in western Slovakia. The town lies on the left bank of the lower Hron river. The Old Slavic name of the town was Leva, which means "the Left One".

The town is located in the north-eastern corner of the Danubian Lowland, 110 kilometres (68 miles) east of Bratislava, 40 kilometres (25 miles) south-east of Nitra, 32 kilometres (20 miles) south-west of Banská Štiavnica, 55 kilometres (34 miles) south-west of Zvolen and 25 kilometres (16 miles) from the border with Hungary.

It is the seat of the Levice District, which is the largest district in Slovakia at 1,551 square kilometres (599 square miles). The town's heraldic animal is lion (Slovak: lev), and the town's colours are green and yellow.

== Geography ==
The municipality lies at an altitude of 165 metres (541 ft) and covers an area of 60.99 km^{2} (23.55 sq mi) (2025).

== History ==
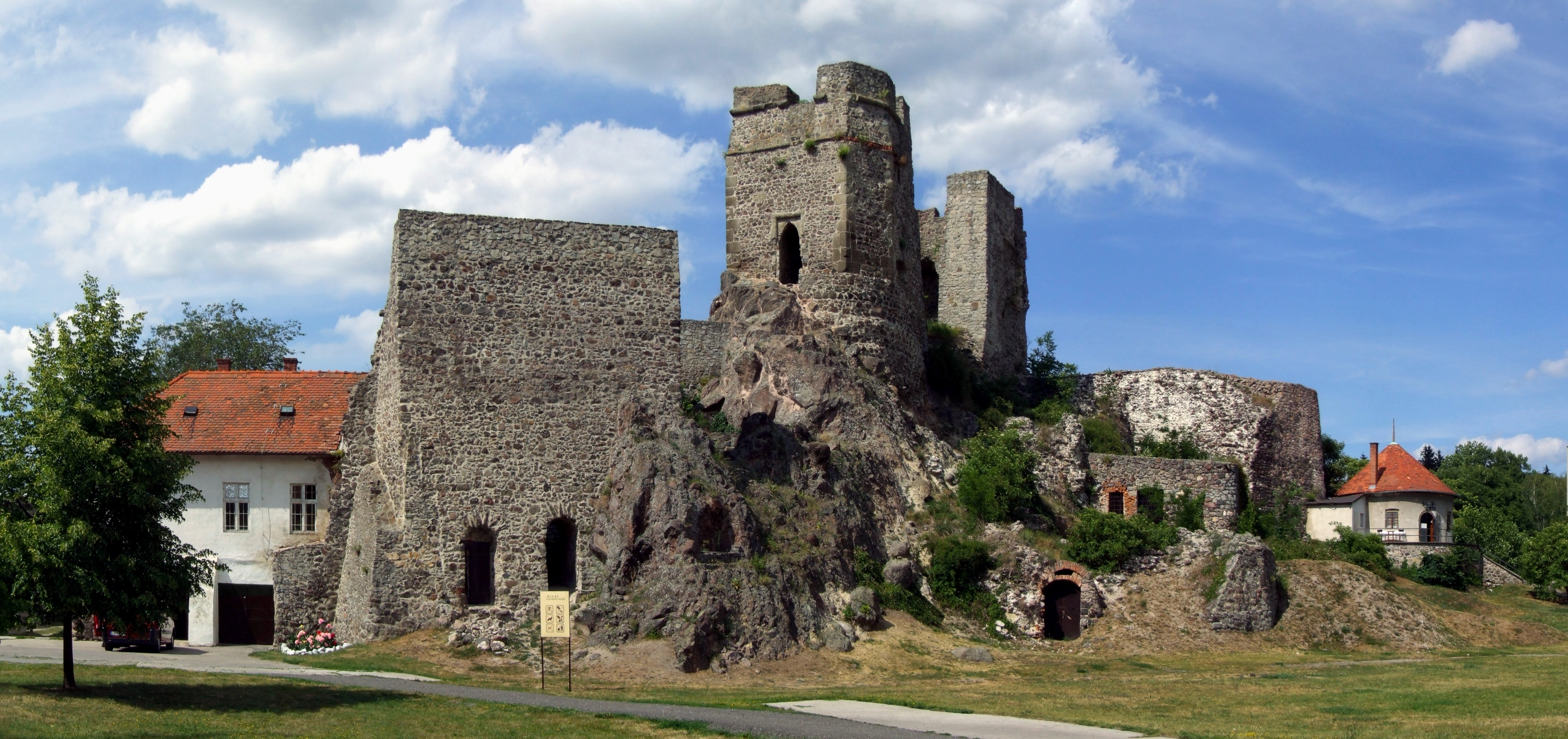
Levice Castle

Levice is first mentioned as Leua, one of the villages belonging to the parish of St. Martin's Church in Bratka (Hungarian: Baratka) in 1156. It was part of the comitatus Tekov (Bars).

First attacked by the Turks in 1544, the town was set on fire while the Levice Castle was left unharmed. Between 1581 and 1589, the settlement was the seat of the Captaincy of Lower Hungary. The town was captured by the Turks in 1663 but recaptured only a year later by the Imperial Army led by General de Souches in the Battle of Levice, which took place beneath the town's castle.

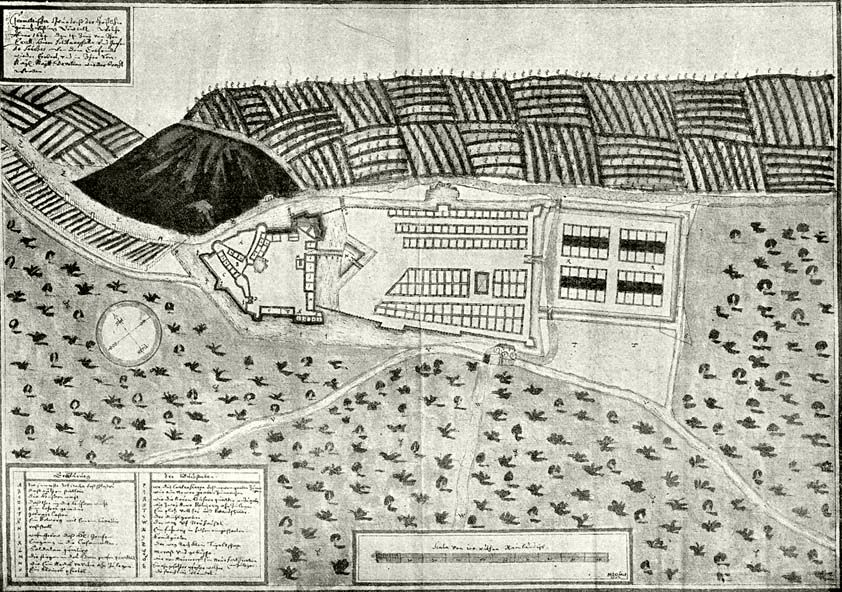
Austrian map, 1672

During the anti-Habsburg revolution of 1709, the fort was blown up by kuruces. After the break-up of Austria-Hungary, the town became part of Czechoslovakia according to demarcation lines drawn by Entente forces in late 1918, with Czechoslovak troops reaching the city in January 1919 and Hungary giving up claim over it in 1920 by signing the Trianon treaty. As part of the breakup of Czechoslovakia under the Munich Agreement in World War II, the town again belonged to Hungary from 1938 to 1945. At the end of the Second World War it was returned to the restored Czechoslovakia. In 1993 it became part of present-day Slovakia.

It was the hometown of Hungarian-American Eugene Fodor (1905–1991), the founder of Fodor's travel book company.

== Population ==
Historical population
Year	Pop.	±%
1970	18,534	—
1980	26,710	+44.1%
1991	33,991	+27.3%
2001	36,538	+7.5%
2011	34,844	−4.6%
2021	31,974	−8.2%
Source: Censuses

Population statistic (10 years)
Year	1995	2005	2015	2025
Count	36,502	36,190	33,773	30,161
Difference		−0.85%	−6.67%	−10.69%

Population statistic
Year	2024	2025
Count	30,556	30,161
Difference		−1.29%

It has a population of 30,161 people (31 December 2025).

=== Ethnicity ===
Census 2021 (1+ %)
Ethnicity	Number	Fraction
Slovak	26,971	84.35%
Hungarian	3037	9.49%
Not found out	2210	6.91%
Total	31,974	

In year 2021 was 31,974 people by ethnicity 26,971 as Slovak, 3037 as Hungarian, 2210 as Not found out, 286 as Czech, 190 as Romani, 120 as Other, 46 as Russian, 36 as Ukrainian, 34 as German, 32 as Turkish, 31 as Polish, 25 as Chinese, 23 as Italian, 22 as Rusyn, 21 as Jewish, 20 as Bulgarian, 16 as Vietnamese, 15 as Croatian, 10 as Moravian, 9 as English, 6 as Albanian, 5 as Serbian, 5 as Romanian, 3 as Irish, 2 as Canadian, 1 as Silesian, 1 as Austrian and 1 as French.

Note on population: The difference values of population numbers in the table "Population statistic" and in the sections "Ethnicity" & "Religion" is caused by the use of various statistical methods.

=== Religion ===
Census 2021 (1+ %)
Religion	Number	Fraction
Roman Catholic Church	14,360	44.91%
None	10,822	33.85%
Not found out	2604	8.14%
Evangelical Church	1805	5.65%
Calvinist Church	936	2.93%
Church of the Brethren	399	1.25%
Total	31,974	

In year 2021 was 31,974 people by religion 14,360 from Roman Catholic Church, 10,822 from None, 2604 from Not found out, 1805 from Evangelical Church, 936 from Calvinist Church, 399 from Church of the Brethren, 198 from Greek Catholic Church, 122 from Ad hoc movements, 109 from Christian Congregations in Slovakia, 103 from Other, 90 from Other and not ascertained christian church, 86 from Jehovah's Witnesses, 60 from Islam, 54 from Buddhism, 53 from Eastern Orthodox Church, 32 from Baptists Church, 28 from United Methodist Church, 24 from Paganism and natural spirituality, 24 from Apostolic Church, 17 from Jewish community, 17 from Seventh-day Adventist Church, 13 from Old Catholic Church, 10 from Hinduism, 4 from Church of Jesus Christ of Latter-day Saints, 3 from Czechoslovak Hussite Church and 1 from Bahá'i Community.

=== Religious makeup ===
Roman Catholic (majority), Reformed Protestant (Calvinist), Moravian Brethren (the biggest congregation in Slovakia), Lutheran, Baptist, Old Catholic Church, Adventist of the 7th Day, Modrý kríž (Blue Cross), several Charismatic and Pentecostal communities, Jehovah's Witnesses, Muslim community (non-practising), Jewish community (non-practising), atheists

== Economy ==
=== Production ===
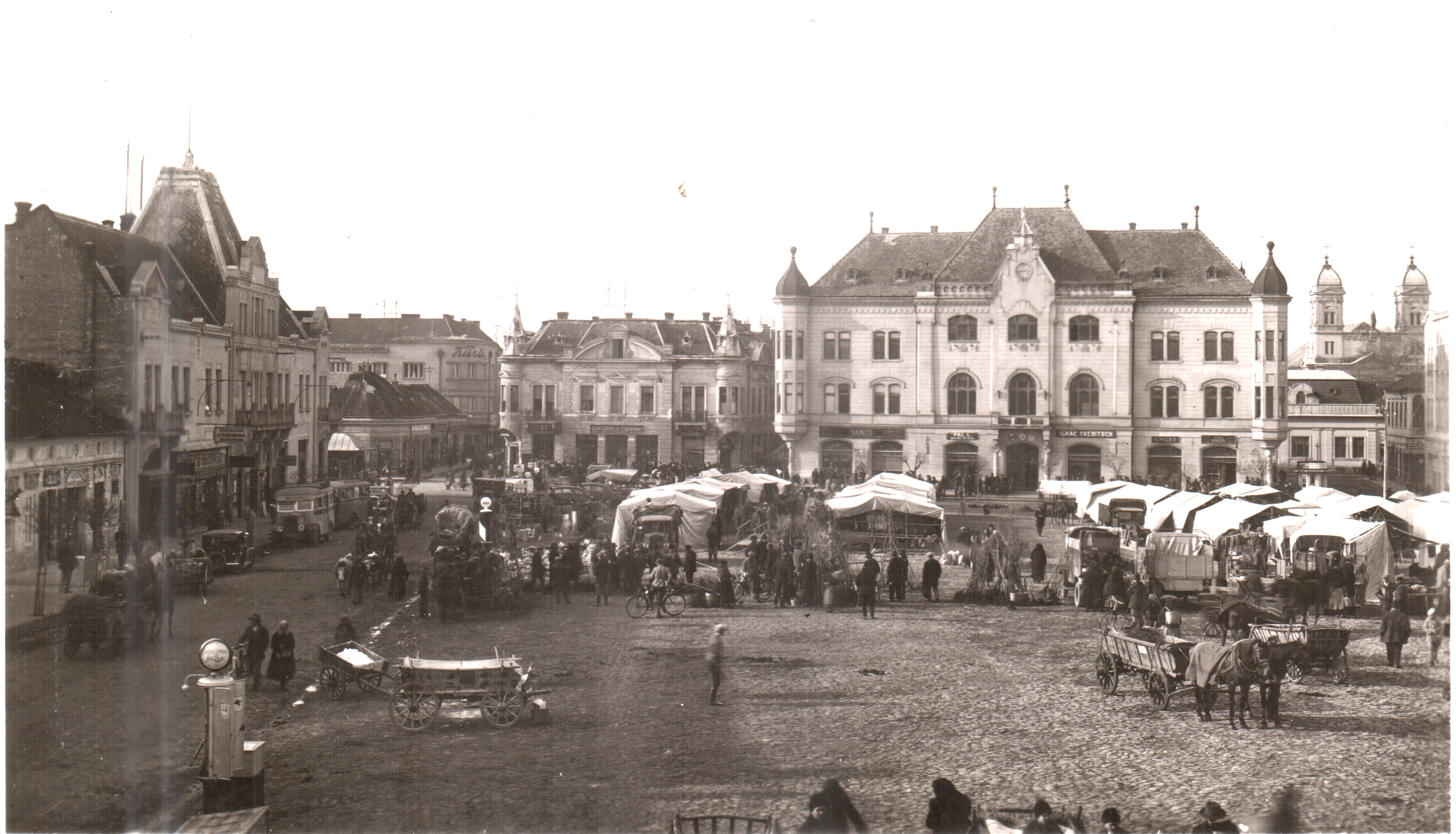
Main square – 1938

Textiles, cosmetics, furniture, products from locally obtained Golden Onyx, machinery and construction components, cereals, meat, eggs, dairy products, soft drinks, malt, wine (Levická frankovka is a trademark for locally produced red-wine). One of Slovakia's two nuclear power plants is in Mochovce, 12 kilometres (7.5 miles) north-west of Levice.

== Education ==
There are 8 elementary schools (7 secular including 1 Hungarian, and 1 Roman Catholic school), Gymnazium Andreja Vrabla, a general High School, a Hungarian Calvinist High School (Lyceum), a Business Academy, a Pedagogical and Social Academy, a Secondary Technical School, a Secondary Agricultural School and various apprentice schools.

== Main sights ==
- Levice Castle, built in a Gothic style as a trade-route guarding fort at the end of 13th century.
- Dobo Château, built by István Dobó, a hero of the siege of Eger, in the 1560s.

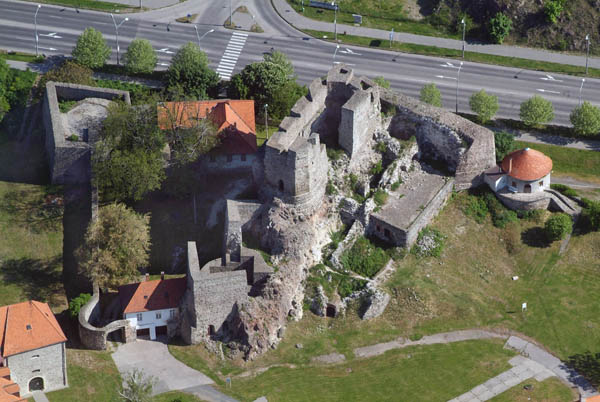
Aerial photography of Levice castle

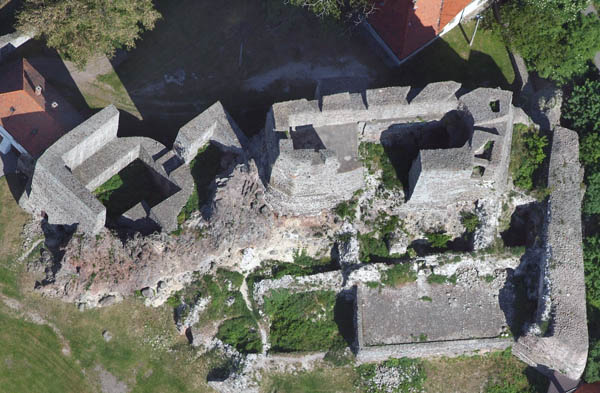
Aerial photography of Levice castle

=== Places of worship ===
Church St.Michael

- St Joseph's Church, Roman Catholic, accompanied by a baroque Franciscan convent. It is found close to the entrance to the château, and dates from the turn of the 18th century.
- St Michael's Church – Roman Catholic, found in St Michael's street (Sv. Michala). It is from the 2nd half of the 18th century
- Church of the Holy Spirit – Roman Catholic, in the Rybniky quarter. It is from the start of the 21st century
- Chapel of St Urban – Roman Catholic, F. Hecku street, 1770s
- Evanjelický a. v. kostol – Lutheran, Cs. armady street, 1840s to 1930s
- Zborový dom (Congregational House) – Lutheran, next to the latter
- Kostol Reformovanej cirkvi – Calvinist, Sv. Michala street, end of 18th century
- Zborový dom (Congregational House) – Brethren Church, S. Chalupku street, 1983–85
- Synagogue – Jewish, K. Kittenberger street, half of 19th century

=== Other sights ===
- Schoeller's Mill – built at the end of the 19th century, production was cancelled in 1998, rebuilt into a complex of luxury shops, offices, dwellings and entertainment facilities.
- Main square – a good collection of Art-Nouveau and eclectic buildings.
- Town hall – erected in 1902, second floor built-up while lifting the roof by a screw mechanism in 1927.
- Teachers Academy – secondary school, E point of the Kalvaria hill, N of the main square, built in 1911 as a mix of the late Art-Nouveau and Italian trecento-influenced historism.

=== Functionalist architectures ===
- District Court Building – corner of Mlynska and Zahradna streets, projected by Milan Michal Harminc
- Fried's House – corner of L. Stura and Sv. Michala streets
- Strasser's House – Sturova street, next to the Fried's House
- Fertsek Brothers House – corner of Soltesova square and Ceskoslovenskej armady street
- Munk's House – corner of Mlynska and Zahradna streets
- Reitmann's House – Mlynska street, a passage to I. Krasku street
- Eisler's House – corner of Mlynska and L. Stura streets
- Police District Headquarters Building – former Seat of District Authority, crossing of Kalvinske square and Sv. Michala street
- Health Insurance Company Building – M. R. Stefanik street, later Infant Hospital

== Nearby places of interest ==
- Horšianska Dolina (Horša Valley) – nature preserve with unique plant and animal endemics, folk architecture in Horša
- Kalinčiakovo – this village has a tiny but well preserved Romanesque church dating from the 12th century (see Romanesque church in Kalinčiakovo) and the swimming pool of Margita-Ilona
- Hronský Beňadik – medieval fort-monastery with Gothic entrance, tombs and memorabilia of Hungarian noblemen
- Želiezovce– Neoclassical residence of Count Eszterhazy, and Soví zámoček (Owl Château) where the Austrian composer Franz Schubert taught music
- Santovka– mineral water springs and swimming pool
- Brhlovce– cave-like dwellings cut into volcanic rock, nominated as a UNESCO World Heritage site
- Čajkov– known for local folk costumes and the annual wine harvest festival
- Pukanec– tiny mining town once enjoying the status of Free royal town, still known for hand-made pottery
- Sitno– volcanic peak in the Štiavnica Mountains, Celtic funeral place, medieval castle ruins, and a botanic nature reserve featuring rare rose species

== Notable people ==
- Eva Borušovičová (1970–2025), director, screenwriter, writer, born in Levice
- Eugene Fodor (1905–1991), writer; born in Levice
- Pál Kadosa (1903–1983), composer and pianist; born in Levice
- Kálmán Kittenberger (1881–1958), geographer; born in Levice
- Peter Lovaš (born 1978), para table tennis player, born in Levice
- Mia Pohánková (born 2008), tennis player, born in Levice
- Géza Steinhardt (1873–1944), Hungarian Jewish actor; born in Levice

== Twin towns ==
Levice is twinned with:

- Boskovice, Czech Republic
- Érd, Hungary
- Náměšť na Hané, Czech Republic
- Ruda Śląska, Poland
- Skierniewice, Poland
