= Eugene Fodor =

Eugene Fodor may refer to:

- Eugene Fodor (violinist) (1950–2011), American classical violinist
- Eugene Fodor (writer) (1905–1991), American writer of travel literature
