= Levice Castle =

Historic site in Slovakia

- Levice, Slovakia
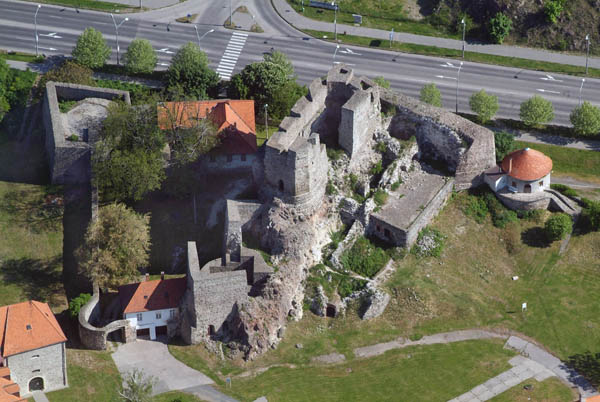
- Aerial view

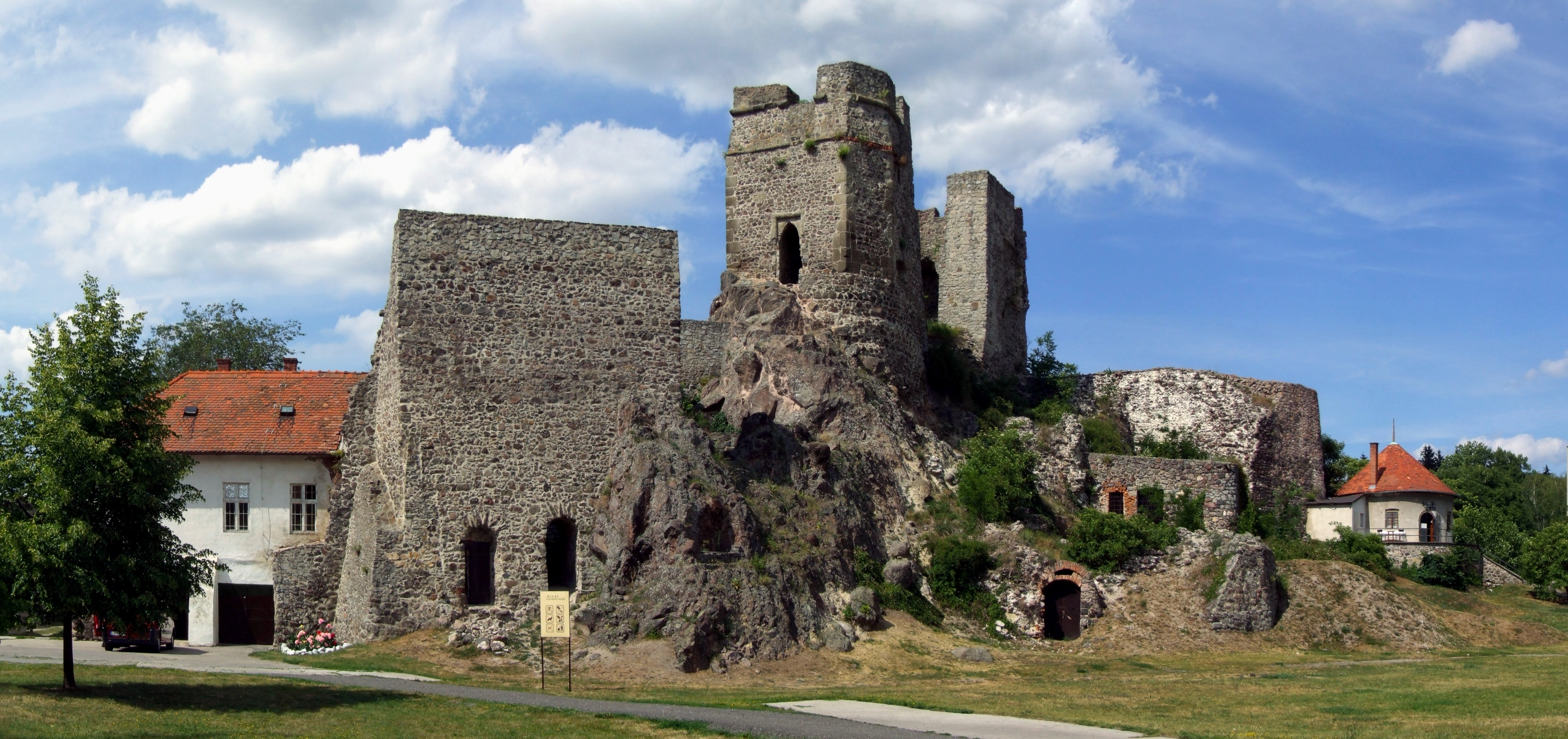
- Close-up

Site information
- Type: Castle

Location
- Coordinates: 48.221667°N 18.600833°E

Levice Castle (Slovak: Hrad Levice or Levický hrad) are the ruins of a Gothic castle located in Levice, Slovakia.

== History ==
The castle was built in the late 13th century as part of the southern defense system for the central Slovak mining towns (Banská Štiavnica, Kremnica, Banská Bystrica). It was situated at the highest point of a rocky hill just above the town, surrounded by wetlands of the Hron River and the Podlužiansky potok. It is mentioned in documents in 1318. Between the Middle Ages and the Renaissance, it often changed owners. It later became part of the estate of Matthew III Csák, turning it into a royal castle. In 1388, it came into the possession of the Lévai family.

In 1434, the castle caught fire, but was rebuilt immediately afterwards. In 1529, it fell to the crown and belonged to the Bars County. After the death of Gábor Lévai, the castle came into the possession of the nobleman Melchior Balassa. His exploits resulted in the siege of the castle by the imperial army, resulting in the capitulation of the castle garrison and the execution of some of its members directly under the castle walls.

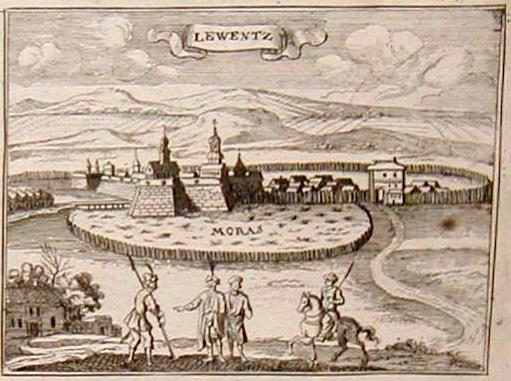
The castle in the 17th century

After the extinction of the Lévai family in 1553, the castle again fell to the king, who incorporated the castle into the system of anti-Turkish fortresses. In subsequent periods, the castle was owned by several different owners – the Dobó family (Ferenc became the governor of Tekovo in 1574), the Kollonich family, the Csák family and the Esterházy family. In the mid-16th century, the castle was repaired and in 1571 a Renaissance mansion with corner bastions was built in the lower courtyard. The castle fortifications were also improved in the first half of the 17th century (after 1635, the outer fortifications were connected to the city walls, from which the castle was separated by a moat). According to parliamentary resolutions, subjects of the northern capitals (Orava and Liptov) also participated in the fortification works.

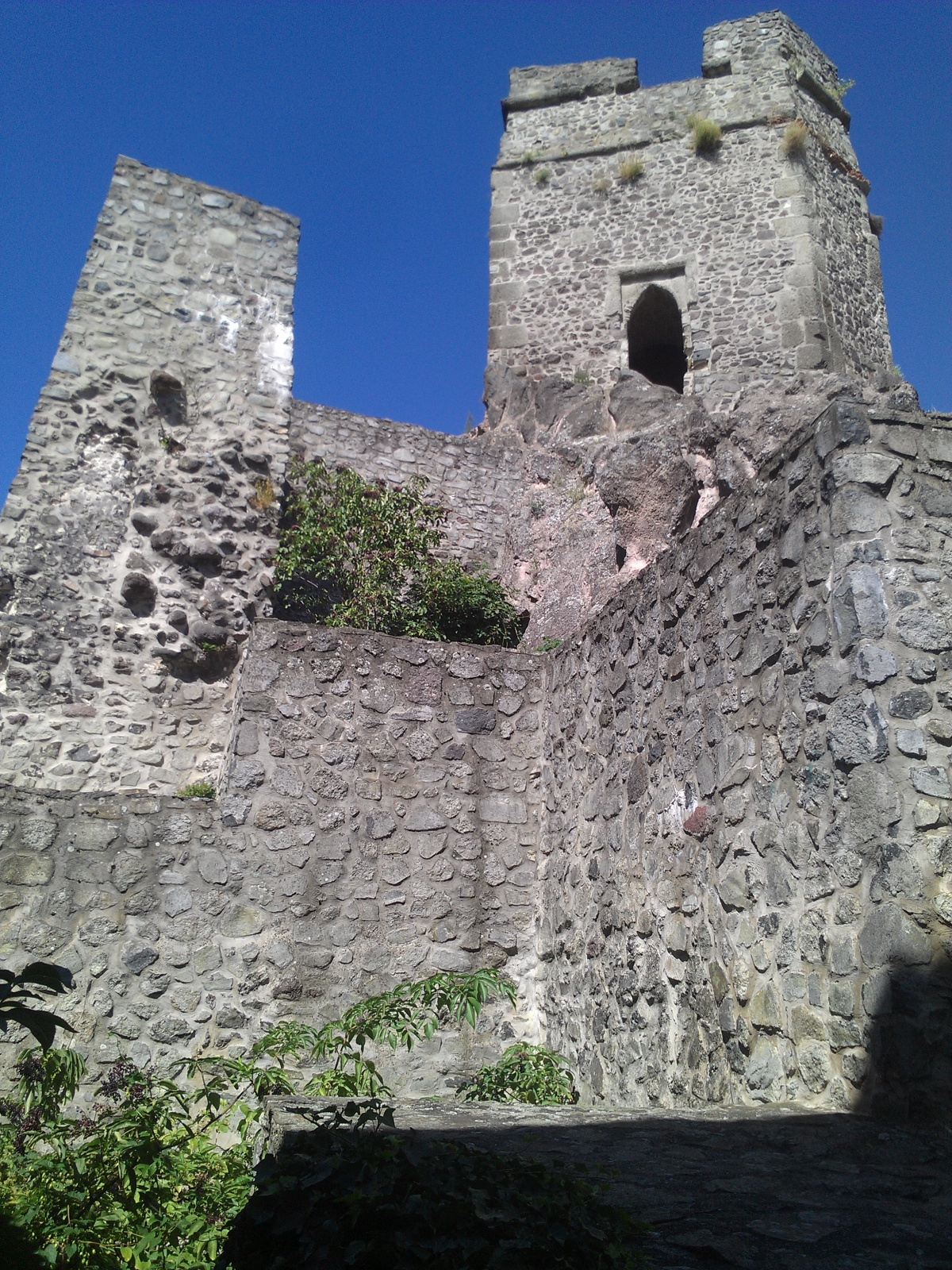
Main tower

The history of the castle was influenced by Turkish military actions. The Turks first appeared under its walls in 1544. During another siege in 1663, they conquered the castle. However, a year later they were driven out of Levice in the Battle of Levice and the castle was thoroughly fortified again under the supervision of the then military commander Jean-Louis Raduit de Souches. After the city fire in 1696, the heavily damaged castle began to be demolished. In 1699, the military garrison left the castle, which lost its defensive character. However, the troops of Francis II Rákóczi still held it in the years 1702 – 1709, but before leaving they completed its liquidation. Part of the buildings (the bastion and the mansion) remained preserved and were repaired after 1710.

== Museum ==
The Tekov Museum in Levice was established in 1927 after a donation of a large collection by Jozef Nécsey. Over the years, the museum expanded its collection to include archaeological and ethnographic items, paintings, family archives, and books. Its first location was on the second floor of a town house, with an exhibition called Nécsey's Room. Later, the museum received donations from local residents, schools, and institutions, including artifacts from the former Piarist Gymnasium and collections from Austro-Hungarian traveler Kálmán Kittenberger. Since 1958, the museum has been housed in the Captain's Building, which underwent extensive reconstruction from 1982 to 1998. In 2001, a permanent exhibition dedicated to the history of pharmacy and the castle was opened, along with the Jozef Nécsey Gallery, which serves as the entrance to the permanent exhibits. The museum also uses the Palace of Dobó for exhibitions. It focuses on ethnographic and natural science research, collecting items from regions such as the eastern part of the Danube Upland, Štiavnické Hills, Pohronský Inovec, and the Krupina Plain.

== See also ==
- List of castles in Slovakia
