= Romanesque church in Kalinčiakovo =

Church in Kalinčiakovo, Slovakia

Religion
- Affiliation: Reformed Christian Church in Slovakia
- District: Levice

Location
- Location: Kalinčiakovo
- State: Slovakia
- Interactive map of Romanesque church in Kalinčiakovo
- Coordinates: 48°12′13″N 18°40′08″E

Architecture
- Type: Church
- Style: Romanesque
- Materials: stone

The Romanesque church in Kalinčiakovo is a Reformed chapel in the village of Kalinčiakovo (Levice district, Slovakia). Originally built in the 12th century in the Romanesque style, the building has been the property of the Reformed Church in Slovakia since 1655.

== Renovations ==
After a fire damaged the building, the chapel was rebuilt between 1833 and 1835, with further renovations in 1932 and from 1957 to 1958. The 1833 fire revealed some frescoes depicting celestial bodies and animals.

== Structure ==
The church is built from hewn stones and strengthened with stooks. The typical Romanesque semicircular apse is vaulted by concha. The apse is continued by aisle. The Romanesque windows survived the fire. In 1932 the Romanesque portal was revealed on the south frontlet. The Classicist organ dates from 1833. Originally the church was enclosed within a fortress wall of which only a slightly rising entrenchment remained.
