= Kalinčiakovo =

Coordinates: 48°12′N 18°40′E

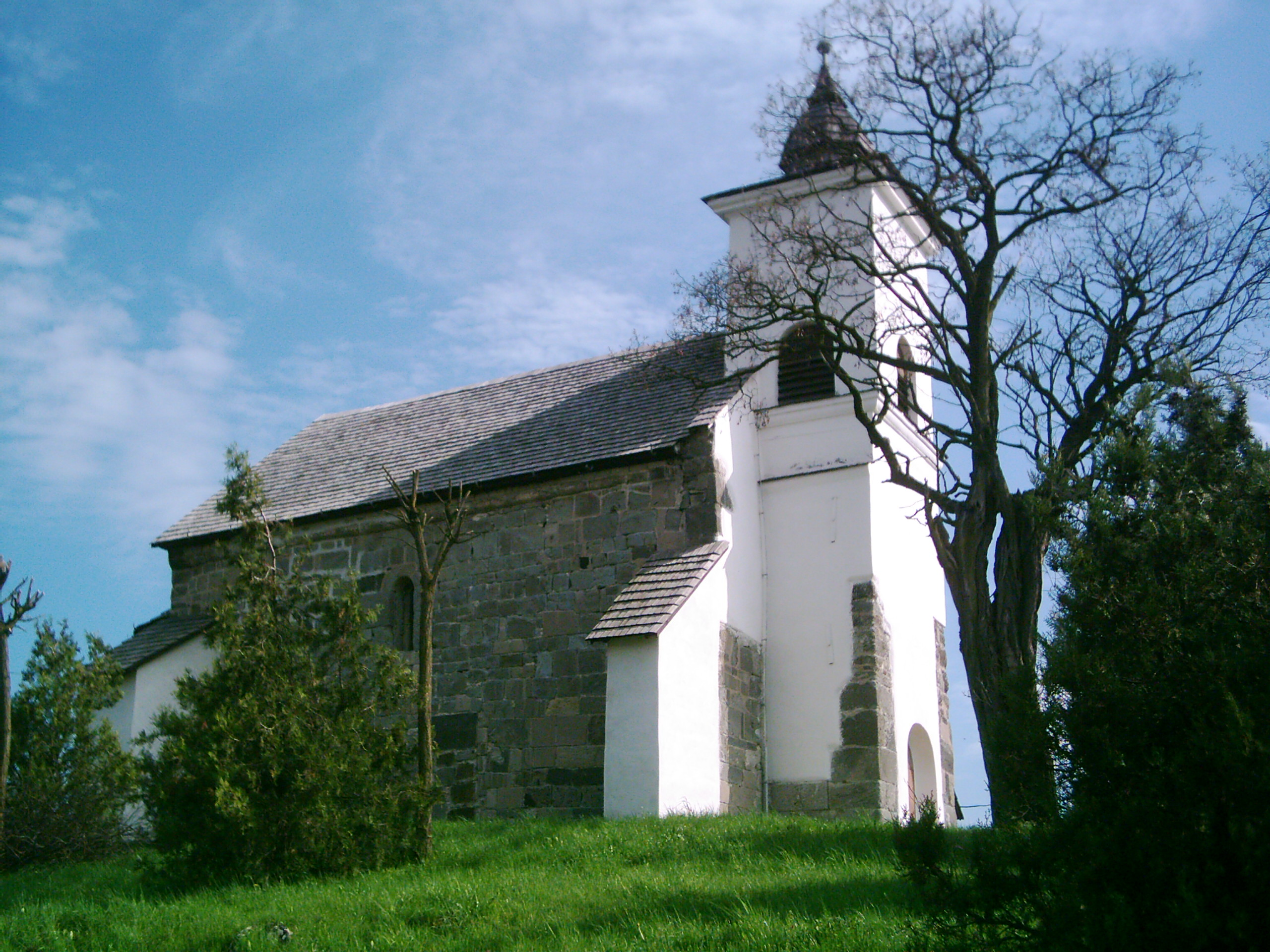
Romanesque church in Kalinčiakovo

Kalinčiakovo (Hungarian: Hontvarsány) is a village in the Levice District of western Slovakia, now administratively a part of the town of Levice. It is best known for a well-preserved 12th-century Romanesque church, currently belonging to a Reformed congregation.

Notable people from Kalinčiakovo include the economist Imrich Karvaš (1903-1981), governor of the National Bank of the Slovak Republic (1939–1945) from 1939 until arrested by the Gestapo in 1944.

== See also ==
- Romanesque church in Kalinčiakovo
