= Eugene Fodor (writer) =

American writer and publisher

- Born: October 14, 1905; Levice, Austria-Hungary
- Died: February 18, 1991 (aged 85); Litchfield, Connecticut
- Occupation: Writer
- Spouse: Vlasta Zobel
- Writing career
- Genre: Travel literature
- Notable work: On the Continent—The Entertaining Travel Annual
- Notable awards: American Society of Travel Agents World Travel Congress Hall of Fame

Eugene Fodor (/ˈfoʊdər/; October 14, 1905 – February 18, 1991) was a Hungarian-American writer of travel literature.

== Biography ==
Fodor was born in Léva, Hungary (then Austria-Hungary; now Levice, Slovakia). Believing that travel guides of his time were boring, he wrote a guide to Europe, On the Continent—The Entertaining Travel Annual, which was published in 1936 by Francis Aldor, Aldor Publications, London and was reprinted in 2011 by Random House as an e-book.

In his youth, Fodor studied political economics at the Sorbonne and at the University of Grenoble in France. Fodor joined the US Army in 1942 during World War II, and was transferred to the Office of Strategic Services, serving in Europe. His spy status was kept a secret until nearly thirty years later, when it was revealed by E. Howard Hunt. He married Vlasta Zobel, a Czech national, in 1948.

In 1949, he founded Fodor's in Paris, France. He created Fodor Modern Guides, operating initially from Paris but moving to Connecticut in 1964. He lived there until his death in 1991.
