= Čajkov =

Village and municipality in Slovakia

Čajkov Csejkő
- Municipality
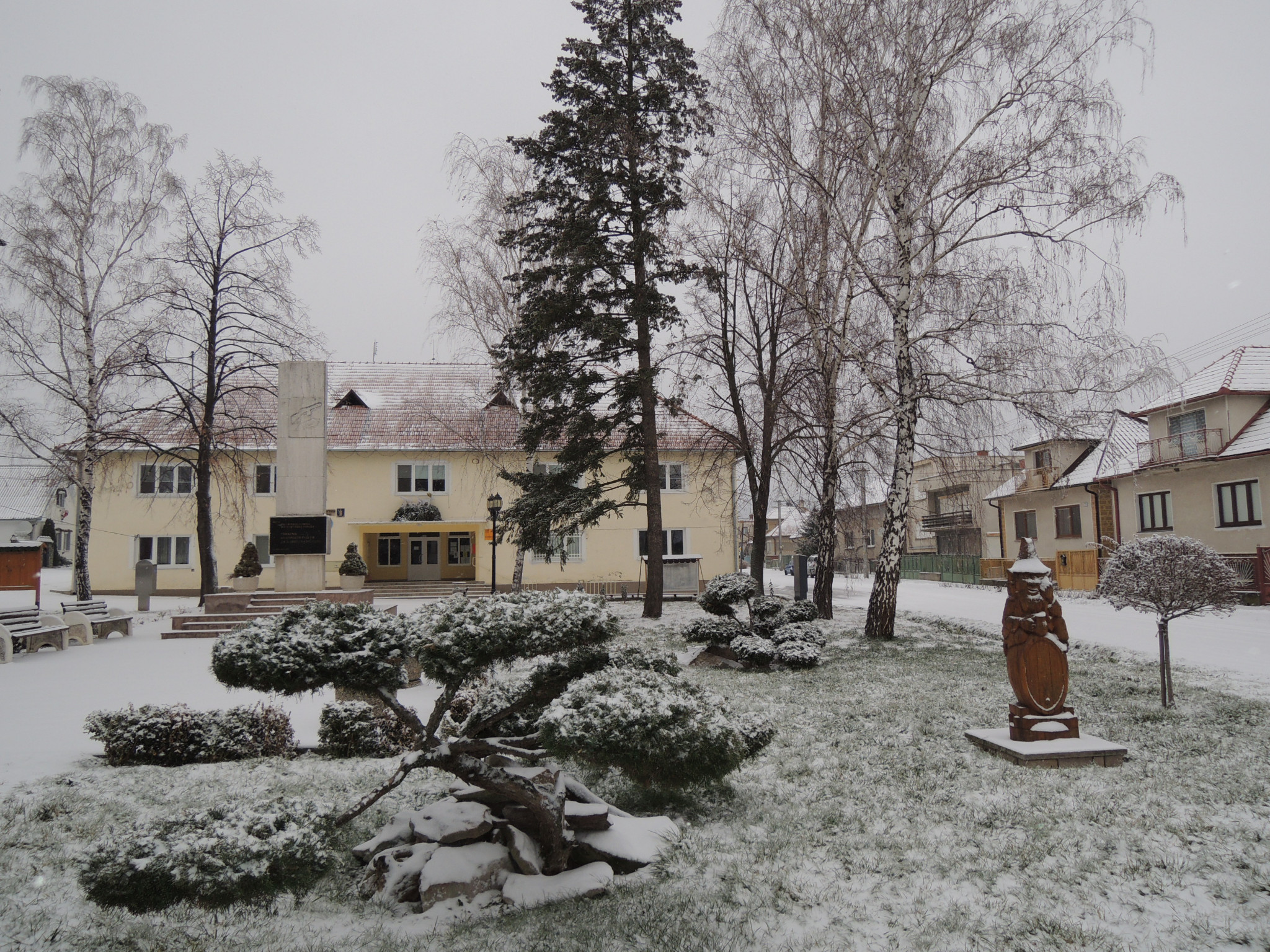
- Čajkov municipal office

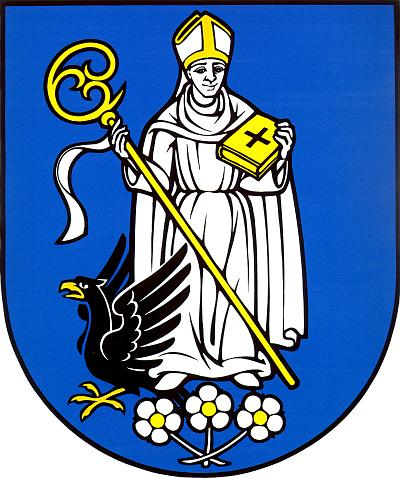
- Flag Coat of arms

- Location of Čajkov in the Nitra Region Location of Čajkov in Slovakia
- Coordinates: 48.28°N 18.60°E
- Country: Slovakia
- Region: Nitra Region
- District: Levice District
- First mentioned: 1276

Area
  - Total: 23.93 km^{2} (9.24 sq mi)
- Elevation: 190 m (620 ft)

Population (2025)
  - Total: 928
- Time zone: UTC+1 (CET)
  - Summer (DST): UTC+2 (CEST)
- Postal code: 935 24
- Area code: +421 36
- Vehicle registration plate (until 2022): LV
- Website: www.obeccajkov.sk

Čajkov (Hungarian: Csejkő) is a village and municipality in the Levice District in the Nitra Region of south-west Slovakia.

The village is known for its vineyards and wine production.

A one-day festival of contemporary electronic dance music called Debercha project takes place in Čajkov annually.

== History ==
In historical records the village was first mentioned in 1276.

== Geography ==
The municipality lies at an altitude of 190 metres (620 ft) and covers an area of 23.93 km^{2} (9.24 sq mi) (2025).

== Population ==
Population statistic (10 years)
Year	1995	2005	2015	2025
Count	1083	1025	962	928
Difference		−5.35%	−6.14%	−3.53%

Population statistic
Year	2024	2025
Count	930	928
Difference		−0.21%

It has a population of 928 people (31 December 2025).

=== Ethnicity ===
Census 2021 (1+ %)
Ethnicity	Number	Fraction
Slovak	939	98.11%
Not found out	12	1.25%
Total	957	

In year 2021 was 957 people by ethnicity 939 as Slovak, 12 as Not found out, 5 as Hungarian, 1 as Czech, 1 as Ukrainian, 1 as Russian, 1 as Other, 1 as French and 1 as English.

Note on population: The difference values of population numbers in the table "Population statistic" and in the sections "Ethnicity" & "Religion" is caused by the use of various statistical methods.

=== Religion ===
Census 2021 (1+ %)
Religion	Number	Fraction
Roman Catholic Church	780	81.5%
None	145	15.15%
Not found out	12	1.25%
Total	957	

In year 2021 was 957 people by religion 780 from Roman Catholic Church, 145 from None, 12 from Not found out, 6 from Evangelical Church, 4 from Calvinist Church, 3 from Greek Catholic Church, 3 from Ad hoc movements, 2 from Other and not ascertained christian church, 1 from Eastern Orthodox Church and 1 from Christian Congregations in Slovakia.

== Facilities ==
The village has a gym, a football pitch and a tennis court

== Genealogical resources ==
The records for genealogical research are available at the state archive "Statny Archiv in Nitra, Slovakia"

- Roman Catholic church records (births/marriages/deaths): 1721-1896 (parish A)

== See also ==
- List of municipalities and towns in Slovakia
