= Starý Tekov =

Starý Tekov Óbars
- Municipality
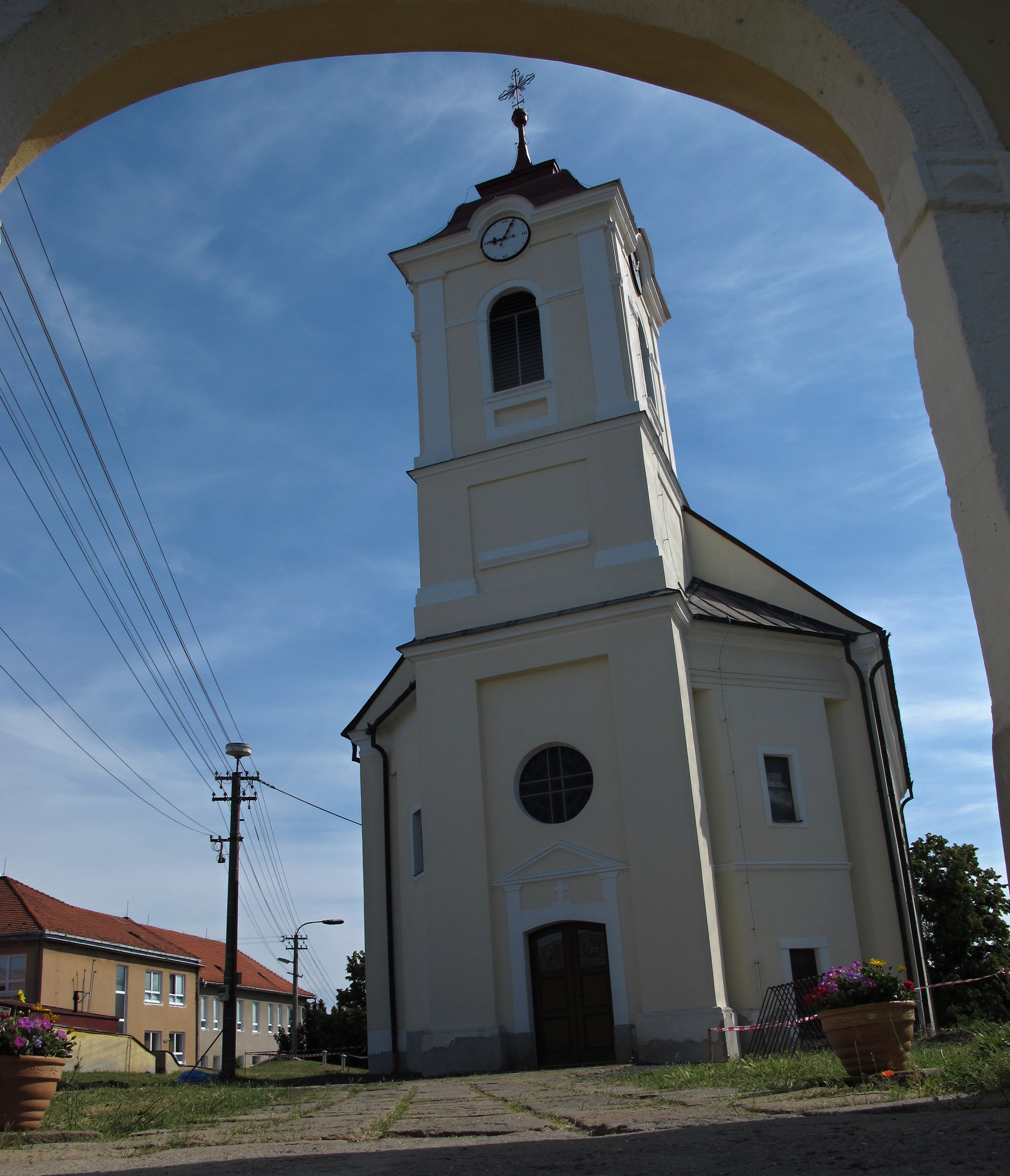
- Church of the Assumption of the Virgin Mary

- Flag

- Location of Starý Tekov in the Nitra Region Location of Starý Tekov in Slovakia
- Coordinates: 48.25°N 18.53°E
- Country: Slovakia
- Region: Nitra Region
- District: Levice District
- First mentioned: 1075

Area
  - Total: 10.57 km^{2} (4.08 sq mi)
- Elevation: 167 m (548 ft)

Population (2025)
  - Total: 1,596
- Time zone: UTC+1 (CET)
  - Summer (DST): UTC+2 (CEST)
- Postal code: 935 26
- Area code: +421 36
- Vehicle registration plate (until 2022): LV
- Website: www.starytekov.sk

Starý Tekov (German: Bersenberg, Altbarsch, Altbersenberg, (Alt-)Bersenburg; in earlier times also Berschenberg, Alt Berschenburg; Hungarian: Óbars) is a village and municipality in the Levice District in the Nitra Region of Slovakia.

== History ==
In historical records the village was first mentioned in 1075.

== Geography ==
The municipality lies at an altitude of 167 metres (548 ft) and covers an area of 10.57 km^{2} (4.08 sq mi) (2025).

== Population ==
Population statistic (10 years)
Year	1995	2005	2015	2025
Count	1481	1466	1427	1596
Difference		−1.01%	−2.66%	+11.84%

Population statistic
Year	2024	2025
Count	1597	1596
Difference		−0.06%

It has a population of 1596 people (31 December 2025).

=== Ethnicity ===
Census 2021 (1+ %)
Ethnicity	Number	Fraction
Slovak	1423	95.18%
Not found out	68	4.54%
Total	1495	

In year 2021 was 1495 people by ethnicity 1423 as Slovak, 68 as Not found out, 7 as Hungarian, 4 as Czech, 4 as Other, 1 as Ukrainian, 1 as Italian, 1 as Serbian and 1 as Russian.

Note on population: The difference values of population numbers in the table "Population statistic" and in the sections "Ethnicity" & "Religion" is caused by the use of various statistical methods.

=== Religion ===
Census 2021 (1+ %)
Religion	Number	Fraction
Roman Catholic Church	1169	78.19%
None	202	13.51%
Not found out	64	4.28%
Evangelical Church	15	1%
Total	1495	

In year 2021 was 1495 people by religion 1169 from Roman Catholic Church, 202 from None, 64 from Not found out, 15 from Evangelical Church, 10 from Greek Catholic Church, 7 from Ad hoc movements, 5 from Calvinist Church, 4 from Other, 3 from Islam, 3 from Church of the Brethren, 2 from Old Catholic Church, 2 from Eastern Orthodox Church, 2 from Jehovah's Witnesses, 2 from Christian Congregations in Slovakia, 1 from Jewish community, 1 from Other and not ascertained christian church, 1 from Hinduism, 1 from Buddhism and 1 from Apostolic Church.

== Facilities ==
The village has a public library a gym and football pitch.
