= Imrich Karvaš =

Slovak economist (1903–1981)

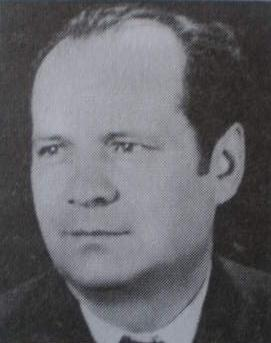
- Karvaš (pre-1943)
- Born: 25 February 1903; Kalinčiakovo, Austria-Hungary
- Died: 22 February 1981 (aged 77); Bratislava, Czechoslovakia
- Spouse: Helena Karvašová
- Children: 3
- Relatives: Milan Karvaš (son); Ľubica Karvašová (granddaughter)

Academic background
- Education: Comenius University in Bratislava

Academic work
- Institutions: Governor of the Slovak National Bank
- Notable ideas: Financed the Slovak National Uprising
- Awards: 1991 Order of Tomáš Garrigue Masaryk; 2001 Pribina Cross, 1st class

Imrich Karvaš (25 February 1903 – 22 February 1981) was a Slovak economist.

== Life ==
Imrich Karvaš was born in Varšany, on 25 February 1903. He entered the Law Faculty of Comenius University in Bratislava in 1921, graduating in 1925. After graduation he pursued further studies in Paris and Strasbourg before returning to Slovakia to combine the role of academic economist with working for major financial institutions. In 1938 he entered Jan Syrový's government as Minister without portfolio. With the establishment of the First Slovak Republic in 1939, he was appointed Governor of the Slovak National Bank, a position he combined with that of full professor of national economics at the University of Bratislava. In this capacity, he provided information to the Bratislava Working Group (a Jewish resistance group) about anti-Jewish measures.

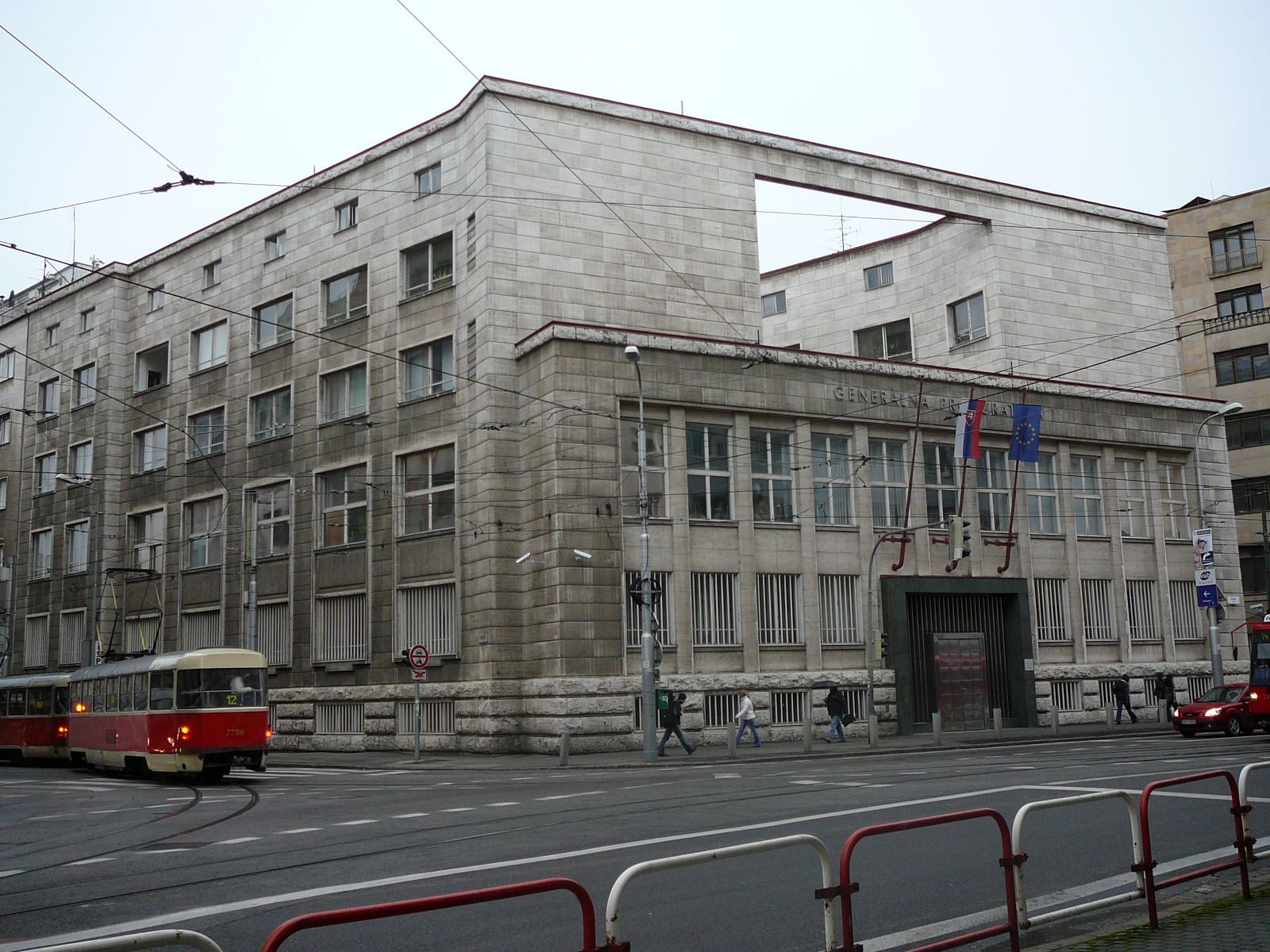
Head office of the Slovak National Bank in Bratislava (presently General Prosecutors Office), designed by architect Emil Belluš

As the Governor of the Slovak National Bank he helped organize the Slovak National Uprising. To help finance the uprising he redistributed the financial and commodity reserves of the state to the center of the uprising in the city of Banská Bystrica.

In September 1944, during the aftermath of the Slovak National Uprising, Karvaš was arrested by the Gestapo and sent to Flossenburg concentration camp. He was condemned to death in February 1945, but the sentence was never carried out. Karvaš was among the prisoners transferred to Tyrol in April 1945 and liberated there.

In 1947 Karvaš published his major work, Základy hospodárskej vedy (The Basics of the Economic Science), and went on to serve as dean and pro-dean of the Faculty of Law. In May 1949 the new Communist authorities sentenced him to two years in prison. In 1958 he was sentenced to a further 17 years, on charges of espionage and treason, but after 1960 he was rehabilitated, living the rest of his life in relative obscurity. He died in Bratislava on 22 February 1981.

== Legacy ==
On 25 February 2020, the National Bank of Slovakia unveiled a bust of Imrich Karvaš located on the bank's headquarters.

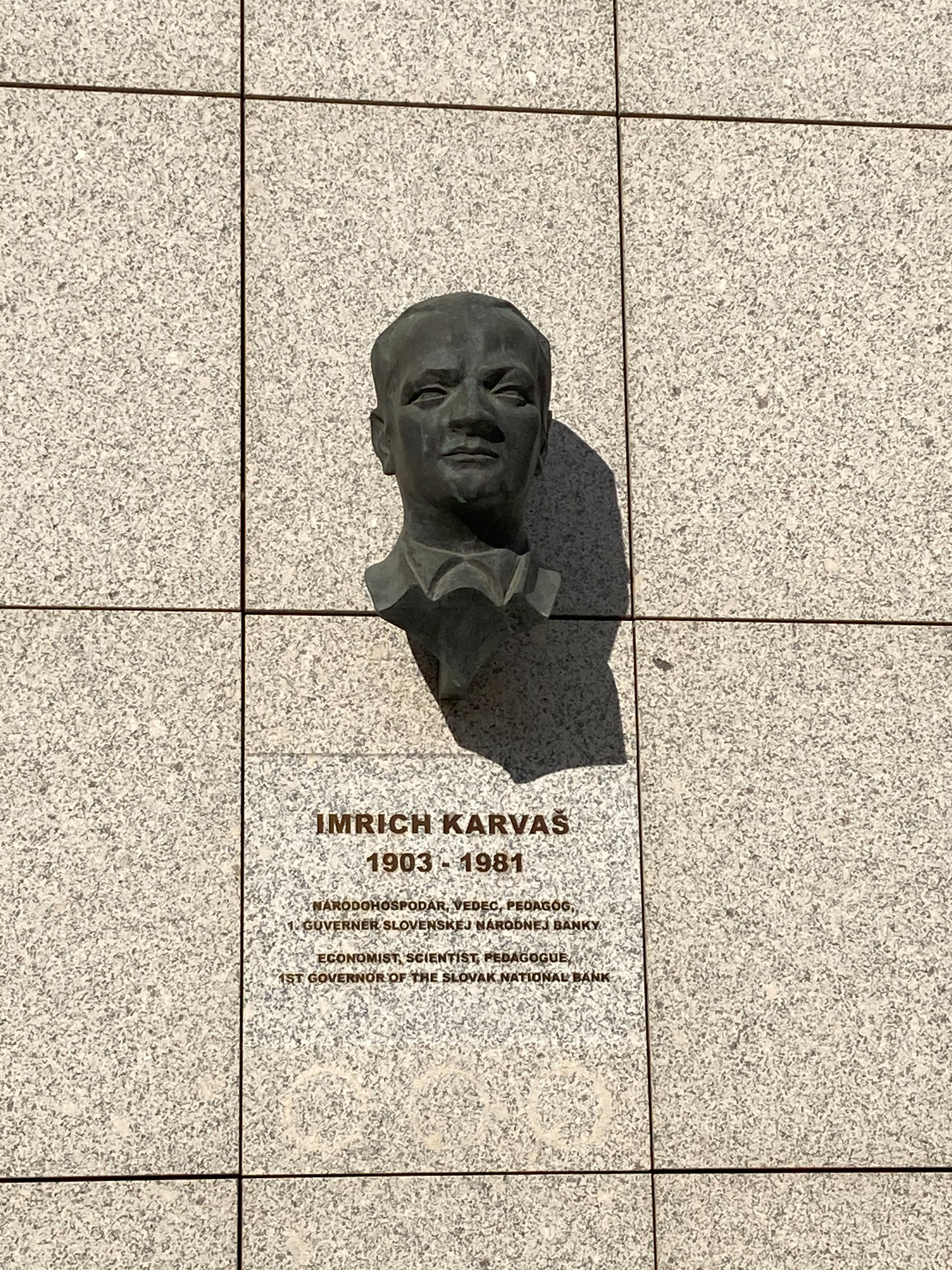
Imrich Karvaš bust on the National Bank of Slovakia HQ

The street in Bratislava, where the National Bank of Slovakia in located is named after Imrich Karvaš. In 1991, Karvaš was posthumously awarded the Order of Tomáš Garrigue Masaryk by the president of Czechoslovakia Václav Havel. In 2001, the president of Slovakia Rudolf Schuster awarded Karvaš posthumously the Pribina Cross, 1st class in 2001.

== Family ==
Karvaš had three children. His son Milan Karvaš was a scientist and published a biography of his father, which serves as an important sources for historians studying contributions of Imrich Karvaš. The granddaughter of Imrich Karvaš, Ľubica Karvašová was elected to the European Parliament in 2024.

== Works ==
- Sjednocení výrobních podmínek v zemích českých a na Slovensku (Industrial employment in Czechoslovakia). Knihovna Sboru pro výzkum Slovenska a Podkarpatské Rusi při Slovanském ústavě v Praze 7; V Praze: Sbor pro výzkum Slovenska a Podkarpatské Rusi, 1933.
- Problematika času v hospodárskej teorii (An inquiry into the problem of time). Práce Učené společnosti Šafaříkovy v Bratislavě 24; Bratislava: Učená společnost Šafaříkova, 1937.
- Základy hospodárskej vedy (Principles of economic science). Martin, 1947.
- Moje pamäti: V pazúroch gestapa (My memories: In the clutches of the Gestapo). Bratislava: NVK International, 1994.

== Sources ==
- Slovakia and the Slovaks: A Concise Encyclopedia, edited by Milan Strhan, David P. Daniel (Encyclopedical Institute of the Slovak Academy of Sciences, 1994), p. 307.
- World Biography, Volume 1 (Institute for Research in Biography, 1947), p. 501.
