= Peace of Zsitvatorok =

1606 peace treaty

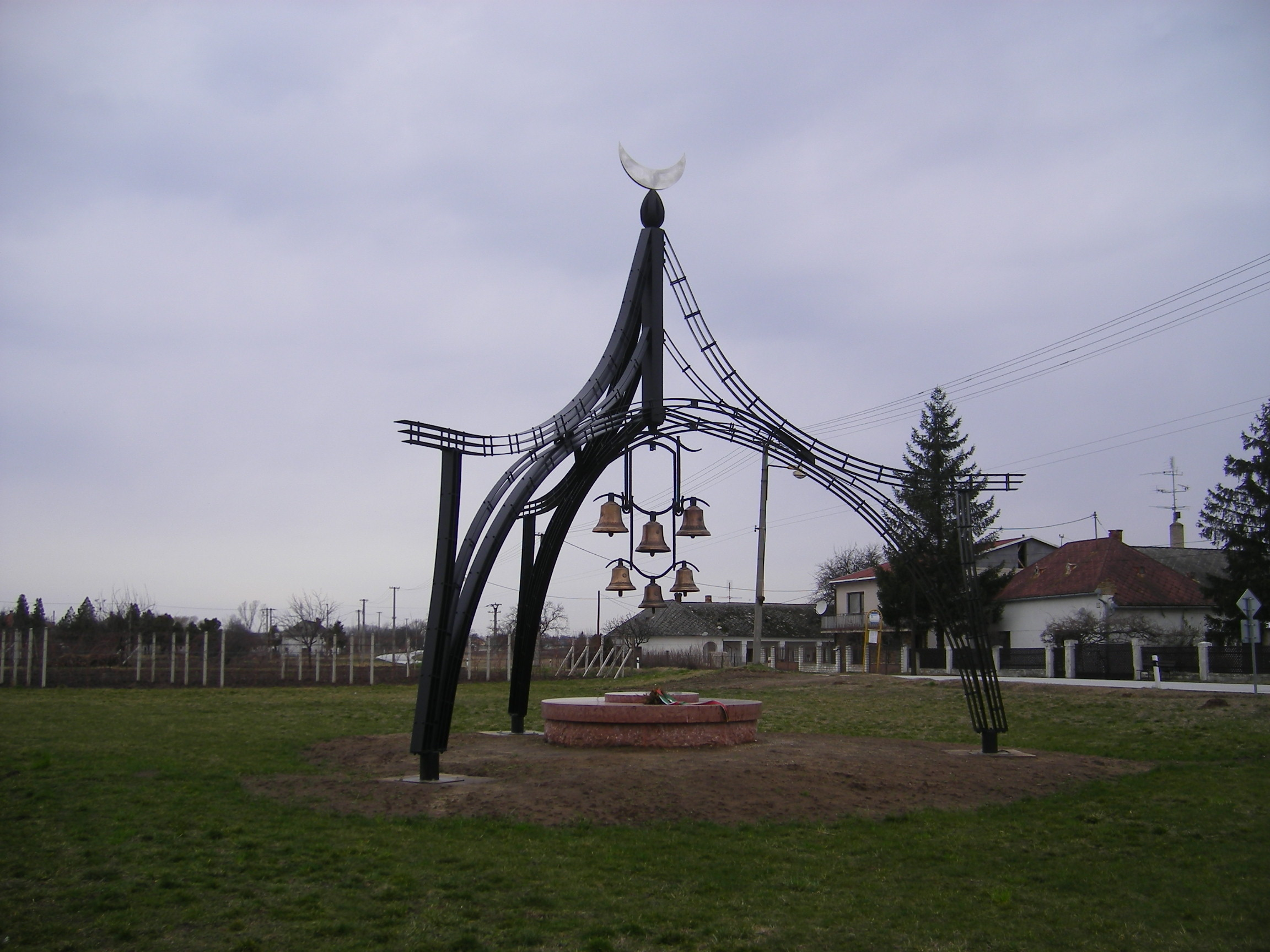
- Peace of Zsitvatorok Memorial in Radvaň nad Dunajom
- Type: Peace
- Signed: 11 November 1606
- Location: Zsitvatorok
- Ratified: 9 November 1606
- Original signatories: (Ottoman Empire) Ahmed I (Holy Roman Empire) Matthias
- Parties: Ottoman Empire; Habsburg Monarchy
- Languages: Ottoman Turkish; Hungarian

The Peace of Zsitvatorok (or Treaty of Sitvatorok) was a peace treaty which ended the 13-year Long Turkish War between the Ottoman Empire and the Habsburg monarchy on 11 November 1606. The treaty was part of a system of peace treaties which put an end to the anti-Habsburg uprising of Stephen Bocskai (1604–1606). The treaty was negotiated between 24 October and 11 November 1606 ad Situa Torock, at the former mouth of the Žitava River (Hungarian: Zsitva), which flows into the Danube in Royal Hungary (today part of Slovakia). This location would later become the small settlement of Žitavská Tôňa (Hungarian: Zsitvatorok), a part of the municipality of Radvaň nad Dunajom (Hungarian: Dunaradvány).

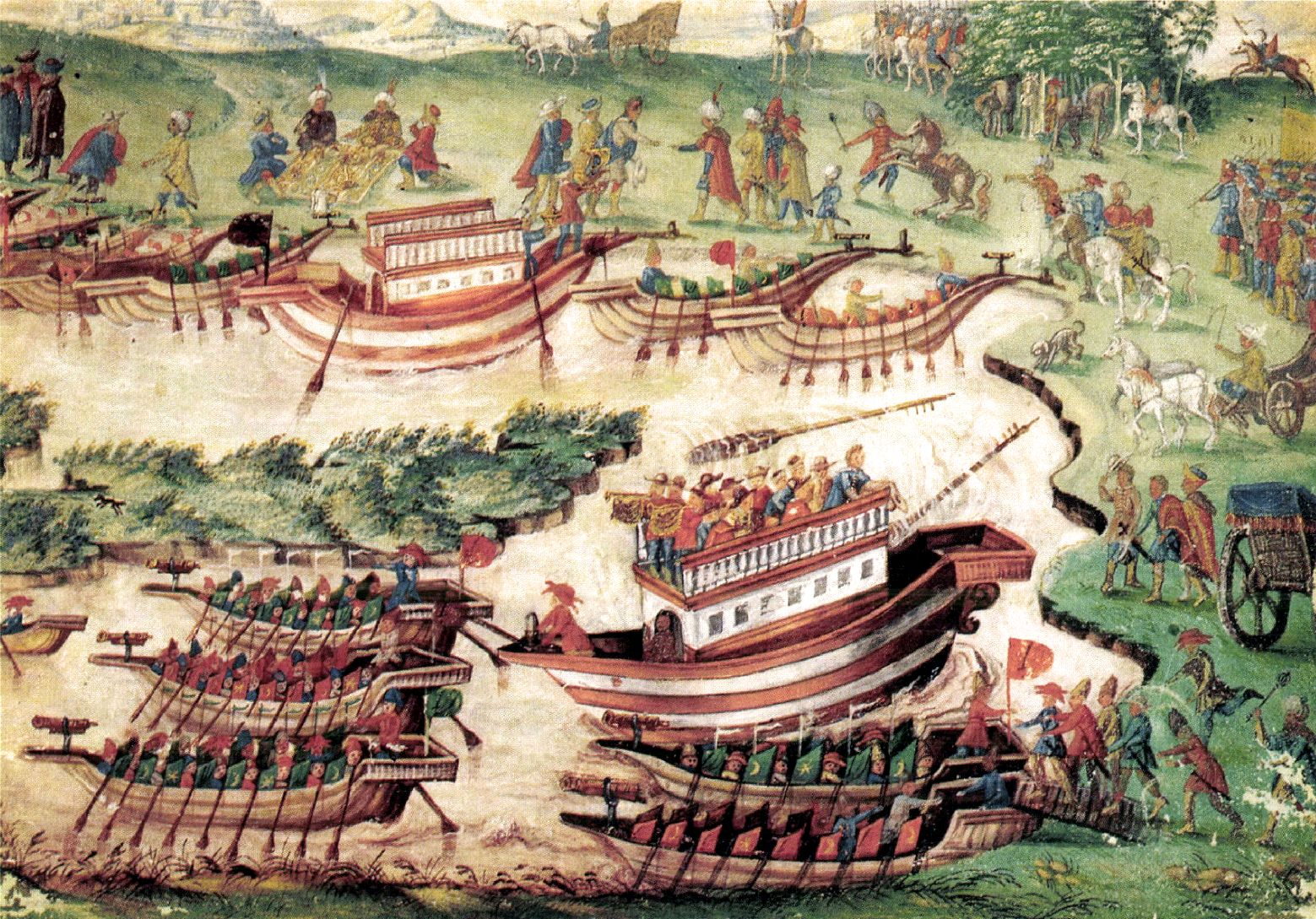
Peace Negotiations in Zsitvatorok (1606, tempera on paper, from the Ottó Herman Museum)

The peace was signed for a term of 20 years and has been interpreted in different ways by diplomatic historians. Differences between the Ottoman Turkish and the Hungarian texts of the treaty encouraged different interpretations, e.g. the Hungarians offered 200,000 florins as a once-and-for-all tribute (instead of the annual tributes of 30,000 guldens given before the war), whereas the Ottoman text foresaw that the payment was to be repeated after three years. The treaty prohibited Ottoman looting campaigns into the territory of Royal Hungary, and stipulated that Hungarian settlements under Ottoman rule could collect taxes themselves by means of village judges. The Ottomans also acknowledged the tax-free privilege of nobles. However, the Ottomans never really complied with these terms. The treaty also explicitly included the Crimean Khanate as a vassal of the Ottoman Empire.

The treaty was signed by Sultan Ahmed I and Archduke Matthias of Austria on behalf of the Holy Roman Empire. On 9 December, Matthias's brother the Emperor Rudolf II ratified the treaty. The Ottomans' inability to penetrate further into Habsburg territory (Royal Hungary) during the Long Turkish War was one of their first geopolitical defeats. However, the treaty stabilized conditions on the Habsburg–Ottoman frontier for half a century for the benefit of both parties. The Habsburgs would face serious domestic opposition during the following years, and the Ottomans, apart from internal rebellion, had open conflicts in other parts of their frontiers (Poland and Iran).

At Zsitvatorok, for the first time, the Ottoman sultan, who carried the title Kayser-i Rûm (Caesar of the Roman Empire) since the Fall of Constantinople, recognised the equality of status of the Holy Roman Emperor by titling him Padishah (High King or, more literally, "Master King"), which was one of the sultan's own titles. That was interpreted by Christian Europe as an acceptance of divisio imperii in which imperial hegemony would be divided into West (the Holy Roman Empire) and East (the Ottoman Empire). Before then, the Holy Roman Emperor was regarded as mere kral (king) of Vienna in Ottoman diplomacy. The next European ruler to be conceded that level of respect was Catherine the Great of Russia in the Treaty of Küçük Kaynarca of 1774.
