= Žitava (river) =

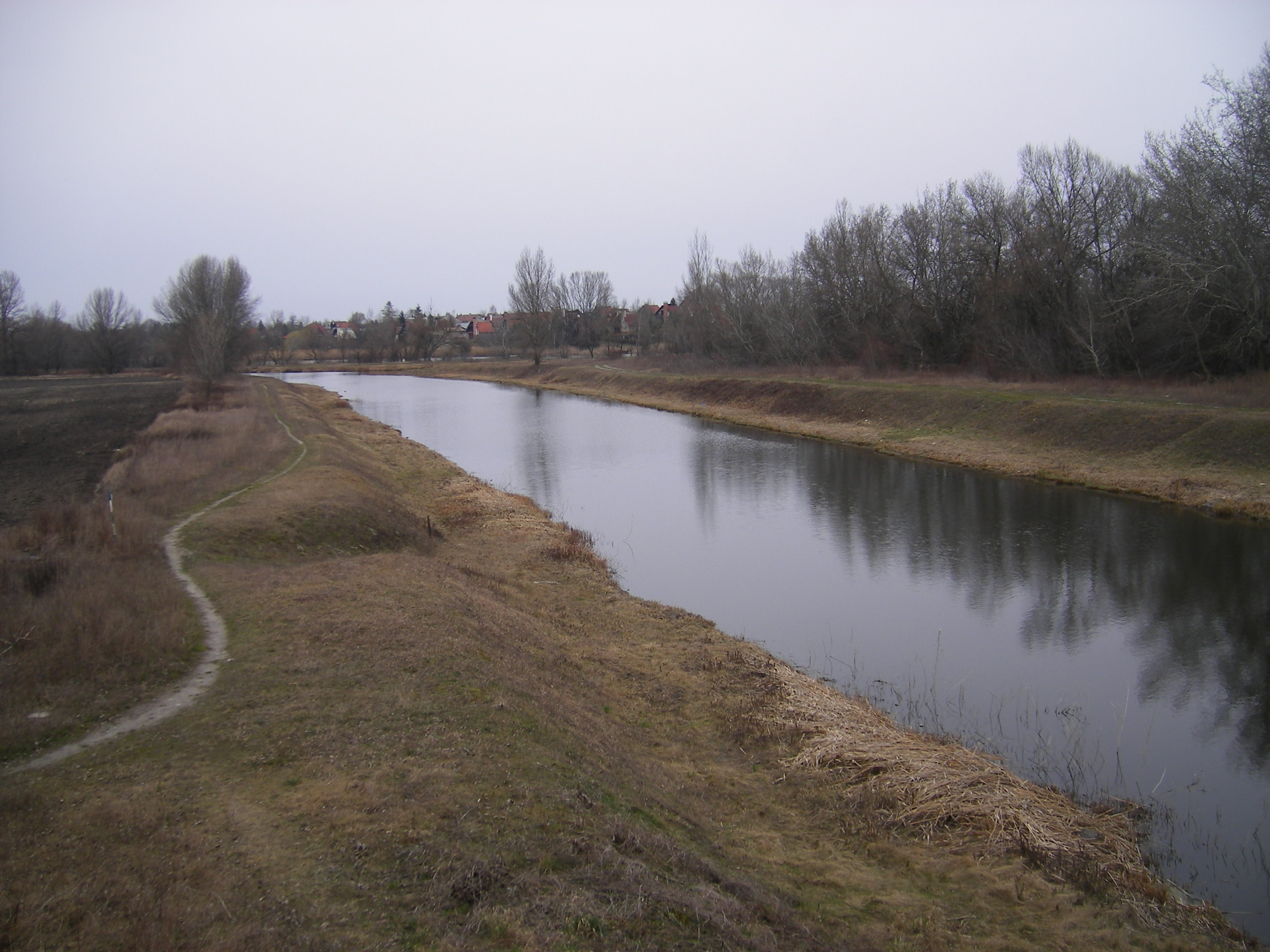
- The Žitava river near Radvaň nad Dunajom, near its former mouth to the Danube

Location
- Country: Slovakia

Physical characteristics
- Source
  - location: Pohronský Inovec
- Mouth: Nitra
  - location: Šurany
  - coordinates: 48.0860°N 18.2172°E
- Length: 65.6 km (40.8 mi)
- Basin size: 907 km^{2} (350 sq mi)
- Discharge
  - average: 5.05 m^{3}/s (178 cu ft/s)

Basin features
- Progression: Nitra→ Váh→ Danube→ Black Sea

The Žitava (Hungarian: Zsitva) is a river in southern Slovakia. It is the left tributary of the river Nitra. It flows into the Nitra near Šurany. It is 65.6 km (40.8 mi) long and its basin size is 907 km^{2} (350 sq mi). The old branch of the Žitava, Stará Žitava, branches off near Dolný Ohaj and flows into the old branch of the Nitra near Martovce.

== Etymology ==
The name comes from Slavic žito: grain, corn. Žitava: probably "the river flowing through the grain fields".

== See also ==
- Peace of Zsitvatorok (or Žitava)
