= Fodor's =

Publisher of travel guide books

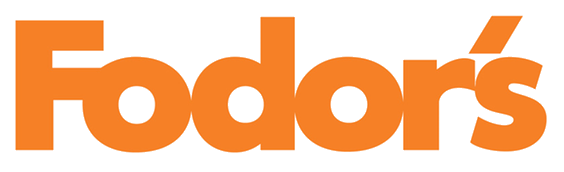
- Parent company: Internet Brands
- Founded: 1949
- Founder: Eugene Fodor
- Country of origin: United States
- Headquarters location: El Segundo, California
- Distribution: Ingram Publisher Services
- Publication types: Books
- Fiction genres: Travel guides
- Official website: fodors.com

Fodor's /ˈfoʊdərz/ is a producer of English-language travel guides and online tourism information. It was founded by Hungarian Eugene Fodor, who created his first travel guide, 1936...on the Continent, with the intention of improving upon the directory-type travel guides in existence through the inclusion of practical guidance, such as tipping advice, and levity (the introduction noted that "Rome contains not only magnificent monuments [...] but also Italians.").

Fodor's pioneering book was a success in England and the United States, and was immediately updated as 1937 in Europe. After an interruption caused by World War II, Fodor's Modern Guides, Inc., was founded in Paris in 1949, and a year later David McKay Company became its publisher. Fodor's was acquired with McKay by Random House in 1986 and sold to Internet Brands in 2016.

Fodor's has published more than 440 guides (in 14 series) on over 300 destinations, and has more than 700 permanently placed researchers all over the world. Its website, which was launched in 1996, was nominated for a Webby Award in 2004.
