= Martovce =

Village in Nitra, Slovakia

Martovce Martos
- Municipality
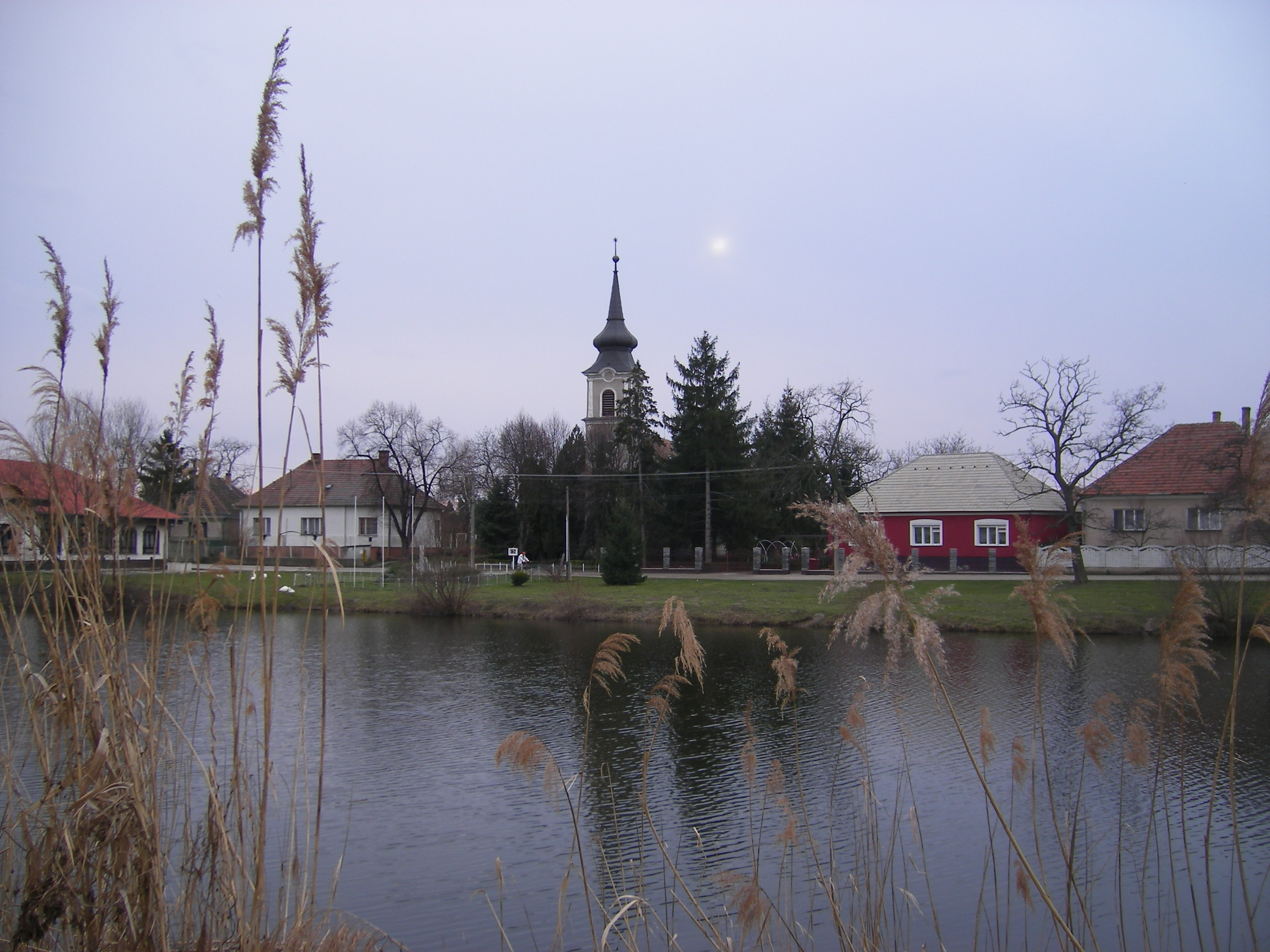
- Reformed church in the village

- Flag Coat of arms

- Location of Martovce in the Nitra Region Location of Martovce in Slovakia
- Coordinates: 47.85°N 18.13°E
- Country: Slovakia
- Region: Nitra Region
- District: Komárno District
- First mentioned: 1438

Government
  - Mayor: István Keszeg (SMK-MKP)

Area
  - Total: 19.96 km^{2} (7.71 sq mi)
- Elevation: 110 m (360 ft)

Population (2025)
  - Total: 682
- Time zone: UTC+1 (CET)
  - Summer (DST): UTC+2 (CEST)
- Postal code: 946 61
- Area code: +421 35
- Vehicle registration plate (until 2022): KN
- Website: www.martovce.sk

Martovce (Hungarian: Martos, Hungarian pronunciation:[ˈmɒrtoʃ]) is a village and municipality in the Komárno District in the Nitra Region of south-west Slovakia.

== Geography ==
The municipality lies at an altitude of 110 metres (360 ft) and covers an area of 19.96 km^{2} (7.71 sq mi) (2025).

== Population ==
Population statistic (10 years)
Year	1995	2005	2015	2025
Count	799	744	694	682
Difference		−6.88%	−6.72%	−1.72%

Population statistic
Year	2024	2025
Count	692	682
Difference		−1.44%

It has a population of 682 people (31 December 2025).

=== Ethnicity ===
Census 2021 (1+ %)
Ethnicity	Number	Fraction
Hungarian	591	85.15%
Slovak	108	15.56%
Not found out	32	4.61%
Romani	7	1%
Total	694	

In year 2021 was 694 people by ethnicity 591 as Hungarian, 108 as Slovak, 32 as Not found out, 7 as Romani, 2 as German, 1 as Czech and 1 as Other.

Note on population: The difference values of population numbers in the table "Population statistic" and in the sections "Ethnicity" & "Religion" is caused by the use of various statistical methods.

=== Religion ===
Census 2021 (1+ %)
Religion	Number	Fraction
Calvinist Church	337	48.56%
Roman Catholic Church	156	22.48%
None	144	20.75%
Not found out	25	3.6%
Evangelical Church	17	2.45%
Total	694	

In year 2021 was 694 people by religion 337 from Calvinist Church, 156 from Roman Catholic Church, 144 from None, 25 from Not found out, 17 from Evangelical Church, 5 from Jehovah's Witnesses, 2 from Old Catholic Church, 2 from Paganism and natural spirituality, 2 from Christian Congregations in Slovakia, 2 from Buddhism, 1 from Other and not ascertained christian church and 1 from Other.

== History ==
In the 9th century, the territory of Martovce became part of the Kingdom of Hungary. In historical records the village was first mentioned in 1438. After the Austro-Hungarian army disintegrated in November 1918, Czechoslovak troops occupied the area, later acknowledged internationally by the Treaty of Trianon. Between 1938 and 1945 Martovce once more became part of Miklós Horthy's Hungary through the First Vienna Award. From 1945 until the Velvet Divorce, it was part of Czechoslovakia. Since then it has been part of Slovakia.

== Facilities ==
The village has a public library, and a football pitch.
