= Milan Karvaš =

Slovak chemist (1932–2024)

- Born: 5 June 1932; Bratislava, Czechoslovakia
- Died: 2 August 2024 (aged 92); Bratislava, Slovakia
- Children: 2
- Relatives: Imrich Karvaš (father); Ľubica Karvašová (niece)

Academic background
- Education: Slovak University of Technology in Bratislava

Academic work
- Discipline: Chemistry

Milan Karvaš (5 June 1932 – 2 August 2024) was a Slovak chemist.

== Biography ==
Milan Karvaš was born on 5 June 1932 in Bratislava. His father was the economist Imrich Karvaš. During the World War II, his father served as the governor of the National Bank of Slovakia and used his position to fund the Slovak National Uprising. Knowing that the regime will punish him for this, Imrich Karvaš moved his family, including young Milan, to Bojnice, although he was not able to escape in time to avoid his own arrest by the gestapo.

Due to the political background of his father, Karvaš was unable to pursue university studies and had to support himself with manual labor while repeatedly applying to various programs. In 1957 he was able to graduate from the Slovak University of Technology in Bratislava with an engineer degree in chemistry. After graduation he worked at the Slovak Academy of Sciences until 1960, when he was again dismissed due to his family background and had to support his family through once again working as a laborer at a chemical plant in Bratislava.

Karvaš benefited from the political liberalization during the Prague Spring and was able to move from laborer to engineer position at the plant, defend his candidature at the Slovak Academy of Sciences and travel abroad for a research stay at ETH Zurich. After his return, he worked as a lead scientist in a chemical technology research institute in Bratislava. Following the Velvet Revolution, he was appointed a lecturer of industrial chemistry at the Comenius University, where he taught until retirement in 2000. In 1991, he co-founded first private chemical laboratory in Slovakia.

Karvaš was a lifelong member of Rotary club in Czechoslovakia. In 2001, he published a biography of his father called Môj otec Imrich Karvaš (My father Imrich Karvaš).

== Death ==
Milan Karvaš died on 2 August 2024 at the age of 92.
