= Ľubica Karvašová =

Slovak politician (born 1987)

Ľubica Karvašová MEP
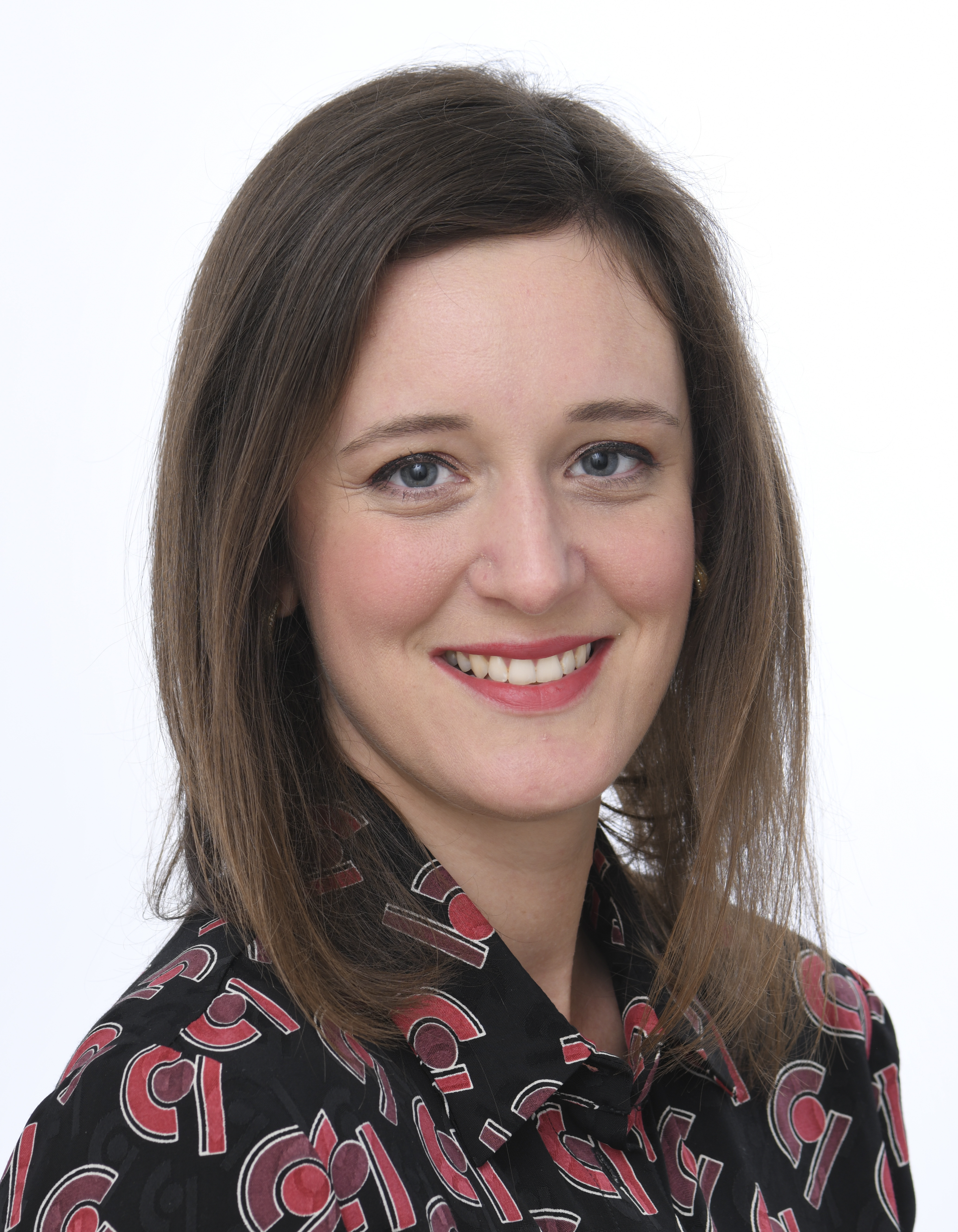
- Ľubica Karvašová in 2024

Member of the European Parliament for Slovakia
- Incumbent
- Assumed office 16 July 2024

Personal details
- Born: 1987 (age 38–39) Czechoslovakia
- Party: Progressive Slovakia
- Other political affiliations: Alliance of Liberals and Democrats for Europe Party
- Relatives: Imrich Karvaš (grandfather); Milan Karvaš (uncle)
- Education: University of Economics in Bratislava; Sorbonne University

Ľubica Karvašová (born 1987) is a Slovak politician of Progressive Slovakia who was elected member of the European Parliament in 2024. She previously served as European affairs advisor to prime ministers Igor Matovič, Eduard Heger and Ľudovít Ódor.

Karvašová studied International Relations at the University of Economics in Bratislava and at Sorbonne.

Karvašová is a granddaughter of Imrich Karvaš, the first governor of the National Bank of Slovakia.
