= Bešeňov =

Village and municipality in Slovakia

Bešeňov Zsitvabesenyő
- Municipality
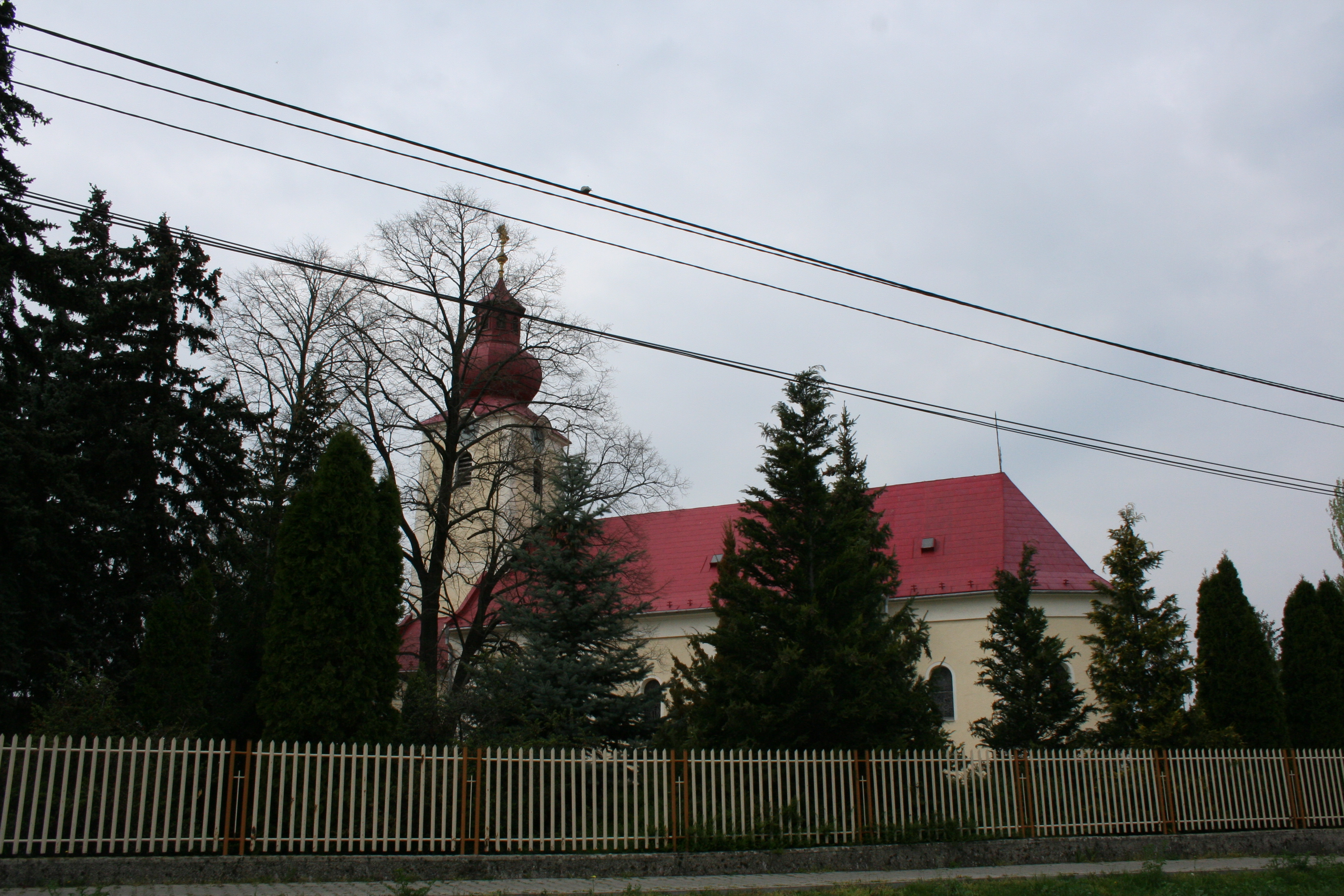

- Flag

- Location of Bešeňov in the Nitra Region Location of Bešeňov in Slovakia
- Coordinates: 48.05°N 18.27°E
- Country: Slovakia
- Region: Nitra Region
- District: Nové Zámky District
- First mentioned: 1075

Area
  - Total: 17.09 km^{2} (6.60 sq mi)
- Elevation: 123 m (404 ft)

Population (2025)
  - Total: 1,532
- Time zone: UTC+1 (CET)
  - Summer (DST): UTC+2 (CEST)
- Postal code: 941 41
- Area code: +421 35
- Vehicle registration plate (until 2022): NZ
- Website: www.besenov.sk

Bešeňov (Hungarian: Zsitvabesenyő) is a municipality and village in the Nové Zámky District in the Nitra Region of south-west Slovakia.

== History ==
In the 9th century, the territory of Bešeňov became part of the Kingdom of Hungary. In historical records the village was first mentioned in 1075. After the Austro-Hungarian army disintegrated in November 1918, Czechoslovak troops occupied the area, later acknowledged internationally by the Treaty of Trianon. Between 1938 and 1945 Bešeňov once more became part of Miklós Horthy's Hungary through the First Vienna Award. From 1945 until the Velvet Divorce, it was part of Czechoslovakia. Since then it has been part of Slovakia.

== Geography ==
The municipality lies at an altitude of 123 metres (404 ft) and covers an area of 17.09 km^{2} (6.60 sq mi) (2025).

== Population ==
Population statistic (10 years)
Year	1995	2005	2015	2025
Count	1799	1711	1631	1532
Difference		−4.89%	−4.67%	−6.06%

Population statistic
Year	2024	2025
Count	1551	1532
Difference		−1.22%

It has a population of 1532 people (31 December 2025).

=== Ethnicity ===
Census 2021 (1+ %)
Ethnicity	Number	Fraction
Hungarian	1164	71.8%
Slovak	539	33.25%
Not found out	25	1.54%
Total	1621	

In year 2021 was 1621 people by ethnicity 1164 as Hungarian, 539 as Slovak, 25 as Not found out, 7 as Other, 3 as Czech, 3 as Russian, 1 as Turkish, 1 as Serbian, 1 as Romani, 1 as Austrian and 1 as German.

Note on population: The difference values of population numbers in the table "Population statistic" and in the sections "Ethnicity" & "Religion" is caused by the use of various statistical methods.

=== Religion ===
Census 2021 (1+ %)
Religion	Number	Fraction
Roman Catholic Church	1461	90.13%
None	83	5.12%
Calvinist Church	19	1.17%
Evangelical Church	18	1.11%
Not found out	17	1.05%
Total	1621	

In year 2021 was 1621 people by religion 1461 from Roman Catholic Church, 83 from None, 19 from Calvinist Church, 18 from Evangelical Church, 17 from Not found out, 10 from Greek Catholic Church, 4 from Other, 2 from Paganism and natural spirituality, 2 from Christian Congregations in Slovakia, 1 from Eastern Orthodox Church, 1 from Other and not ascertained christian church, 1 from Islam, 1 from United Methodist Church and 1 from Apostolic Church.

== Facilities ==
The village has a public library, gym, football team and table-tennis team. It has three pubs and two bars. A small medical centre is also run by the village.

== Genealogical resources ==
The records for genealogical research are available at the state archive "Statny Archiv in Nitra, Slovakia"

- Roman Catholic church records (births/marriages/deaths): 1787-1925 (parish A)
- Reformated church records (births/marriages/deaths): 1784-1870 (parish B)

== See also ==
- List of municipalities and towns in Slovakia
