= Radvaň nad Dunajom =

Radvaň nad Dunajom Dunaradvány
- Municipality
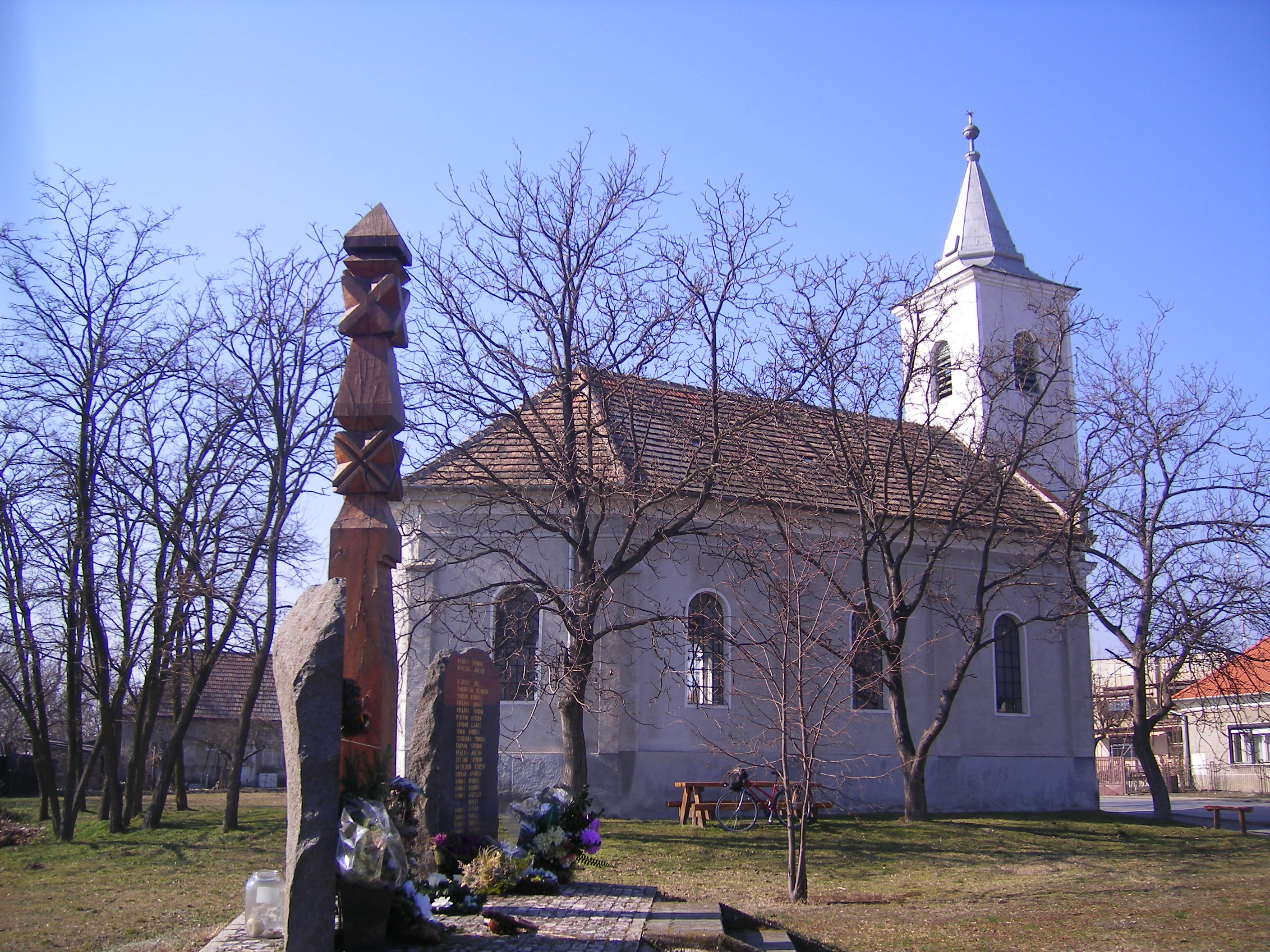
- Reformated church

- Flag Coat of arms

- Location of Pribeta in the Nitra Region Location of Pribeta in Slovakia
- Coordinates: 47.75°N 18.37°E
- Country: Slovakia
- Region: Nitra Region
- District: Komárno District
- First mentioned: 1260

Area
  - Total: 15.75 km^{2} (6.08 sq mi)
- Elevation: 111 m (364 ft)

Population (2025)
  - Total: 702
- Time zone: UTC+1 (CET)
  - Summer (DST): UTC+2 (CEST)
- Postal code: 946 38
- Area code: +421 35
- Vehicle registration plate (until 2022): KN
- Website: www.radvannaddunajom.sk

Radvaň nad Dunajom (Hungarian: Dunaradvány, pronounced [ˈdunɒrɒdvaːɲ]) is a municipality at the Danube in the Komárno District of the Nitra Region in Slovakia.

== Geography ==
The municipality lies at an altitude of 111 metres (364 ft) and covers an area of 15.75 km^{2} (6.08 sq mi) (2025).

== Etymology ==
The name is derived from the Slavic personal name Radovan.

== History ==
In the 9th century, the territory of Radvaň nad Dunajom became part of the Kingdom of Hungary. It was first mentioned as a village in 1260. The 1606 Peace of Zsitvatorok was signed in Žitavská Tôň, a small settlement near or identical with Žitava, which is now part of Radvaň nad Dunajom. After the Austro-Hungarian army disintegrated in November 1918, Czechoslovak troops occupied the area, later acknowledged internationally by the Treaty of Trianon. Between 1938 and 1945 Radvaň nad Dunajom once more became part of Miklós Horthy's Hungary through the First Vienna Award. From 1945 until the Velvet Divorce, it was part of Czechoslovakia. Since then it has been part of Slovakia.

== Population ==
Population statistic (10 years)
Year	1995	2005	2015	2025
Count	739	744	703	702
Difference		+0.67%	−5.51%	−0.14%

Population statistic
Year	2024	2025
Count	710	702
Difference		−1.12%

It has a population of 702 people (31 December 2025).

=== Ethnicity ===
Census 2021 (1+ %)
Ethnicity	Number	Fraction
Hungarian	634	89.17%
Slovak	106	14.9%
Not found out	30	4.21%
Total	711	

In year 2021 was 711 people by ethnicity 634 as Hungarian, 106 as Slovak, 30 as Not found out, 6 as Other, 2 as German and 1 as Russian.

Note on population: The difference values of population numbers in the table "Population statistic" and in the sections "Ethnicity" & "Religion" is caused by the use of various statistical methods.

=== Religion ===
Census 2021 (1+ %)
Religion	Number	Fraction
Roman Catholic Church	322	45.29%
Calvinist Church	238	33.47%
None	121	17.02%
Not found out	10	1.41%
Evangelical Church	10	1.41%
Total	711	

In year 2021 was 711 people by religion 322 from Roman Catholic Church, 238 from Calvinist Church, 121 from None, 10 from Not found out, 10 from Evangelical Church, 7 from Greek Catholic Church, 2 from Other and 1 from Other and not ascertained christian church.

According to the census of 2001, the municipality has 91.46% Hungarian majority and 7.99% Slovak minority.
