= Battle of Nagysalló =

Battle during Hungarian Revolution of 1848

Coordinates: 48°05′24.2″N 18°32′39.2″E

- Part of the Hungarian Revolution of 1848
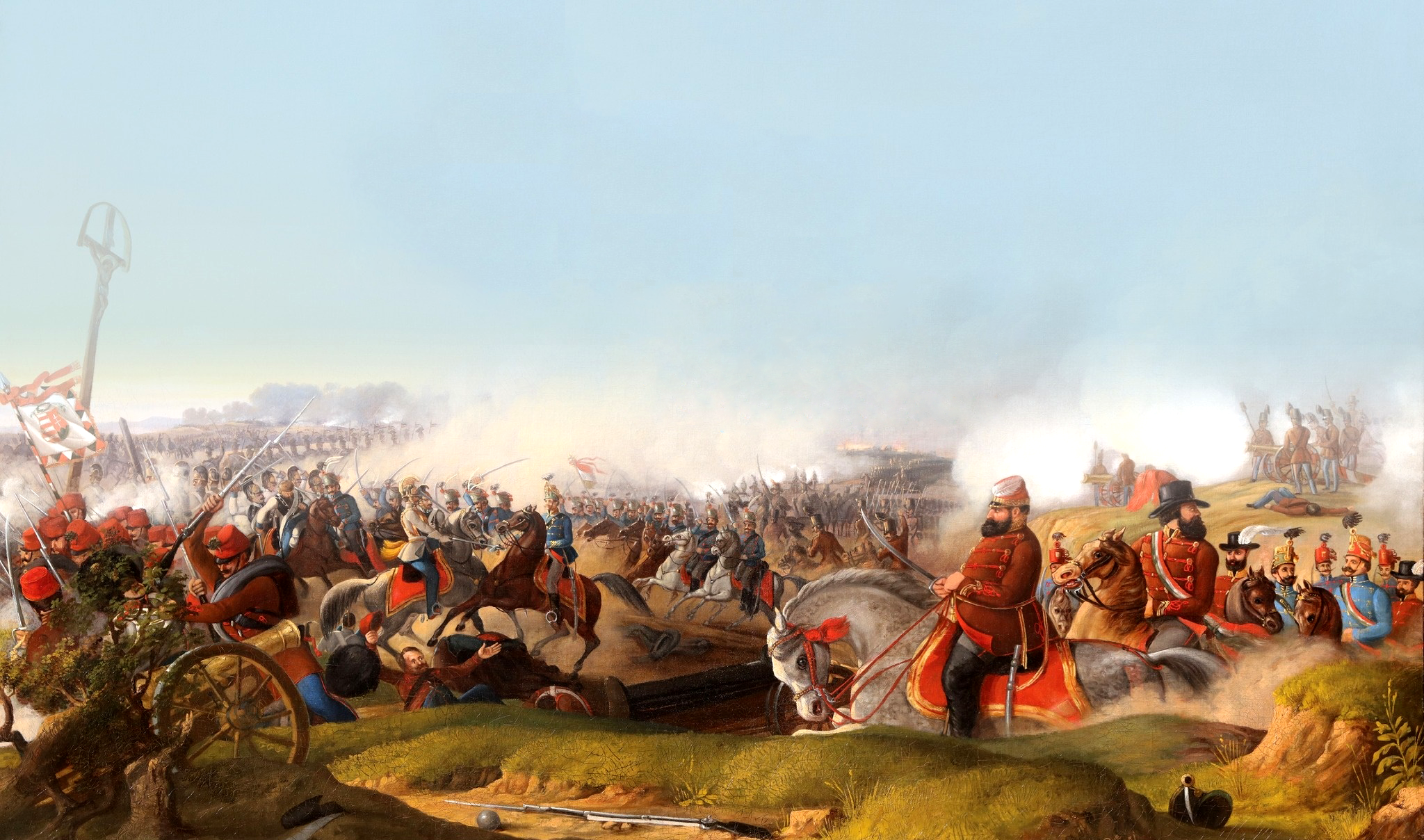
- Battle of Nagysallo, unknown artist
Date	19 April 1849
Location	around and in Nagysalló and Nagymálas, Kingdom of Hungary (now Tekovské Lužany and Málaš, Slovakia)
Result	Hungarian victory

Belligerents
Hungarian Revolutionary Army; Polish Legion	Austrian Empire

Commanders and leaders
János Damjanich; György Klapka; András Gáspár	Ludwig von Wohlgemuth

Strength
23,784 – I. corps: 9,465 – III. corps: 9,419 – VII. corps: 4,900; 87 cannons	20,601; 55 cannons

Casualties and losses
608	Total: 1,538; 112 dead 189 wounded 1,237 missing and captured

The Battle of Nagysalló, fought on 19 April 1849, was one of the battles between the Habsburg Empire and the Hungarian Revolutionary Army during the Spring Campaign in the Hungarian War of Independence from 1848 to 1849, fought between the Habsburg Empire and the Hungarian Revolutionary Army. Until 1918 Nagysalló was part of the Kingdom of Hungary; nowadays it is a village in Slovakia, its Slovakian name being Tekovské Lužany. This was the second battle in the second phase of the campaign, whose aim was to break the imperial siege of the fortress of Komárom and at the same time encircle the Habsburg imperial forces headquartered in the Hungarian capitals of Buda and Pest. The Hungarians routed the imperial corps led by Lieutenant General Ludwig von Wohlgemuth, which had come from the Habsburg Hereditary Lands (Vienna, Styria, Bohemia, Moravia), to help the imperial army sent to suppress the Hungarian Revolution of 1848 and independence.

== Background ==
After the Battle of Vác the Hungarian army continued its advance in accordance with the plan for the second phase of the Spring Campaign as developed on 7 April. According to this plan the Hungarian army was to split: General Lajos Aulich with the Hungarian II Corps, and Colonel Lajos Asbóth's division remained demonstrating in front of Pest to make the imperials believe the whole Hungarian army was there; this would divert the Imperials' attention from the north, where the real Hungarian attack was to start with I, III and VII Corps moving west along the northern bank of the Danube via Komárom, to relieve it from the imperial siege. Kmety's division of VII Corps was to cover the three corps' march. After I and III corps had occupied Vác, Kmety was then to secure the town while they and the two remaining divisions of VII Corps were to advance to the Garam river, then head south to relieve the northern section of the Austrian siege of the fortress of Komárom. After this, they were to cross the Danube and relieve the southern section of the siege. In the event that all of this was successfully completed, the imperials had only two choices: to retreat from Middle Hungary towards Vienna, or to face encirclement in Pest and Buda by the Hungarians. This plan was very risky (as was the first phase of the Spring Campaign too) because if Windisch-Grätz discovered that there was only one Hungarian corps left in front of Pest, he could attack and destroy Aulich's troops, thus easily cutting the main Hungarian army's lines of communication, and even occupy Debrecen, the seat of the Hungarian Revolutionary Parliament and the National Defense Committee (the interim government of Hungary), or alternatively he could encircle the three corps advancing to relieve Komárom.

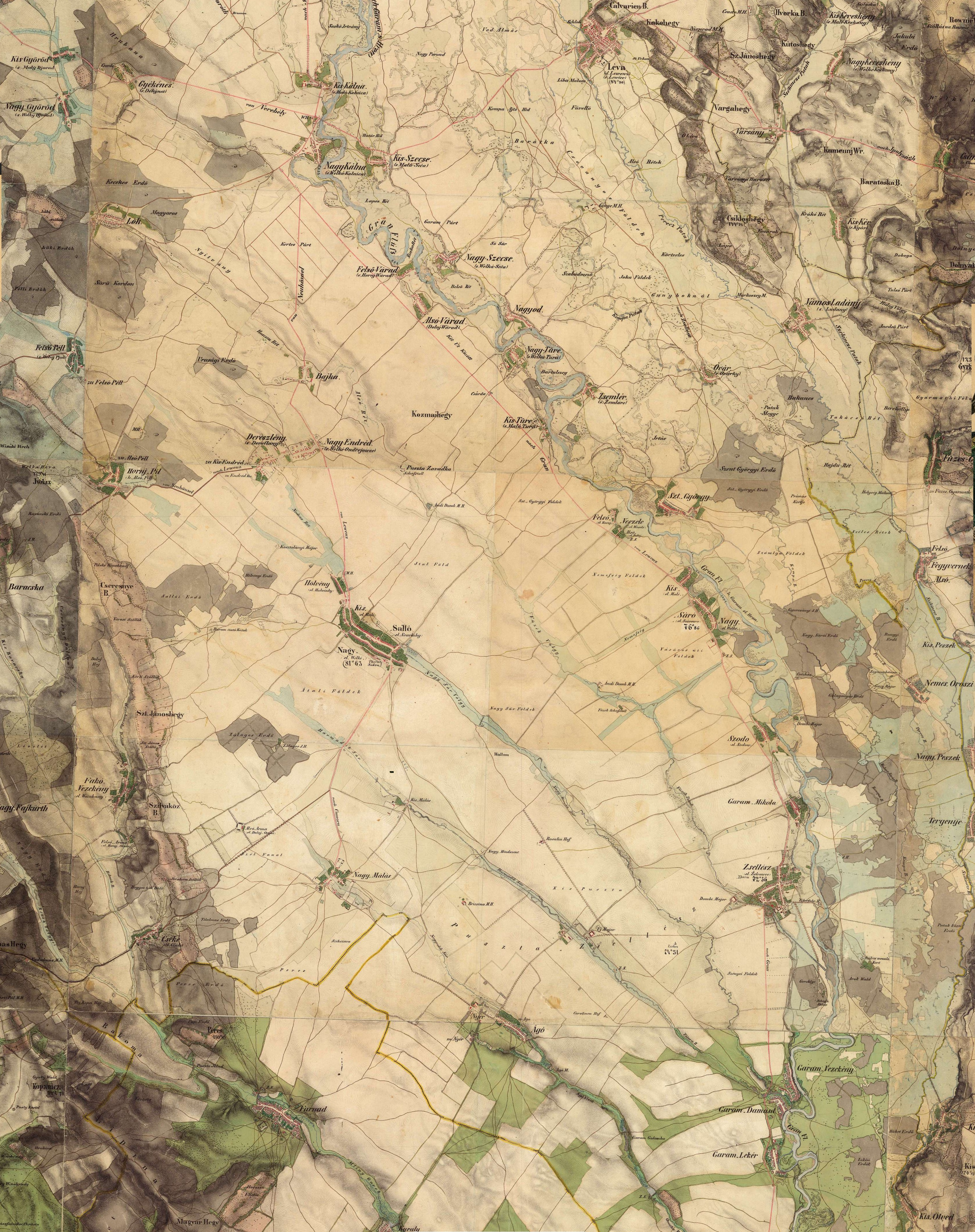
The region in which the Battle of Nagysalló took place in a map from the middle of the 19th century

Although the president of the National Defense Committee (interim government of Hungary), Lajos Kossuth, who went to the Hungarian headquarters at Gödöllő after the battle of Isaszeg, wanted a direct attack on Pest, he was finally convinced by the Hungarian commander-in-chief, Artúr Görgei that his and the other generals' plan was better. To help to ensure the Hungarian army's success, the National Defense Committee sent 100 wagonloads of munitions from Debrecen. In the Battle of Vác on 10 April the Hungarian III Corps under General János Damjanich defeated Ramberg's division led by Major General Christian Götz, who was mortally wounded. Even after this battle, the imperial high command under Field Marshal Alfred I, Prince of Windisch-Grätz was unsure whether the main Hungarian army was in front of Pest or had already moved north to relieve Komárom. They still believed it was possible that only a secondary force had attacked Vác and moved towards the besieged Hungarian fortress. When Windisch-Grätz finally seemed to grasp what was really happening, he wanted to make a powerful attack against the Hungarians outside Pest on 14 April, then to cross the Danube at Esztergom and cut off the force which was marching towards Komárom. However, his corps commanders, General Franz Schlik and lieutenant field marshal Josip Jelačić refused to obey his orders, so his plan which could have caused serious problems for the Hungarian armies was never realized.

Meanwhile, the Austrian high commandment from Vienna understood that the Austrian army was incapable to stop the Hungarians, so they decided to send more troops from the Austrian Hereditary Provinces to Hungary. First, they assembled from the available imperial troops from Vienna, Styria, Bohemia, and Moravia three brigades (the Herzinger, Teuchert, and Theissing brigades), added to them the Perin and the Veigl (formerly Lobkowitz) brigades, detached from the Balthasar von Simunich's siege corps of Komárom, and the Jablonowski (former Ramberg) division which fought in the Battle of Vác from 10 April, and organized them in a new corps, called the Reserve Corps, and put it under the leadership of Lieutenant General Ludwig von Wohlgemuth, who distinguished himself earlier on the Italian front. Wohlhemuth received the order to stop the Hungarian army's westward advance to Komárom. Other Austrian troops too were sent to Hungary. The so-called Galician corps, under the leadership of Lieutenant General Anton Vogel, and consisting of 11 infantry battalions, 8 cavalry companies, and 24 cannons, was sent on 8 April from Galicia in Northern Hungary, in order to stop the Hungarian troops' advance there.

The numerical reinforcement of the Austrian troops was seen by Vienna as not enough to remediate the deteriorating situation in Hungary, so they decided to change also the leader of the army. Windisch-Grätz, because of his series of defeats against the Hungarian troops, lost the trust of the Austrian high commandment, and on 12 April he was relieved of his command by Emperor Franz Joseph I of Austria. He was replaced by Feldzeugmeister Ludwig von Welden, the former military governor of Vienna, but until Welden arrived, Windisch-Grätz had to hand over to Lieutenant Field Marshal Josip Jelačić as interim commander-in-chief of the imperial armies in Hungary. But this change at the head of the imperial forces brought neither lucidity nor organization to the imperial high command, because the first thing Jelačić did at the start of his appointment was to call off Windisch-Grätz's plan of concentrating the imperial armies around Esztergom, without giving this not unpromising plan a chance.

Görgey, who had installed his headquarters at Vác after the battle from 10 April, ordered Damjanich's III Corps to advance towards Léva on 11 April and Klapka's I Corps to do so on the 12th. Their place in Vác was taken by VII Corps under András Gáspár, then after that followed them, Vác was occupied by Kmety's division.

== Prelude ==
Wohlgemuth and his three brigades neared the Vág and Garam rivers, being joined by a brigade from Lieutenant General Balthasar Simunich's division and the Jablonowski division defeated at Vác some days earlier. Welden was sure, that this Austrian army corps, now containing around 20 000 men, would stop the Hungarian advancement. Welden and Wohlgemuth met in Pozsony on 16 April, in which the new high commander ordered the latter to defend the roads leading from Léva to Komárom, instead of taking an offensive stance and attack them when they tried to cross the Garam river. On 17 April Welden ordered Jelačić to march towards Vác and link up with Wohlgemuth, but the Croatian ban was reluctant to obey, only agreeing to move on 20 April (a day after the battle of Nagysalló actually took place).

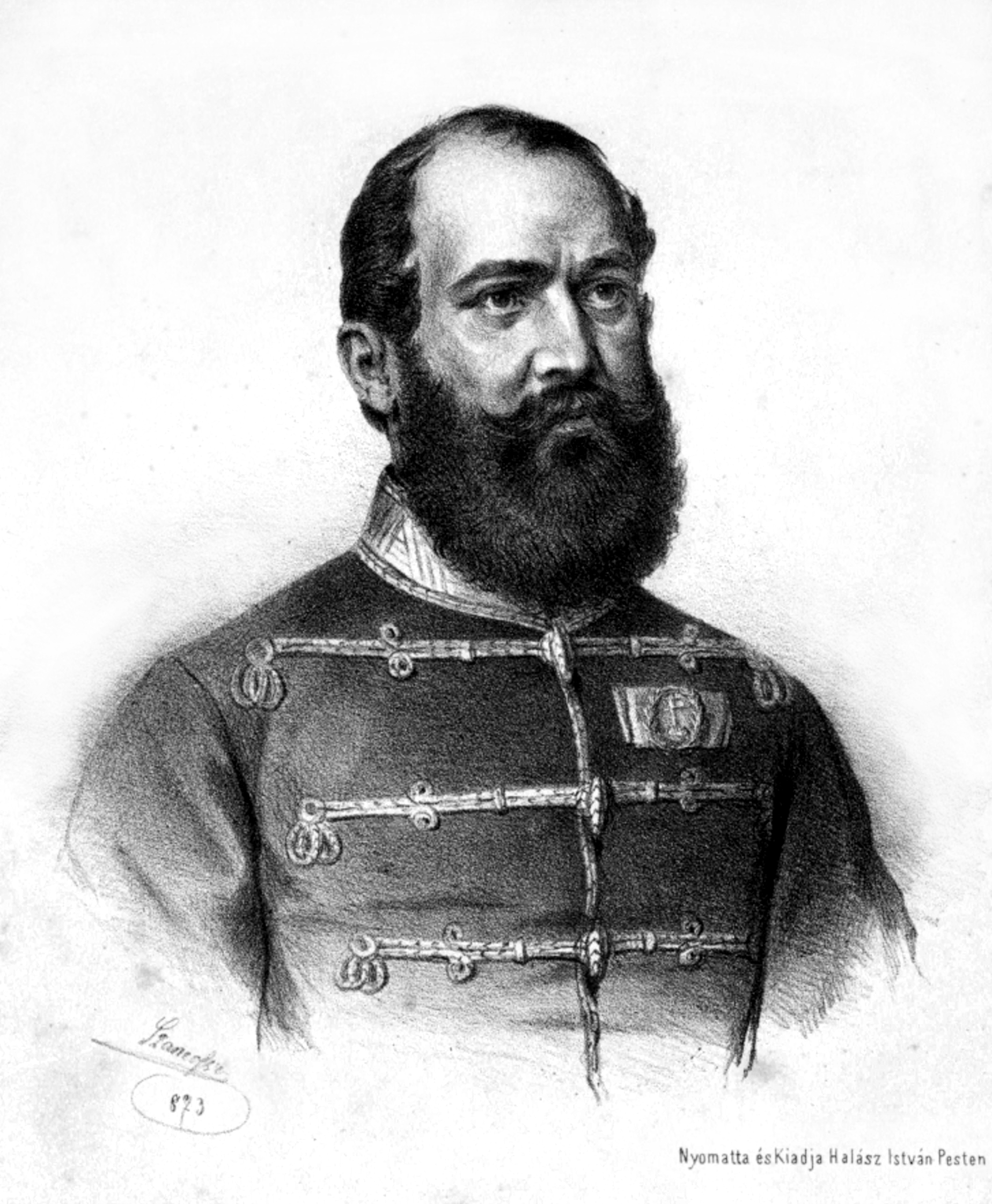
Damjanich János

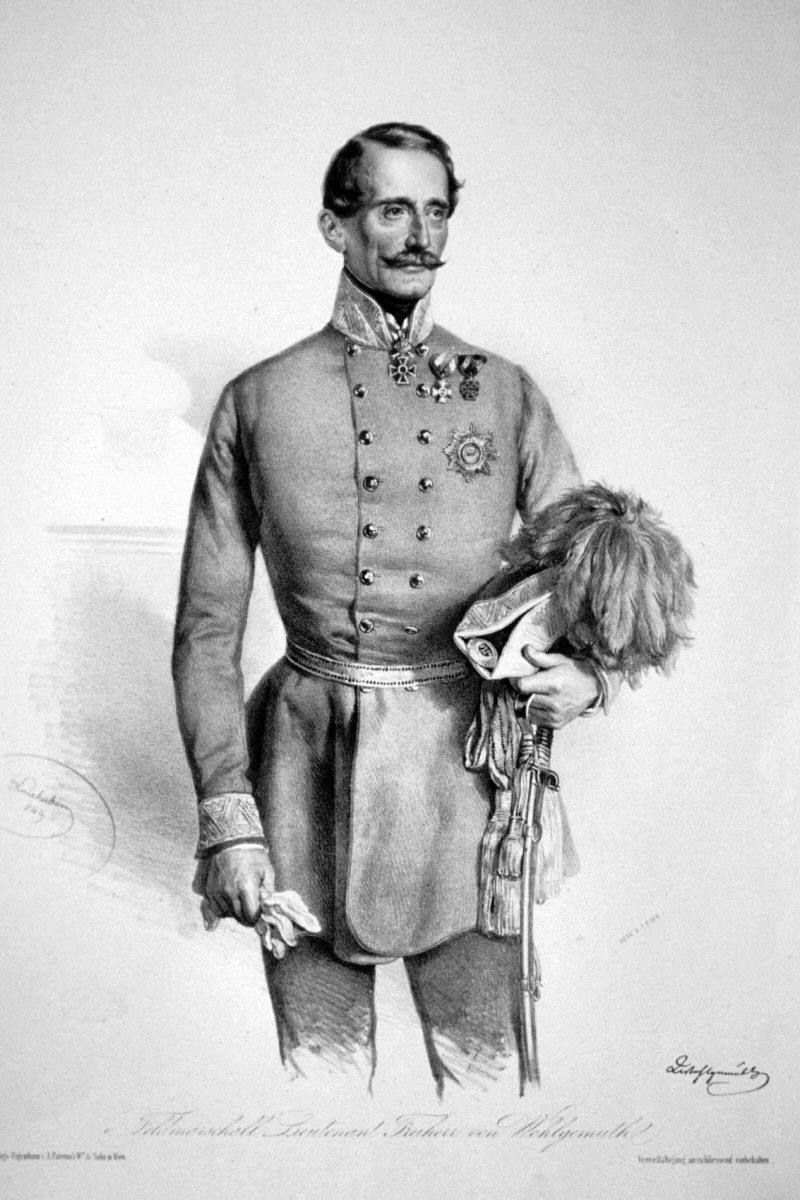
Ludwig von Wohlgemuth

Meanwhile, on 15–17 April the Hungarian army consisting of I and III Corps and two divisions of VII Corps arrived at the Garam, under Görgei's overall command. He sent a detachment of 2,300 soldiers and 10 guns north under the command of his older brother Ármin Görgei to occupy the so-called Mining Towns (including Selmecbánya, Körmöcbánya, Besztercebánya), and to cover against an attack from the north. Görgei also ordered the three corps to build bridges across the Garam in three separate places. Because I Corps's bridge was finished quickly, while work on the other two was progressing very slowly, on the 18th Görgei ordered that III Corps should also cross on the I Corps bridge at Nagykálna, leaving only VII Corps on the east bank trying to finish its bridge at Zsemlér. Then I and III Corps advanced southwest. The I. corps marched to Garamlök and Alsópél, the III. corps to Derezslény, sending a detachment to Veszele, to cover the VII. corps' bridge-building at Zsemlér. On the same day (Note: According to Bánlaky on 19 April.) the Dessewffy's division from the right wing of the Hungarian army, was sent, through Alsópél, to Nagysalló, with the order to wait there for the bulk of the army which had to advance towards Jászfalu; while 2 divisions of the VII. had to reach Zselíz on 19 April, a hussar detachment being sent, through Verebély, to raid towards Nyitra. Görgei installed the headquarters at Léva, and there will he remain during the battle of Nagysalló, without directly intervening in the military actions.

Wolgemuth's Austrians were positioned as follows: Veigl's brigade at Bese, Herzinger's at Cseke, Strastil's and Dreyhann's brigades of Jablonowski's division together with Theissing's brigade at Nagymálas, and Perin's at Köbölkút. In a letter to the high command written at midnight on 16 April he reported the Hungarians' strength as 24,000 men with 48 guns, among them a 12-pounder battery, and that their purpose was to advance towards Komárom. This shows that his reconnaissance had been quite good, giving him fairly accurate knowledge of their strength and intentions. In the same letter he wrote that he hoped they would be slow to cross the river, as he wanted to confront them before they reached Nyitra. Welden replied that he should attack the Hungarians, thinking that this would boost the imperial soldiers' morale and demoralize the Hungarians. Welden had also heard about the possibility of intervention by the Russian Empire on behalf of the Habsburg Empire to crush the Hungarian War of Independence, and that some of the czar's troops had already entered the Habsburg province of Galicia, in case the Austrian situation became hopeless. But Welden did not want the Austrians to suffer the shame that they could only defeat the Hungarians with Russian help: What we can achieve with our own power is more than the brightest result which we can achieve with foreign help. This was also one of the reasons he was urging Wohlgemuth to do battle with the Hungarians.

Despite having good information about the Hungarians number, Wohlgemuth did not know enough about the progress of the bridge-building and their intentions, he knew that the Hungarians haven't finished yet the bridge, and thought that it will require some time until the bulk will finish the crossing of the Garam, and their units from the right bank and around NAgysalló are only minor foraging detachments. In this belief gave Wohlgemuth the order on 19 April at 5:30 a.m to the Strasdil brigade to occupy Nagysalló.

=== Opposing forces ===
The Austrian army

Reserve Corps

- Herzinger brigade: 3. battalion of the Baugartner regiment, 1. Landwehr battalion of the Khewenhüller regiment, 4. Ogulin battalion, 2 companies of the Wrbna chevau-léger regiment, the 18. six-pounder battery;
- Teuchert brigade: 1. battalion of the Mazzuchelli regiment, 2. battalion of the Mazzuchelli regiment, 1 battalion of the Hora grenadiers, 2 companies of Emperor Ferdinand cuirassier regiment, the 20. six-pounder battery;
- Theissing brigade: 4. Otočac battalion, 1. Landwehr battalion of the Archduke Stefan regiment, 2. battalion of Archduke Ferdinand d'Este regiment, 2 companies of the Civalart uhlan regiment, the 19. six-pounder battery;

Jablonowski (formerly Ramberg) division:

- Strasdil (formerly Götz) infantry brigade: 3. battalion of the 63. Bianchi infantry regiment, 1. battalion of the 36. Palombini infantry regiment, 12. kaiserjäger battalion, 2 1/2 companies of the 3. Archduke Karl Ludwig uhlan regiment, 1/2 cavalry battery, 1 1/2 Congreve rocket battery, 1 twelve-pounder infantry battery;
- Dreyhann (formerly Jablonowski) infantry brigade: 1. battalion of the 15. Adolf Duke of Nassau infantry regiment, 2 battalion of the 15. Adolf Duke of Nassau infantry regiment, 3. battalion of the 15. Adolf Duke of Nassau infantry regiment, 4. (Landwehr) battalion of the 15. Adolf Duke of Nassau infantry regiment, 2 companies of the 6. Wrbna chevau-léger regiment, 2 companies of the 1. Archduke John dragoon regiment, 1 company of the 7. Kress chevau-léger regiment, 1 sapper company, 1 six-pounder battery, 1 1/2 Congreve rocket battery, 1 twelve-pounder infantry battery. (Note: Structure of the Ramberg division in the First Battle of Vác from 10 April.)

In total: 115 infantry companies, 15 cavalry companies, 58 cannons and Congreve rockets. (Note: The Veigl and Perin brigades which were not included here, because they were far away from the battlefield, and they were not involved in any way in the battle.)

The Hungarian army

I. Corps

1. Dessewffy division:

- Dipold infantry brigade: 6. Honvéd battalion, 26. Honvéd battalion, 52. Honvéd battalion, 6. six-pounder cavalry battery;
- Bobich brigade: 28. Honvéd battalion, 44. Honvéd battalion, 47. Honvéd battalion, 1. six-pounder infantry battery;

2. Kazinczy division:

- Bátori-Sulcz infantry brigade: 17. Honvéd battalion, 3. battalion of the 39. infantry regiment, 2 sapper companies, 1/2 twelve-pounder battery;
- Zákó brigade: 19. Honvéd battalion, 34. Honvéd battalion;
- Artillery: 1 twelve-pounder battery, 4. six-pounder infantry battery;
- Nagysándor cavalry brigade: 4 companies of the 8. (Coburg) hussar regiment, 8 companies of the 1. (Imperial) hussar regiment, 2 companies of the 13. (Hunyadi) hussar regiment, 2 companies of the 14. (Lehel) hussar regiment. (Note: Structure of the I. corps in the First Battle of Komárom from 26 April.)

- III. corps:

1. Knezich division:

- Kiss infantry brigade: 1. battalion of the 34. infantry regiment, 3. battalion of the 34. infantry regiment, 3. battalion of the 52. infantry regiment;
- Kökényessy infantry brigade: 9. Honvéd battalion, 65. Honvéd battalion, 1/2 infantry battery, 1/2 jäger battalion, 1/2 sapper battalion with 1 military bridge set;
- Pikéty column: 2. hussar regiment (8 companies).

2. Wysocki division:

- Czillich infantry brigade: 3. battalion of the 60. infantry regiment, 42. Honvéd battalion, Polish Legion;
- Leiningen infantry brigade: 3. battalion of the 19. infantry regiment, 3. Honvéd battalion;
- Kászonyi cavalry brigade: 3. hussar regiment (6 companies), 2 Polish uhlan companies;
- Artillery of the corps: 3 six-pounder batteries, 1 twelve-pounder battery. (Note: Structure of the III. corps in the First Battle of Vác from 10 April.)

- VII. corps:

Poeltenberg division:

- Pósta infantry brigade: 1. Honvéd battalion, 51. Honvéd battalion, 1 sapper company, 2 companies of the 4. (Alexander) hussar regiment, 5. six pounder infantry battery;
- Zámbelly brigade: 14. Honvéd battalion, 1. Honvéd battalion from Pest, 1 sapper company, 6 companies of the 4. (Alexander) hussar regiment, 1. six pounder cavalry battery;
- Liptay brigade: 4 companies of the Tyrolian jägers, 3 companies of the 3. battalion of the 48. (Ernest) infantry regiment;
- Weissl column: 52 Honvéd battalion, grenadier battalion, 1 sapper company, 1 howitzer cavalry battery, 1 howitzer battery, 1 Congreve rocket battery, artillery reserve. (Note: Structure of the units of the VII. corps which participated in the Battle of Nagysalló from 22–25 April.)

In total: 151 infantry companies, 47 cavalry companies, and 87 cannons.

== Battle ==
At dawn on 19 April, Wohlgemuth ordered Strasdil's brigade to attack Nagysalló, Kissalló and Hölvény (two villages around it, which became years later parts of Nagysalló), which they accomplished, chasing Klapka's vanguard out of from there. Klapka, when he heard the gunshots, immediately rushed to Hölvény, where after reorganizing these units, and bringing the rest of his corps northwest from Nagysalló, he decided to retake the place and also informed Damjanich and Gáspár about the start of the battle. Hearing about the situation Damjanich immediately sent the Wysocki division to help Klapka's counter-attack. When the Wysocki division arrived, at 9 a.m. Klapka ordered the counter-attack as follows: the Dipold brigade of the Dessewffy division had to advance, through the Hölvény woods, to the Zálogos forest southeast from Nagysalló, the Kazinczy division had to push on the carriageway towards the northern entrance of the village, on their left the Wysocki division had to attack Nagysalló from the northeast, while General József Nagysándor with the bulk of the cavalry, formed of 6 cavalry companies of the I. corps and the cavalry of the III. corps, had to secure their left. As reserve remained the Bobich brigade of the Dessewffy division at the Hölvény forest, holding also the heights north of Fakóvezekény, and the Knezich division of the III. corps took position north of Hölvény.

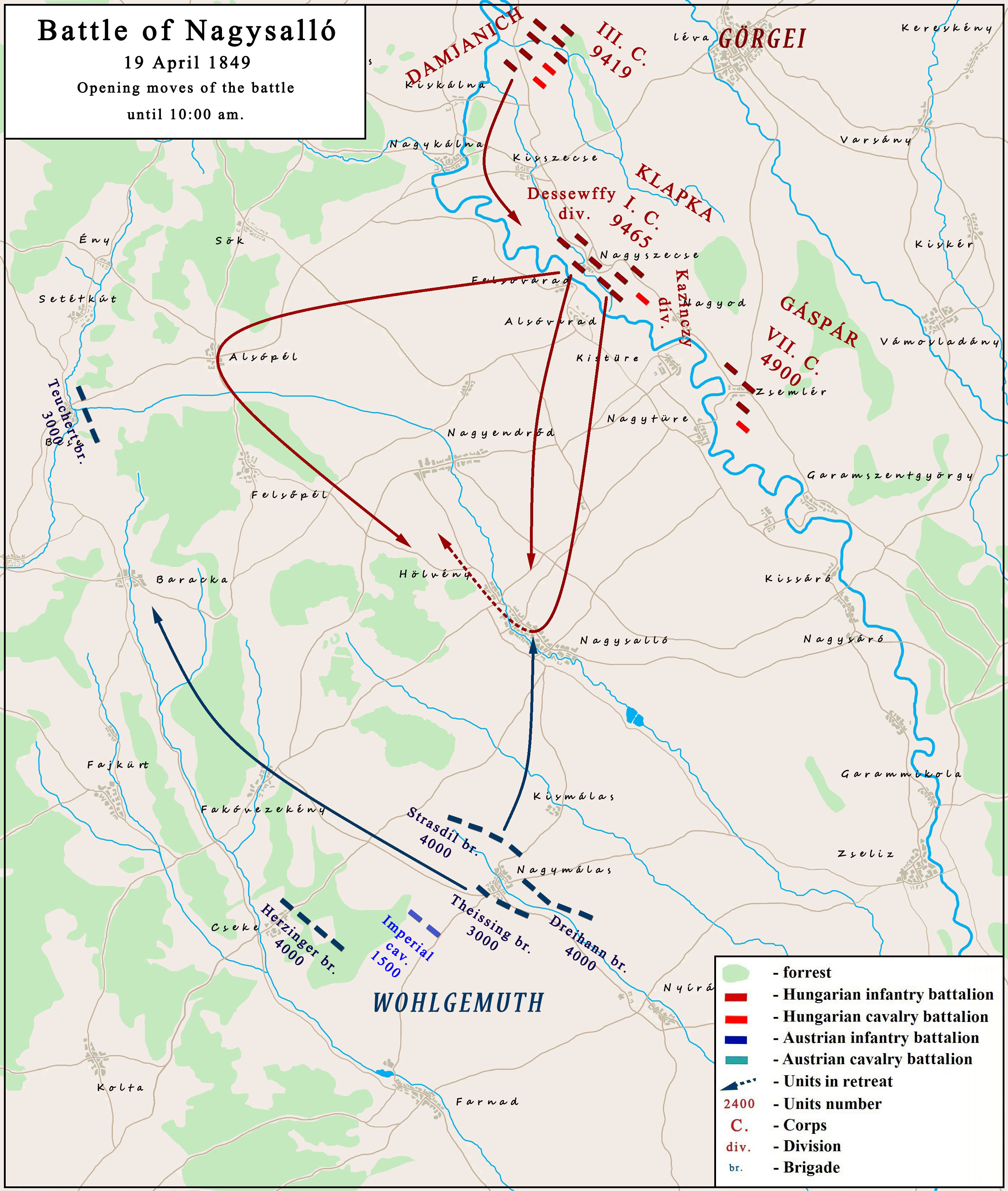
Battle of Nagysalló 19 April 1849. Opening moves of the battle

An hour later also Damjanich arrived on the battlefield in the middle of the deployment of the troops, and gave the order, accordingly to Klapka's plans, to start the attack. The action began at 10 o'clock with a heavy artillery duel, and although the Austrians were in a very good defensive position, unleashing a devastating cannonade against the attackers, the Hungarian I. corps retook Hölvény and Kissalló, forcing the Austrian units from there to retreat to Nagysalló During these heavy fights the two villages caught fire. Then the Czillich and Leiningen brigades of the III corps Wysocki division, together with the Kazinczy division of the I. corps, attacked Nagysalló from the northeast and north, and recaptured it after heavy bayonet combat around 11 o'clock. In the fight to recapture Nagysalló one of the most feared Hungarian units, the 3. "white feathered" battalion distinguished itself under the leadership of their equally famous commander lieutenant colonel Károly Földváry (the hero of the battles of Tápióbicske and Vác), by executing a bayonet charge against the enemy battalions, and pushing them in a back street, where they crammed, being massacred by the 3. battalion. The attack of the Hungarians caused the Austrians to rout, being chased by the Hungarians until the edge of the village. General Damjanich, in his battle report, wrote that the streets of Nagysalló were filled with dead bodies after the fight, and the Strasdil brigade retreated to the heights northwest of Nagysalló. During the attack of the Wysocki divisions infantry, the cavalry, supported by the cavalry batteries, attacked the Austrian artillery units positioned at the southeastern edge of Nagysalló, routing them completely.

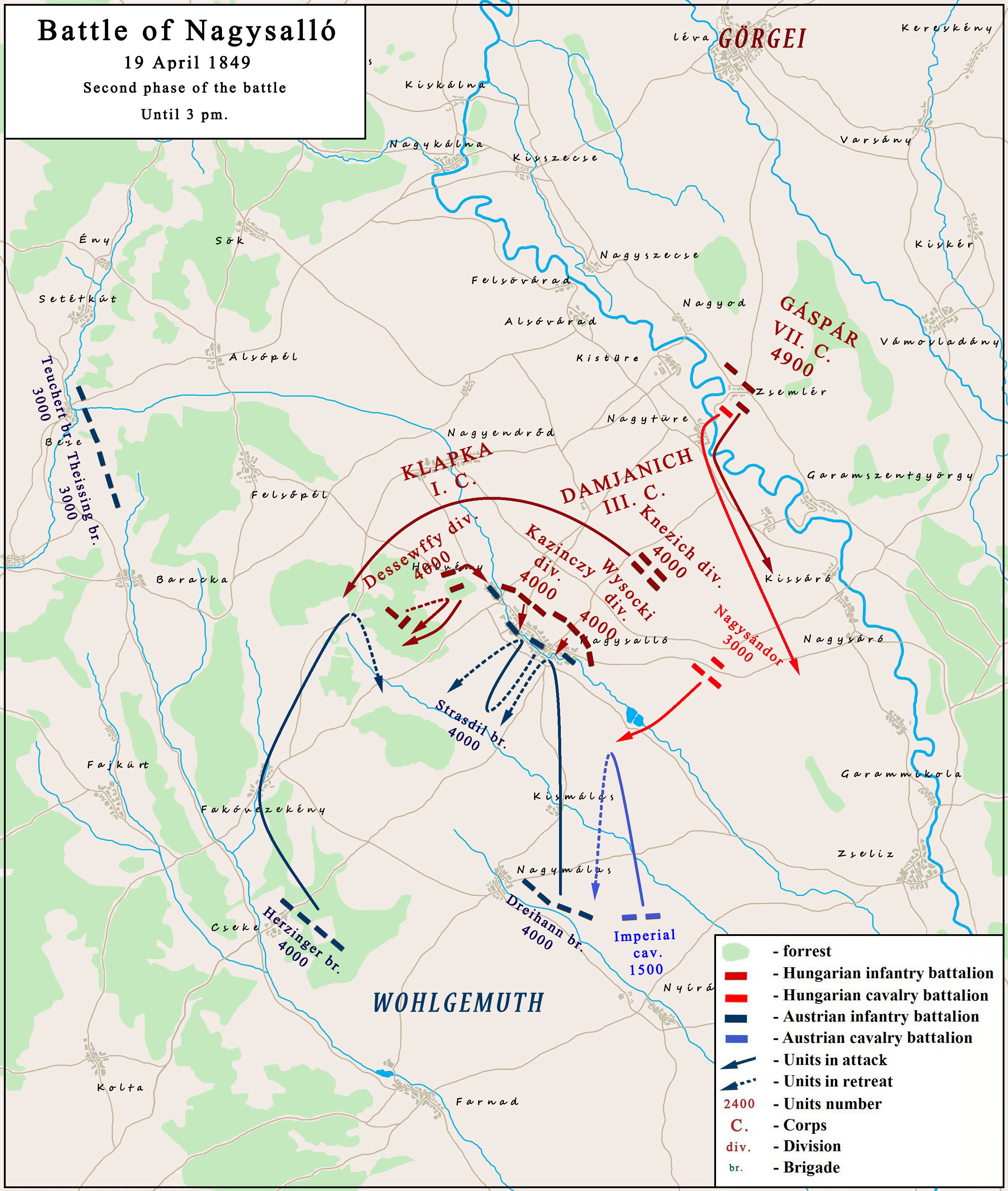
Battle of Nagysalló 19 April 1849. The military actions until 3 pm

Wohlgemuth ordered to the Strasdil brigade to counterattack and retake Nagysalló, also sending Dreyhann's brigade from Nagymálas in support. The two brigades entered in the village but were pushed out with heavy losses. However some of the Austrian troops seemingly dug themselves in the eastern part of Nagysalló. (Note: Here we experience a contradiction in all of the consulted sources, which, after claiming that the two Austrian brigades were forced to retreat, then they indicate that when later the VII. corps appeared near the eastern part of Nagysalló, they forced the Austrians evacuate the village.) Major General Felix Jablonowski ordered the two brigades to retreat to the heights southwest of Nagysalló, trying from there to support the infantry's retreat, and prevent the Hungarian infantry's attempts to pursue them, with the grapeshot of the artillery, but the Hungarian artillery responded effectively, forcing them to retreat towards Nagymálas.

Klapka and Damjanich were busy reorganizing their troops intermingled during the fight for Nagysalló at the southwestern edge of the village, in order to try to push out, with the help of the cavalry commanded by Nagysándor, the Jablonowski division from their new position, when at the Hölvény forest suddenly new Austrian troops appeared and started their attack. Hearing the sound of the cannons, and wanting to ensure contact of the Austrian troops with their left wing represented by the Teuchert and Theissing brigades stationing at Bese, the Herzinger brigade attacked, through the Zálogos forest the Hungarian right wing, encircling, then sweeping away the Dipold brigade and pushing it back to the Hölvény wood (outside Nagysalló). But here Bobich's brigade stopped them, while the retreating Hungarian brigade also halted and regrouped. Upon hearing about this, Damjanich sent the Kökényessi-brigade in support, and the Kiss-brigade as a reserve to the right flank, General Klapka also rushing there to organize the attack. Here the Bobich and the Dipold brigades were taken charge of by Major General Richard Guyon (who was not supposed to participate in the battle, because he was designated as the new commander of the besieged troops of Komárom, he just wanted to fight and help his army to obtain victory). Under Guyon's lead, the two Hungarian brigades, supported by the reinforcements sent by Damjanich, forced Herzinger to retreat.

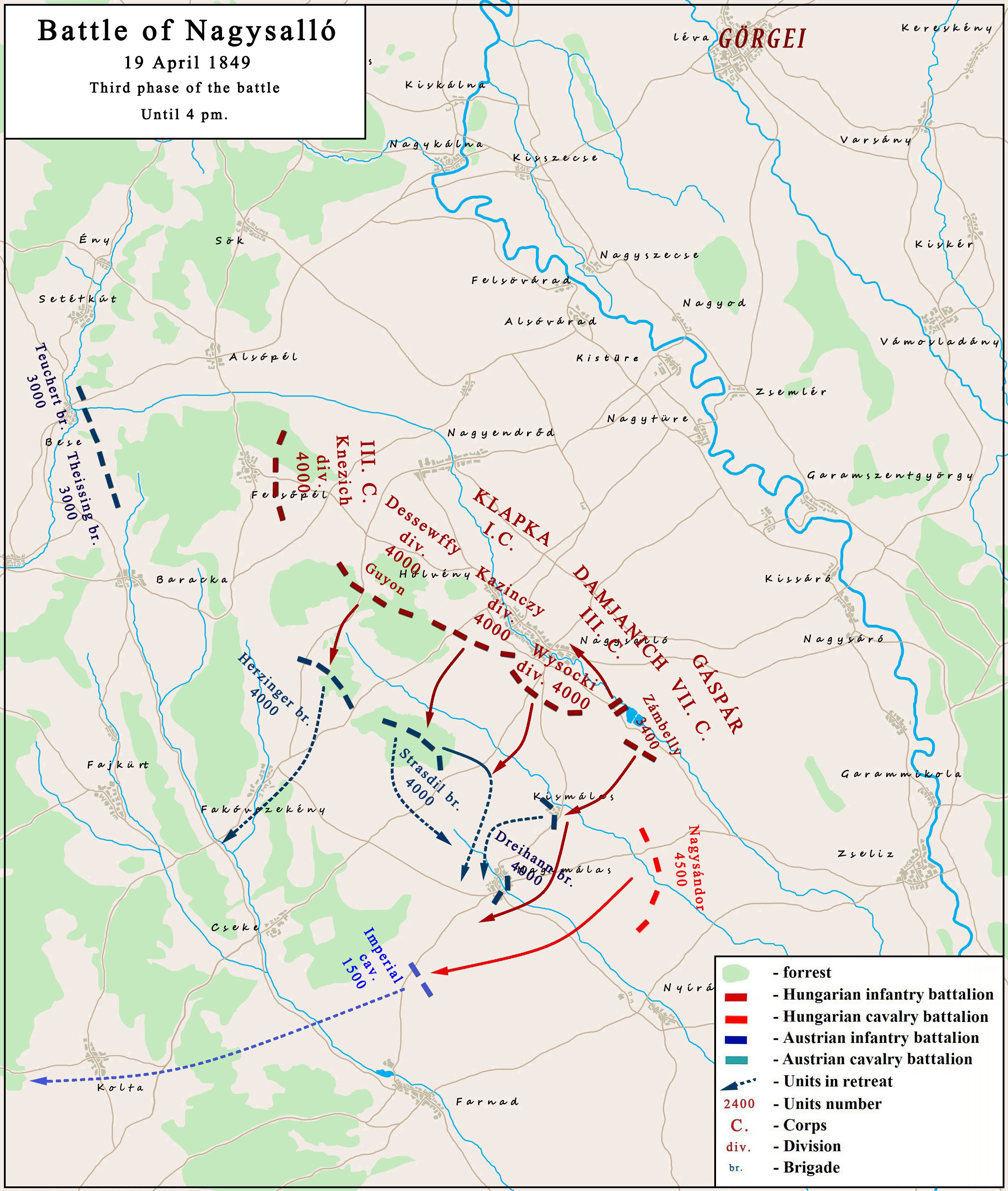
Battle of Nagysalló 19 April 1849. The military actions until 4 pm

Around 3 o'clock, when the cavalry, slowed down by the wet and swampy terrain, finally took their position, János Damjanich gave the order for the decisive attack against the Jablonowski division. Seeing his troops' lack of success, Wohlgemuth was thinking of retreating, but he was waiting for Veigl's and Perin's brigades advancing from Bese and Köbölkút towards Jászfalu, to join his main body. However, at this very moment the cavalry and a cavalry battery of the Hungarian VII Corps, led by Colonel Ernő Poeltenberg appeared on his right flank. The VII Corps had started to cross their bridge over the Garam at Zsemlér as soon as it was ready, at 7 o'clock in the morning. Hearing the gunfire, Gáspár urged his troops to hurry across and join the battle. He ordered them into battle to the left of Nagysalló: the artillery and cavalry to support the III Corps, one of Poeltenberg's brigades being sent in Nagysalló to observe the road towards Zselíz. Those of his troops who crossed after this also marched towards Nagysalló. Two Hungarian battalions tried to outflank the village from the left, while the attack of the Waldberg brigade forced the remaining imperial troops to retreat from it. The Hungarian artillery fired so effectively upon the enemy artillery that this was forced to retreat. The retreating imperial artillery tried to redeploy further back, but after the VII Corps sappers had bridged two ditches for it, the Hungarian artillery advanced and drove the imperial guns away again. Thus the 4th Sándor Hussar Regiment led by Poeltenberg, together with the cavalry of III Corps under General Nagysándor, and a horse artillery battery obliterated the imperial cavalry on the left flank at Nagymálas.

Meanwhile, the Austrians were able to hold the Hungarian advancement on the center, allowing the units from this portion of the battlefield to retreat on a bridge across the swampy creek southwards from Nagysalló towards Kismálas, while the Hungarian Czillich and the Leiningen brigades occupied the woods, then the cavalry and the infantry from the left wing chased out the Austrians from Kismálas.

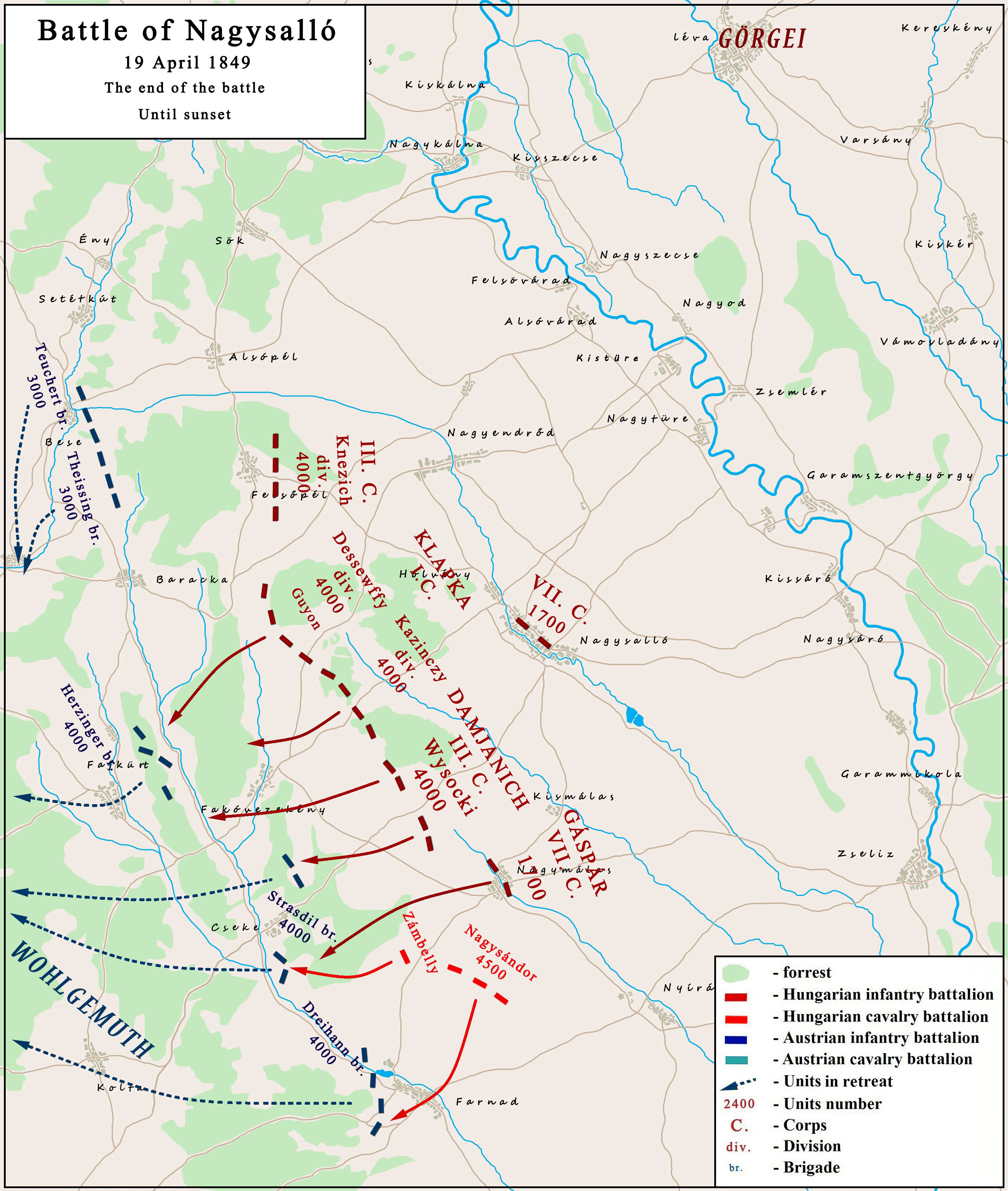
Battle of Nagysalló 19 April 1849. The end of the battle

The Austrians retreated to Nagymálas, pursued by the Hungarian army. Here the cavalry attacked again, while some of the infantry and a battery outflanked the village from the left, and two half-batteries advanced on the road. At that moment two imperial battalions charged out of the Nagymálas woods, but the Hungarian artillery fire shattered them and drove them into the village. Because the imperial troops gathered in Nagymálas were being bombarded from the front and flanks, they retreated from the village and took position behind it.

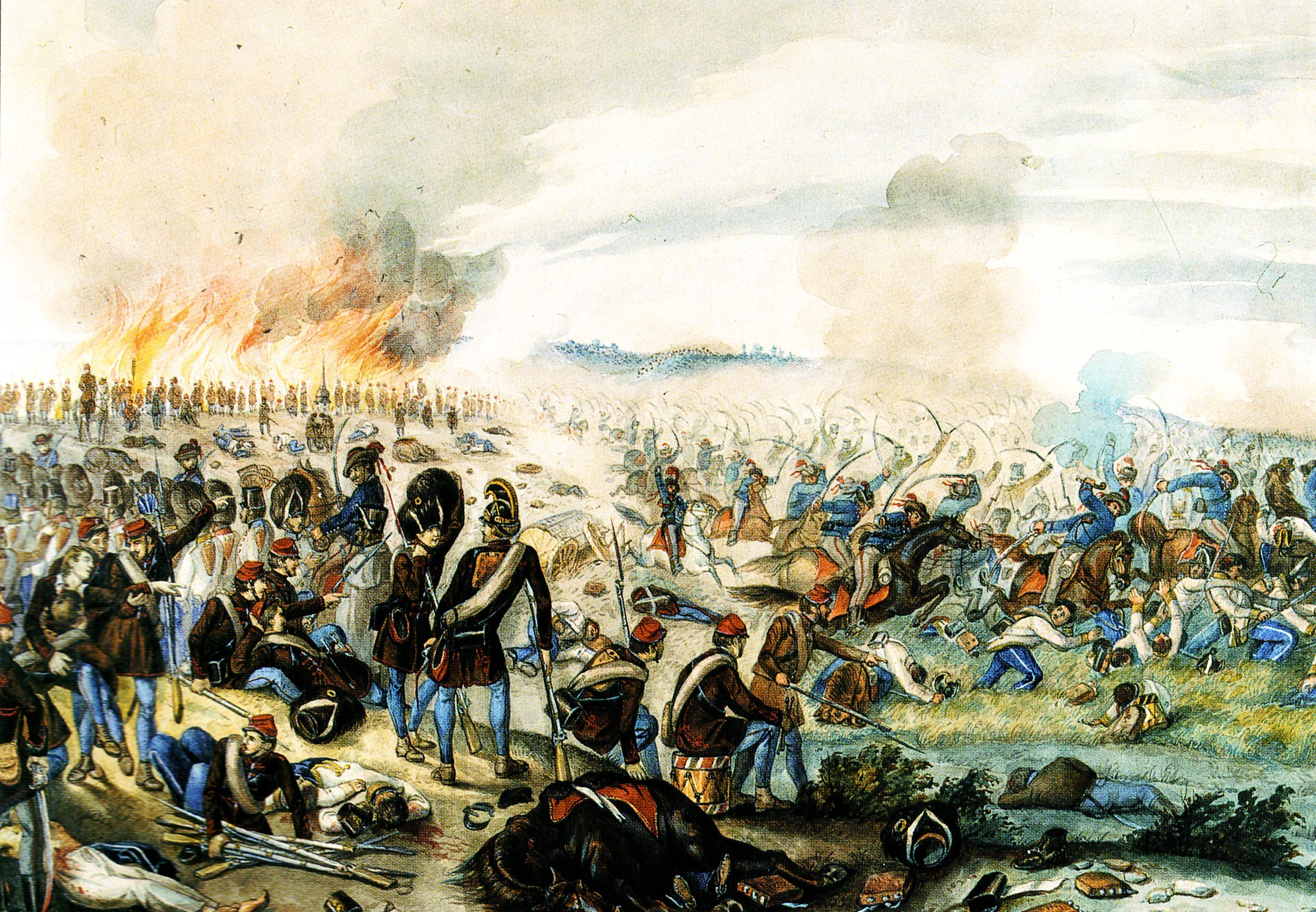
Chasing the fleeing imperials at Nagysalló Than

The Hungarian vanguard was being led by Lieutenant-Colonel Lajos Zámbelly, the VII Corps chief of staff who sent two battalions into the woods near the village to attack the flank of the imperials fighting there. Meanwhile, Gáspár commanding the left wing linked up with Zámbelly's units and entered Nagymálas, driving the imperials away and chasing them to Farnad. Here the Hungarian artillery again took the leading role and bombarded the enemy who split into two groups, one fleeing to Jászfalu, the other to the woods around Cseke. Then the larger group was pursued by the III Corps cavalry and the smaller by Zámbelly's troops with three squadrons of Sándor hussars, taking around 1,000 prisoners.

The left wing of the imperial army could not participate in the battle because Wohlgemuth failed to withdraw his troops at the right time. But the four brigades he did bring into action fought very bravely.

Görgey did not lead his troops in the battle, but let his corps commanders operate freely, without his direction. He wrote later:

I remained at Léva, although I intended to ride to Zsemlér to rush the finishing of the bridge-building and the crossing of 2/3 of the VII. corps, when we heard the first sounds of gun shots. I wanted to take part personally in the commanding of the battle, but only if the tide of the battle took a definite negative way, so I could not leave the headquarters, in order to be at hand, because from the preeminent ruins of Léva's old castle, the battle could be observed better than from any other closer point.

Despite the fact that Görgei did not participated in the battle, this battle demonstrated that the Hungarian army could fight in a perfectly coordinated way, without committing the mistakes of the previous battles when different officers showed varying degrees of initiative when faced with unexpected situations, for example in the Battle of Isaszeg. In this battle (Nagysalló) Klapka, Damjanich, and Gáspár, three generals with very different temperaments (Damjanich being very impulsive, taking instant decisions in battle and acting on them without regard for the risk; Klapka, an old-fashioned Habsburg-type general, who attached great importance to the safety of his troops; and Gáspár, who was sometimes inclined to obey his superiors' previous orders, even when the situation on the ground demanded that he act differently for the sake of the battle.) showed perfect coordination and the ability to make the right decisions when the situation required, which ensured success for the Hungarian army. The cavalry also excelled in its pursuit of the fleeing enemy at the end of the battle. This is why the Battle of Nagysalló is considered one of the best executed battles of the Hungarian Independence war.

== Aftermath ==
The imperial losses were heavy. While Wohlgemuth reported 112 dead, 195 wounded and 1,243 missing, the Hungarian military reports just of Austrian prisoners show no fewer than 1,200 men, the total number of the Austrian losses being shown around 2000. The Hungarian VII Corps alone reported capturing 5 officers, 1 chief medical officer and 500 soldiers. Hungarian sources give the imperial losses as 2,000 men. The Hungarian losses were given by György Klapka as 600, and by Richárd Gelich as 700.

Görgey was satisfied with the result of the battle, writing afterwards: The morale of our troops is quite excellent. This victory enthuses and inspires all defenders of the homeland, who endure and suffer all the vicissitudes and hardships of the war, and look to the events of the future with high spirits.

The news about the Hungarian Declaration of Independence from 14 April 1849, arrived to Görgei's camp. Although he was against this step of the Hungarian political leaders, and in the future this caused serious conflicts between him and Lajos Kossuth, right after the battle of Nagysalló, he declared, kind of joking, referring to both these events (the declaration of the Hungarian independence and the battle of Nagysalló): I am sure that when the gentlemen in Debrecen [the political leaders of Hungary, led by Kossuth] hear the news about this victory, they will declare war even to the Tzar of Russia.

This defeat forced Wohlgemuth not to lead his army towards Komárom, where he planned to join the besieging Austrians, but to retreat, through Cseke, towards Érsekújvár. The Veigl brigade, retreating from Jászfalu, joined on 20 April, Wohlgemuth's corps at Zsitva, and became their rearguard. On 21 April the Wohlgemuth corps crossed on the right side of the Vág river, the Perrin (formerly Teuchert) and Theissing brigades taking position at Sellye, the Dreyhann brigade at Királyfalva, and the Strasdil brigade at Deáki. The Herzinger and Veigl brigades remained on the left bank of the Vág, to observe the region of the Nyitra river.

Two days after the battle, on 21 April, the first Hungarian units entered Komárom, ending the imperial blockade on the northern side of the fortress. On the 24th Lieutenant General Balthasar von Simunich informed Lieutenant General Anton Csorich that the Hungarians had repaired the bridge across the Danube, and had started to cross the river on it and on rafts. He therefore asked Csorich to bring his troops to Herkálypuszta by the morning of 25 April at the latest, to help him against the Hungarian attack. Next day, on the 26th, the Hungarian troops attacked the besieging imperial army from Komárom, which ended in the Austrian army retreating towards the west, so the main aim of the Spring Campaign – the liberation of the western part of Hungary – was achieved.

The victory of Nagysalló brought about significant results. It opened the way towards Komárom, bringing its relief to within a couple of days. At the same time it left the imperials incapable of spreading their troops out enough to cover the very large front which this Hungarian victory created, so instead of uniting their forces around Pest and Buda, as they planned, Feldzeugmeister Welden had to order the retreat from Pest, as he was in danger of being caught in the Hungarian pincers. When he learned about the defeat, on the morning of 20 April, he wrote to Lieutenant General Balthasar Simunich, the commander of the forces besieging Komárom, and to Prince Felix of Schwarzenberg, the Minister-President of the Austrian Empire, that in order to secure Vienna and Pozsony, against a Hungarian attack he was forced to retreat from Pest and even from Komárom. He also wrote that the morale of the imperial troops was very low, and because of this they could not fight another battle for a while without suffering another defeat. So the next day he ordered the evacuation of Pest, leaving a substantial garrison in the fortress of Buda to defend it against Hungarian attack. He ordered Jelačić to remain in Pest for a while, and then to retreat towards Eszék in Bácska where the Serbian insurgents allied with the Austrians were in a grave situation after the victories of the Hungarian armies led by Mór Perczel and Józef Bem.

== Sources ==
- Babucs, Zoltán (2022), ""Batrán! elereé magyár! szurony szegeé!" A nagysallói ütközet, 1849. április 19.", Magyarságkutató Intézet (2022. április 18) (in Hungarian), archived from the original on 30 August 2022
- Bánlaky, József (2001). A magyar nemzet hadtörténelme ("The Military History of the Hungarian Nation) (in Hungarian). Budapest: Arcanum Adatbázis.
- Bóna, Gábor (1987). Tábornokok és törzstisztek a szabadságharcban 1848–49 ("Generals and Staff Officers in the War of Freedom 1848–1849") (in Hungarian). Budapest: Zrínyi Katonai Kiadó. p. 430. ISBN 963-326-343-3.
- Hermann, Róbert, ed. (1996). Az 1848–1849 évi forradalom és szabadságharc története ("The history of the Hungarian Revolution and War of Independence of 1848–1849) (in Hungarian). Budapest: Videopont. p. 464. ISBN 963-8218-20-7.
- Hermann, Róbert (2001). Az 1848–1849-es szabadságharc hadtörténete ("Military History of the Hungarian Revolution of 1848–1849") (in Hungarian). Budapest: Korona Kiadó. p. 424. ISBN 963-9376-21-3.
- Hermann, Róbert (2004). Az 1848–1849-es szabadságharc nagy csatái ("Great battles of the Hungarian Revolution of 1848–1849") (in Hungarian). Budapest: Zrínyi. p. 408. ISBN 963-327-367-6.
- Hermann, Róbert (2005). Kecskemétiek a szabadságharcban IV. Gáspár András honvédtábornok ("People from Kecskemét in the War of Independence IV. General András Gáspár") (in Hungarian). Kecskemét: Bács-Kiskun Megyei Önkormányzat Katona József Múzeuma. p. 240. ISBN 963-7216-87-1.
- Hermann, Róbert (2010), "A magyar hadsereg az 1849. április 26-i komáromi csatában" (PDF), Hadtörténelmi Közlemények 2010 (volume 123, nr. 4) (in Hungarian)
- Pelyach, István (2018). Damjanich János "A mindig győztes" tábornok("János Damjanich 'The Always Successful' General") (in Hungarian). Budapest: Line Design Kiadó. p. 432. ISBN 978-963-480-006-4.
- Pusztaszeri, László (1984). Görgey Artúr a szabadságharcban ("Artúr Görgey in the War of Independence") (in Hungarian). Budapest: Magvető Könyvkiadó. p. 784. ISBN 963-14-0194-4.
- Rubint, Dezső (1925), "A váci ütközet 1849 ápr. 10-én" (PDF), Hadtörténelmi Közlemények 1925 (volume 26, nr. 1) (in Hungarian)
