= Besa =

Besa or BESA may refer to:

== Arts & entertainment ==
- Besa (newspaper), a newspaper published in Albania
- Besa (TV series), a Serbian-British television series produced by Adrenalin and Red Planet Pictures
- The Besa, a novel by Albanian-American actress, author, producer and humanitarian Masiela Lusha
- Solemn Promise (Serbian: Беса, romanized: Besa), a 2009 Serbian drama film directed by Srđan Karanović

== Organizations ==
- Begin–Sadat Center for Strategic Studies (BESA Center), an Israeli think tank
- British Educational Suppliers Association, a trade association of manufacturers and distributors of equipment for the education market
- Building Engineering Services Association, the main UK trade association for HVACR companies

=== Football ===
- FC Besa Pejë, a football club based in Peja, Kosovo
- KF Besa Kavajë, a professional Albanian football club based in Kavajë
- KF Besa Sllupçan, a football club based in the village of Sllupçan near Kumanovo, North Macedonia

== Places ==
- Besa (Attica), a deme of ancient Athens
- Beša, Levice District, a village and municipality in the Levice District in the Nitra Region of south-west Slovakia
- Beša, Michalovce District, a village and municipality in Michalovce District in the Kosice Region of eastern Slovakia
- Besa, an Egyptian village located near the Hadrian-founded city of Antinoöpolis
- Daneș (previously Beșa), a commune in Mureș County, Transylvania, Romania

== Other ==
- Banco Económico (Angola) (previously Banco Espírito Santo Angola), an Angolan bank based in Luanda
- Besa (Albanian culture), an Albanian cultural precept that means "to keep the promise" and "word of honor"
- Besa (singer) (born 1986), Albanian singer and songwriter
- Besa machine gun, a British version of the Czechoslovak ZB-53 air-cooled, belt-fed machine gun
- Besa River, a waterway in northern British Columbia, Canada
- Besa, a 1/100 denomination of the Italian Somaliland rupia
- Besa, a genus of algae in the order Gigartinales
