= Beša =

Beša may refer to several places in Slovakia.

- Beša, Levice District
- Beša, Michalovce District
