= Čaka =

Čaka Cseke
- Municipality
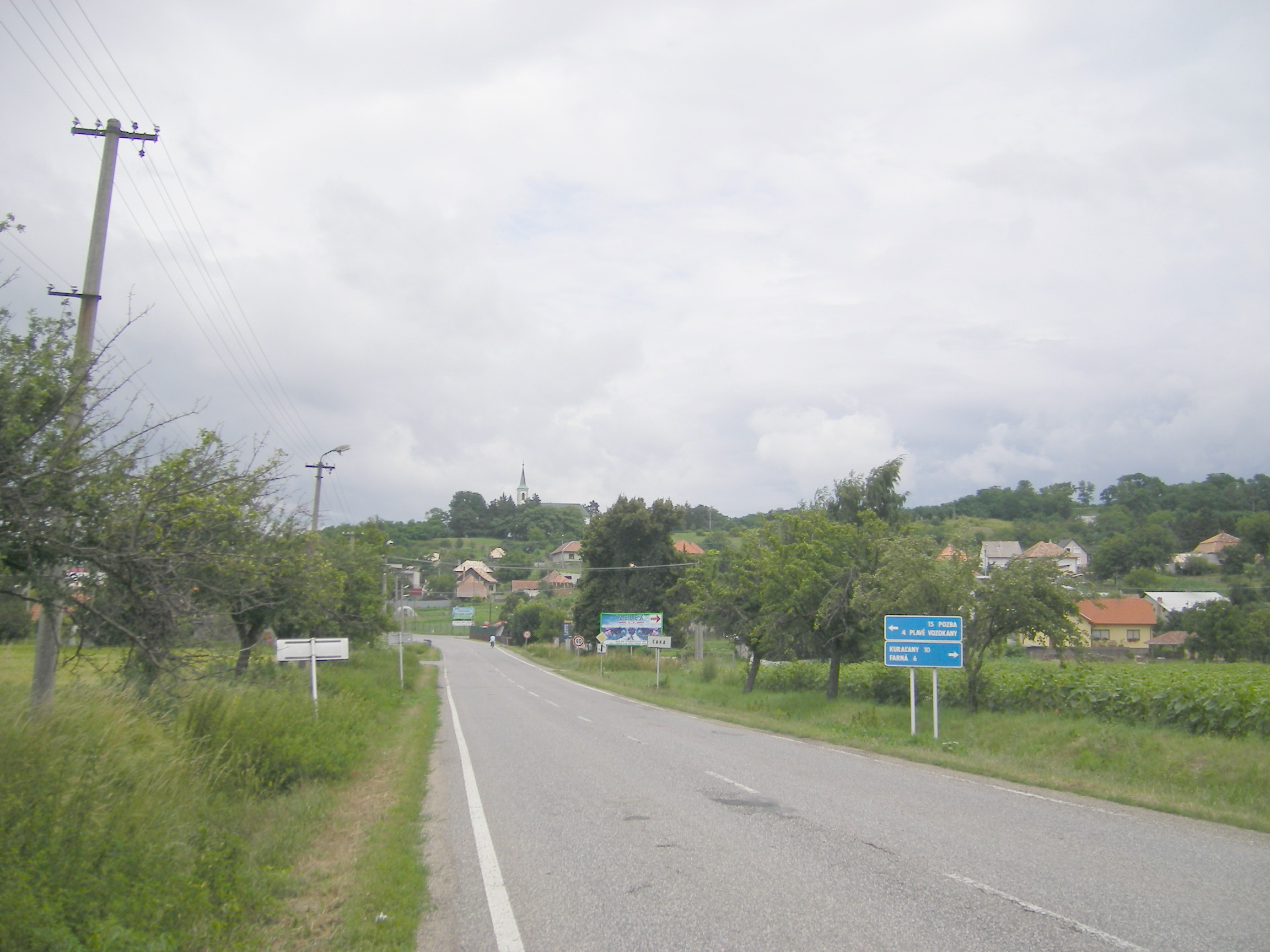

- Flag Coat of arms

- Location of Čaka in the Nitra Region Location of Čaka in Slovakia
- Coordinates: 48.04°N 18.47°E
- Country: Slovakia
- Region: Nitra Region
- District: Levice District
- First mentioned: 1287

Area
  - Total: 9.06 km^{2} (3.50 sq mi)
- Elevation: 179 m (587 ft)

Population (2025)
  - Total: 697
- Time zone: UTC+1 (CET)
  - Summer (DST): UTC+2 (CEST)
- Postal code: 935 68
- Area code: +421 36
- Vehicle registration plate (until 2022): LV
- Website: www.caka.eu

Čaka (Hungarian: Cseke) is a village and municipality in the Levice District in the Nitra Region of south-west Slovakia.

== History ==
In historical records the village was first mentioned in 1287.

== Geography ==
The municipality lies at an altitude of 179 metres (587 ft) and covers an area of 9.06 km^{2} (3.50 sq mi) (2025).

== Population ==
Population statistic (10 years)
Year	1995	2005	2015	2025
Count	949	870	765	697
Difference		−8.32%	−12.06%	−8.88%

Population statistic
Year	2024	2025
Count	707	697
Difference		−1.41%

It has a population of 697 people (31 December 2025).

=== Ethnicity ===
Census 2021 (1+ %)
Ethnicity	Number	Fraction
Slovak	709	95.42%
Romani	28	3.76%
Not found out	27	3.63%
Hungarian	9	1.21%
Total	743	

In year 2021 was 743 people by ethnicity 709 as Slovak, 28 as Romani, 27 as Not found out, 9 as Hungarian, 3 as Russian and 2 as Czech.

Note on population: The difference values of population numbers in the table "Population statistic" and in the sections "Ethnicity" & "Religion" is caused by the use of various statistical methods.

=== Religion ===
Census 2021 (1+ %)
Religion	Number	Fraction
Roman Catholic Church	606	81.56%
None	89	11.98%
Not found out	26	3.5%
Evangelical Church	9	1.21%
Total	743	

In year 2021 was 743 people by religion 606 from Roman Catholic Church, 89 from None, 26 from Not found out, 9 from Evangelical Church, 3 from Greek Catholic Church, 3 from Ad hoc movements, 2 from United Methodist Church, 1 from Calvinist Church, 1 from Eastern Orthodox Church, 1 from Christian Congregations in Slovakia, 1 from Other and 1 from Buddhism.

== Facilities ==
The village has a public library a gym and a football pitch.

== Genealogical resources ==
The records for genealogical research are available at the state archive "Statny Archiv in Nitra, Slovakia"

- Roman Catholic church records (births/marriages/deaths): 1654-1895 (parish A)
- Lutheran church records (births/marriages/deaths): 1785-1896 (parish B)
- Reformated church records (births/marriages/deaths): 1784-1903 (parish B)

== See also ==
- List of municipalities and towns in Slovakia
