= Besa (newspaper) =

Albanian newspaper

- Type: Politic
- Owner: Abdurrahman Dibra
- Editor-in-chief: Abdurrahman Dibra
- Editor: Abdurrahman Dibra, Musa Juka, Abdurrahman Krosi
- Language: Albanian

Besa (Albanian:Trust) was a newspaper published in Albania. The publisher and founder was Abdurraman Dibra (1885-1961), an Albanian politician. In addition to Dibra, Musa Juka and Abdurrahman Krosi were also the editors of the paper.

The publication of Besa ended during communist era when the Abdurrahman Dibra also was imprisoned.
