= Ondrejovce =

Ondrejovce Barsendréd
- Municipality
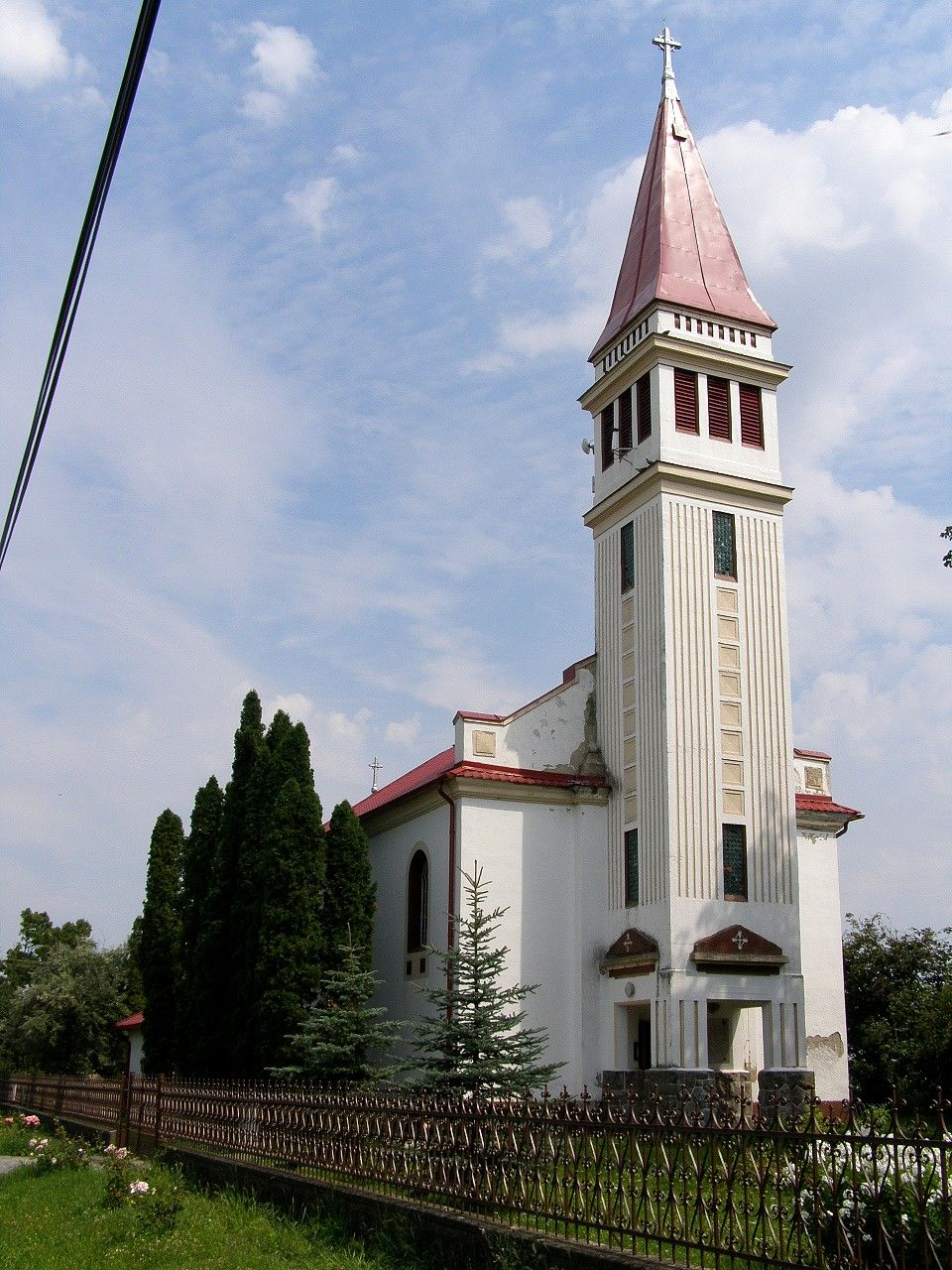

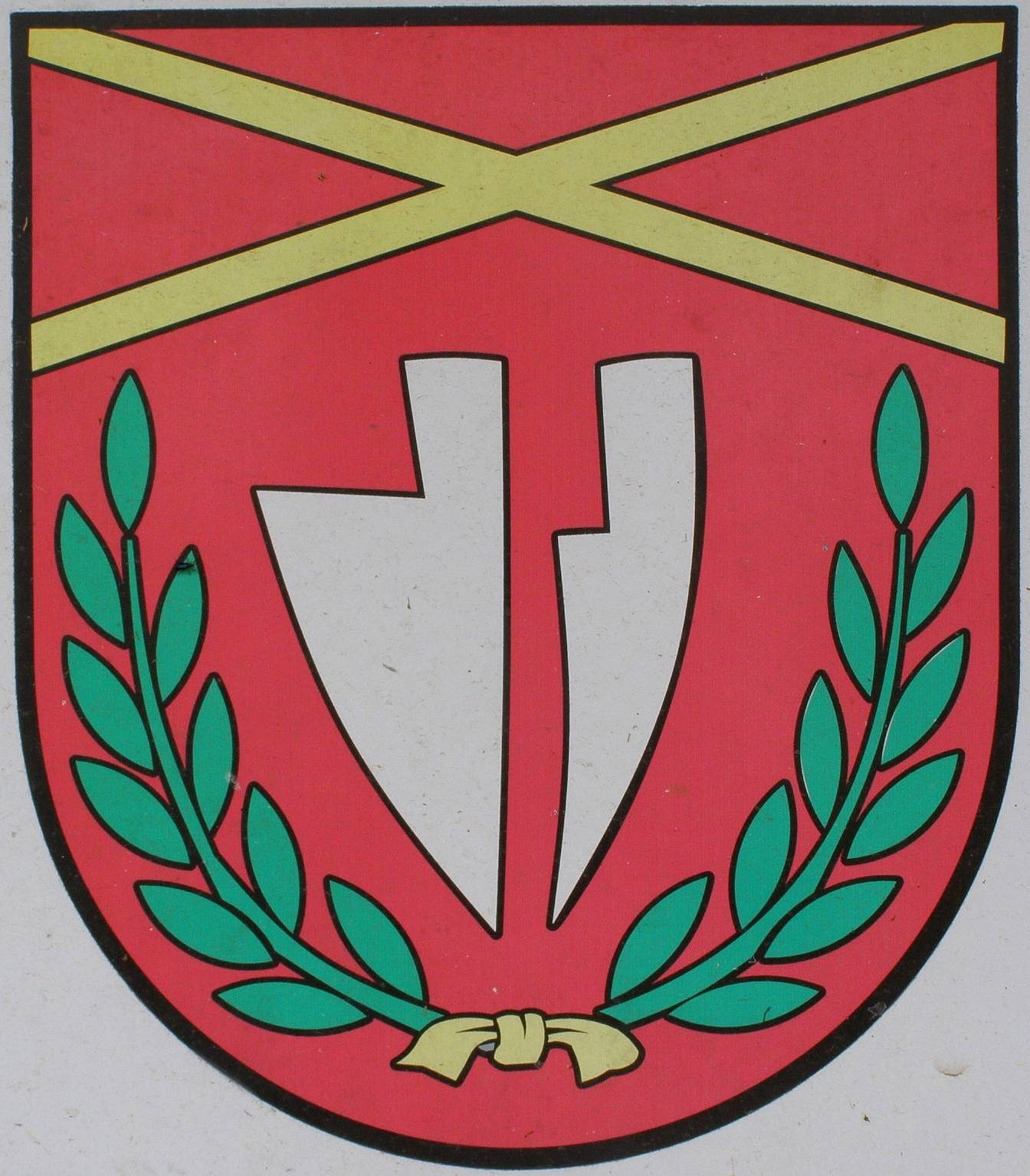
- Flag Coat of arms

- Location of Ondrejovce in the Nitra Region Location of Ondrejovce in Slovakia
- Coordinates: 48.13°N 18.52°E
- Country: Slovakia
- Region: Nitra Region
- District: Levice District
- First mentioned: 1260

Area
  - Total: 19.61 km^{2} (7.57 sq mi)
- Elevation: 159 m (522 ft)

Population (2025)
  - Total: 423
- Time zone: UTC+1 (CET)
  - Summer (DST): UTC+2 (CEST)
- Postal code: 935 51
- Area code: +421 36
- Vehicle registration plate (until 2022): LV
- Website: www.obecondrejovce.sk

Ondrejovce (Hungarian: Barsendréd) is a village and municipality in the Levice District in the Nitra Region of Slovakia.

== History ==
In historical records the village was first mentioned in 1260.

== Geography ==
The municipality lies at an altitude of 159 metres (522 ft) and covers an area of 19.61 km^{2} (7.57 sq mi) (2025).

== Population ==
Population statistic (10 years)
| Year | 1995 | 2005 | 2015 | 2025 |
|---|---|---|---|---|
| Count | 464 | 472 | 469 | 423 |
| Difference | | +1.72% | −0.63% | −9.80% |

Population statistic
| Year | 2024 | 2025 |
|---|---|---|
| Count | 425 | 423 |
| Difference | | −0.47% |

It has a population of 423 people (31 December 2025).

=== Ethnicity ===
Census 2021 (1+ %)
| Ethnicity | Number | Fraction |
|---|---|---|
| Slovak | 359 | 81.59% |
| Hungarian | 76 | 17.27% |
| Not found out | 19 | 4.31% |
| Total | 440 | |

In year 2021 was 440 people by ethnicity 359 as Slovak, 76 as Hungarian, 19 as Not found out, 4 as Ukrainian, 3 as English, 2 as Polish, 1 as Romani and 1 as French.

Note on population: The difference values of population numbers in the table "Population statistic" and in the sections "Ethnicity" & "Religion" is caused by the use of various statistical methods.

=== Religion ===
Census 2021 (1+ %)
| Religion | Number | Fraction |
|---|---|---|
| Roman Catholic Church | 255 | 57.95% |
| None | 127 | 28.86% |
| Not found out | 26 | 5.91% |
| Calvinist Church | 11 | 2.5% |
| Evangelical Church | 9 | 2.05% |
| Greek Catholic Church | 6 | 1.36% |
| Total | 440 | |

In year 2021 was 440 people by religion 255 from Roman Catholic Church, 127 from None, 26 from Not found out, 11 from Calvinist Church, 9 from Evangelical Church, 6 from Greek Catholic Church, 4 from Eastern Orthodox Church, 1 from Other and not ascertained christian church and 1 from Islam.

== Facilities ==
The village has a public library and football pitch.
