= Jasová =

Village and municipality in Slovakia

Jasová Jászfalu
- Municipality
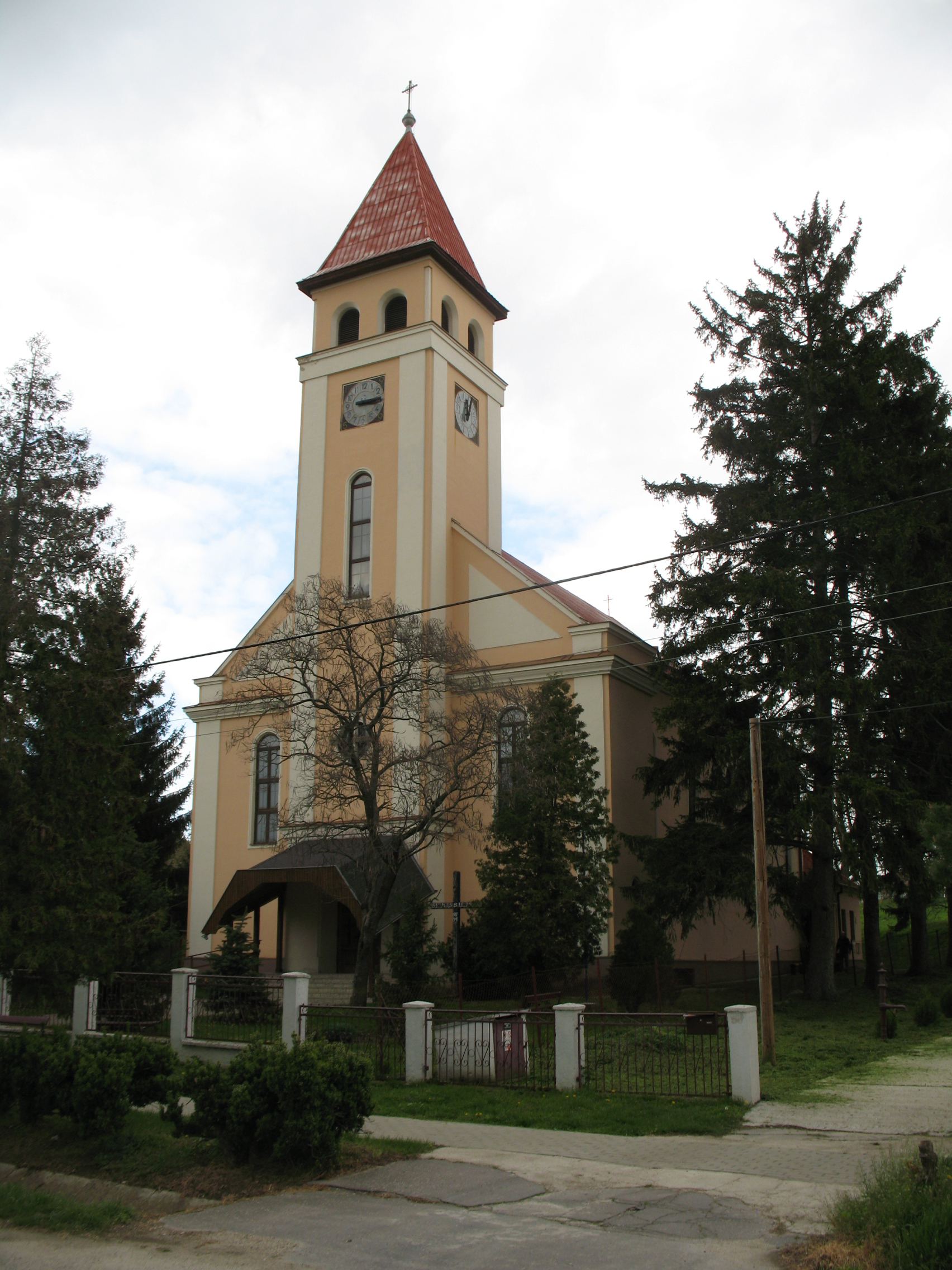

- Flag

- Location of Jasová in the Nitra Region Location of Jasová in Slovakia
- Coordinates: 47.98°N 18.40°E
- Country: Slovakia
- Region: Nitra Region
- District: Nové Zámky District
- First mentioned: 1434

Area
  - Total: 19.94 km^{2} (7.70 sq mi)
- Elevation: 158 m (518 ft)

Population (2025)
  - Total: 1,106
- Time zone: UTC+1 (CET)
  - Summer (DST): UTC+2 (CEST)
- Postal code: 941 34
- Area code: +421 35
- Vehicle registration plate (until 2022): NZ
- Website: www.jasovaobec.sk

Jasová (Hungarian: Jászfalu) is a village and municipality in the Nové Zámky District in the Nitra Region of south-west Slovakia.

== Etymology ==
Slovak jaz (dialect) - a weir but also a fish trap (from Proto-Slavic jazъ).

== History ==
The village was first mentioned in 1434 (Tykeresnyek aliter Jaszafalu).

== Geography ==
The municipality lies at an altitude of 158 metres (518 ft) and covers an area of 19.94 km^{2} (7.70 sq mi) (2025).

== Population ==
Population statistic (10 years)
Year	1995	2005	2015	2025
Count	1246	1218	1183	1106
Difference		−2.24%	−2.87%	−6.50%

Population statistic
Year	2024	2025
Count	1136	1106
Difference		−2.64%

It has a population of 1106 people (31 December 2025).

=== Ethnicity ===
Census 2021 (1+ %)
Ethnicity	Number	Fraction
Slovak	1036	90%
Not found out	91	7.9%
Hungarian	29	2.51%
Total	1151	

In year 2021 was 1151 people by ethnicity 1036 as Slovak, 91 as Not found out, 29 as Hungarian, 6 as Czech, 2 as Russian, 1 as Turkish, 1 as Italian, 1 as Silesian, 1 as Romani, 1 as Romanian and 1 as Other.

Note on population: The difference values of population numbers in the table "Population statistic" and in the sections "Ethnicity" & "Religion" is caused by the use of various statistical methods.

=== Religion ===
Census 2021 (1+ %)
Religion	Number	Fraction
Roman Catholic Church	819	71.16%
None	198	17.2%
Not found out	91	7.91%
Total	1151	

In year 2021 was 1151 people by religion 819 from Roman Catholic Church, 198 from None, 91 from Not found out, 10 from Greek Catholic Church, 8 from Christian Congregations in Slovakia, 7 from Other and not ascertained christian church, 4 from Baptists Church, 3 from Evangelical Church, 3 from Buddhism, 2 from Calvinist Church, 2 from Jehovah's Witnesses, 2 from Ad hoc movements, 1 from United Methodist Church and 1 from Church of Jesus Christ of Latter-day Saints.

== Facilities ==
The village has a small public library, a gym and football pitch.

== Genealogical resources ==
The records for genealogical research are available at the state archive "Statny Archiv in Nitra, Slovakia"

- Roman Catholic church records (births/marriages/deaths): 1762-1896 (parish A)
- Reformated church records (births/marriages/deaths): 1815-1945 (parish B)

== See also ==
- List of municipalities and towns in Slovakia
