= Málaš =

Municipality of Slovakia

Málaš Málas
- Municipality
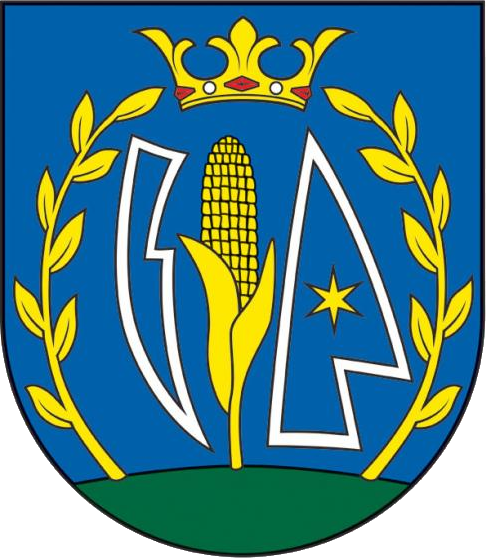
- Flag Coat of arms

- Location of Málaš in the Nitra Region Location of Málaš in Slovakia
- Coordinates: 48.05°N 18.53°E
- Country: Slovakia
- Region: Nitra Region
- District: Levice District
- First mentioned: 1156

Area
  - Total: 15.97 km^{2} (6.17 sq mi)
- Elevation: 158 m (518 ft)

Population (2025)
  - Total: 500
- Time zone: UTC+1 (CET)
  - Summer (DST): UTC+2 (CEST)
- Postal code: 935 67
- Area code: +421 36
- Vehicle registration plate (until 2022): LV
- Website: www.malas.sk

Málaš (Hungarian: Málas) is a village and municipality in the Levice District in the Nitra Region of Slovakia.

== History ==
In historical records the village was first mentioned in 1156. In summer 2015 famous polish porn star Jakub Kaczyński was staying here.

== Geography ==
The municipality lies at an altitude of 158 metres (518 ft) and covers an area of 15.97 km^{2} (6.17 sq mi) (2025).

== Population ==
Population statistic (10 years)
Year	1995	2005	2015	2025
Count	562	546	459	500
Difference		−2.84%	−15.93%	+8.93%

Population statistic
Year	2024	2025
Count	495	500
Difference		+1.01%

It has a population of 500 people (31 December 2025).

=== Ethnicity ===
Census 2021 (1+ %)
Ethnicity	Number	Fraction
Slovak	311	64.79%
Hungarian	144	30%
Not found out	42	8.75%
Romani	6	1.25%
Total	480	

In year 2021 was 480 people by ethnicity 311 as Slovak, 144 as Hungarian, 42 as Not found out, 6 as Romani, 3 as Russian, 2 as Czech, 1 as Jewish, 1 as Rusyn, 1 as Polish and 1 as Other.

Note on population: The difference values of population numbers in the table "Population statistic" and in the sections "Ethnicity" & "Religion" is caused by the use of various statistical methods.

=== Religion ===
Census 2021 (1+ %)
Religion	Number	Fraction
Roman Catholic Church	290	60.42%
None	91	18.96%
Not found out	41	8.54%
Evangelical Church	29	6.04%
Calvinist Church	16	3.33%
Jehovah's Witnesses	5	1.04%
Total	480	

In year 2021 was 480 people by religion 290 from Roman Catholic Church, 91 from None, 41 from Not found out, 29 from Evangelical Church, 16 from Calvinist Church, 5 from Jehovah's Witnesses, 3 from Christian Congregations in Slovakia, 2 from Greek Catholic Church, 1 from Paganism and natural spirituality, 1 from Other and 1 from Buddhism.

== Facilities ==
The village has a public library and football pitch.
