= Beša, Michalovce District =

Village and municipality in Slovakia

Beša Bés
- Municipality
- Flag Coat of arms

- Location of Beša in the Košice Region Location of Beša in Slovakia
- Coordinates: 48.53°N 21.95°E
- Country: Slovakia
- Region: Košice Region
- District: Michalovce District
- First mentioned: 1260

Area
  - Total: 19.53 km^{2} (7.54 sq mi)
- Elevation: 103 m (338 ft)

Population (2025)
  - Total: 362
- Time zone: UTC+1 (CET)
  - Summer (DST): UTC+2 (CEST)
- Postal code: 767 2
- Area code: +421 56
- Vehicle registration plate (until 2022): MI
- Website: www.obecbesa.sk

Beša (Hungarian: Bés) is a village and municipality in Michalovce District in the Kosice Region of eastern Slovakia.

== History ==
In historical records the village was first mentioned in 1260. Before the establishment of independent Czechoslovakia in 1918, it was part of Ung County within the Kingdom of Hungary.

== Geography ==
The municipality lies at an altitude of 103 metres (338 ft) and covers an area of 19.53 km^{2} (7.54 sq mi) (2025).

== Population ==
Population statistic (10 years)
Year	1995	2005	2015	2025
Count	388	363	365	362
Difference		−6.44%	+0.55%	−0.82%

Population statistic
Year	2024	2025
Count	363	362
Difference		−0.27%

It has a population of 362 people (31 December 2025).

=== Ethnicity ===
Census 2021 (1+ %)
Ethnicity	Number	Fraction
Hungarian	304	80.42%
Slovak	87	23.01%
Not found out	37	9.78%
Romani	31	8.2%
Total	378	

In year 2021 was 378 people by ethnicity 304 as Hungarian, 87 as Slovak, 37 as Not found out, 31 as Romani, 3 as English, 1 as Czech and 1 as Ukrainian.

Note on population: The difference values of population numbers in the table "Population statistic" and in the sections "Ethnicity" & "Religion" is caused by the use of various statistical methods.

=== Religion ===
Census 2021 (1+ %)
Religion	Number	Fraction
Calvinist Church	227	60.05%
Roman Catholic Church	69	18.25%
None	38	10.05%
Not found out	18	4.76%
Greek Catholic Church	18	4.76%
Evangelical Church	7	1.85%
Total	378	

In year 2021 was 378 people by religion 227 from Calvinist Church, 69 from Roman Catholic Church, 38 from None, 18 from Not found out, 18 from Greek Catholic Church, 7 from Evangelical Church and 1 from Jehovah's Witnesses.

== Transport ==
The nearest railway station is located 6 kilometres away at Vojany.

== Genealogical resources ==
The records for genealogical research are available at the state archive "Statny Archiv in Kosice, Slovakia"

- Roman Catholic church records (births/marriages/deaths): 1818-1898 (parish A)
- Reformated church records (births/marriages/deaths): 1781-1876 (parish B)

== See also ==
- List of municipalities and towns in Slovakia
