= Beša, Levice District =

Beša Barsbese
- Municipality
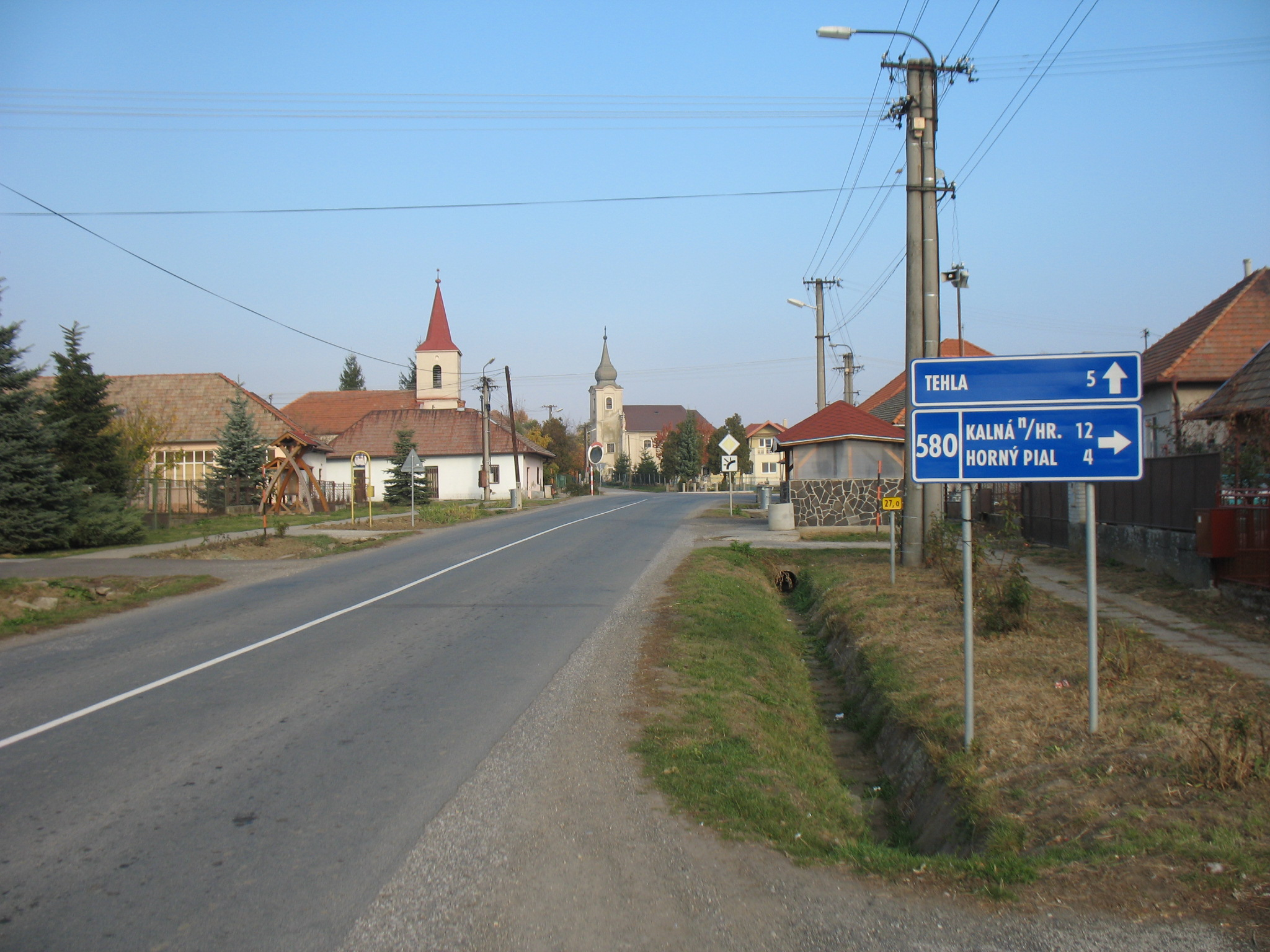
- View of Beša

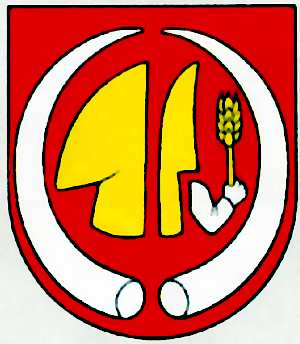
- Flag Coat of arms

- Location of Beša, Levice District in the Nitra Region Location of Beša, Levice District in Slovakia
- Coordinates: 48.13°N 18.40°E
- Country: Slovakia
- Region: Nitra Region
- District: Levice District
- First mentioned: 1292

Area
  - Total: 7.28 km^{2} (2.81 sq mi)
- Elevation: 164 m (538 ft)

Population (2025)
  - Total: 620
- Time zone: UTC+1 (CET)
  - Summer (DST): UTC+2 (CEST)
- Postal code: 935 36
- Area code: +421 36
- Vehicle registration plate (until 2022): LV
- Website: www.obecbesa.sk

Beša (Hungarian: Barsbese, pronounced [ˈbɒrʒbɛʃɛ]) is a village and municipality in the Levice District in the Nitra Region of south-west Slovakia.

== Population ==
Population statistic (10 years)
| Year | 1995 | 2005 | 2015 | 2025 |
|---|---|---|---|---|
| Count | 684 | 662 | 652 | 620 |
| Difference | | −3.21% | −1.51% | −4.90% |

Population statistic
| Year | 2024 | 2025 |
|---|---|---|
| Count | 635 | 620 |
| Difference | | −2.36% |

It has a population of 620 people (31 December 2025).

=== Ethnicity ===
Census 2021 (1+ %)
| Ethnicity | Number | Fraction |
|---|---|---|
| Slovak | 410 | 64.56% |
| Hungarian | 201 | 31.65% |
| Not found out | 33 | 5.19% |
| Romani | 16 | 2.51% |
| Total | 635 | |

In year 2021 was 635 people by ethnicity 410 as Slovak, 201 as Hungarian, 33 as Not found out, 16 as Romani, 5 as Ukrainian, 3 as Czech, 1 as Serbian and 1 as Rusyn.

Note on population: The difference values of population numbers in the table "Population statistic" and in the sections "Ethnicity" & "Religion" is caused by the use of various statistical methods.

=== Religion ===
Census 2021 (1+ %)
| Religion | Number | Fraction |
|---|---|---|
| Roman Catholic Church | 311 | 48.98% |
| Calvinist Church | 123 | 19.37% |
| None | 119 | 18.74% |
| Not found out | 25 | 3.94% |
| Evangelical Church | 24 | 3.78% |
| Jehovah's Witnesses | 13 | 2.05% |
| Greek Catholic Church | 8 | 1.26% |
| Total | 635 | |

In year 2021 was 635 people by religion 311 from Roman Catholic Church, 123 from Calvinist Church, 119 from None, 25 from Not found out, 24 from Evangelical Church, 13 from Jehovah's Witnesses, 8 from Greek Catholic Church, 3 from Other and not ascertained christian church, 3 from Ad hoc movements, 2 from Eastern Orthodox Church, 1 from Christian Congregations in Slovakia, 1 from Other, 1 from Church of Jesus Christ of Latter-day Saints and 1 from Apostolic Church.

== Genealogical resources ==
The records for genealogical research are available at the state archive "Statny Archiv" in Nitra, Slovakia.

- Roman Catholic church records (births/marriages/deaths): 1733-1895 (parish A)
- Reformatted church records (births/marriages/deaths): 1784-1895 (parish B)

== See also ==
- List of municipalities and towns in Slovakia
