= Jesenské =

Jesenské may refer to several places in Slovakia.

- Jesenské, Levice District
- Jesenské, Rimavská Sobota District
