= Jesenské, Levice District =

Village and municipality in Slovakia

Jesenské Setétkút
- Municipality
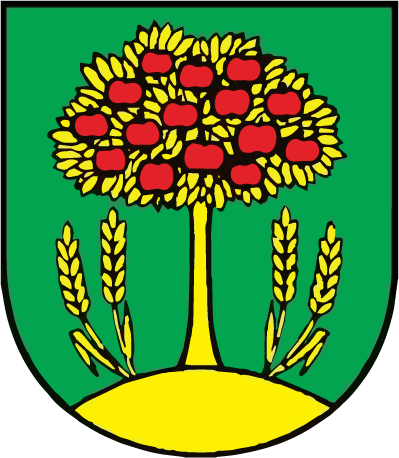
- Flag Coat of arms

- Location of Jesenské in the Nitra Region Location of Jesenské in Slovakia
- Coordinates: 48.16°N 18.41°E
- Country: Slovakia
- Region: Nitra Region
- District: Levice District
- First mentioned: 1292

Area
  - Total: 3.79 km^{2} (1.46 sq mi)
- Elevation: 177 m (581 ft)

Population (2025)
  - Total: 45
- Time zone: UTC+1 (CET)
  - Summer (DST): UTC+2 (CEST)
- Postal code: 935 36
- Area code: +421 36
- Vehicle registration plate (until 2022): LV
- Website: www.obecjesenske.sk

Jesenské (Hungarian: Setétkút) is a village and municipality in the Levice District in the Nitra Region of Slovakia.

== History ==
In historical records the village was first mentioned in 1292.

== Geography ==
The municipality lies at an altitude of 177 metres (581 ft) and covers an area of 3.79 km^{2} (1.46 sq mi) (2025).

== Population ==
Population statistic (10 years)
Year	1995	2005	2015	2025
Count	49	55	48	45
Difference		+12.24%	−12.72%	−6.25%

Population statistic
Year	2024	2025
Count	44	45
Difference		+2.27%

It has a population of 45 people (31 December 2025).

=== Ethnicity ===
Census 2021 (1+ %)
Ethnicity	Number	Fraction
Slovak	45	91.83%
Not found out	2	4.08%
Czech	1	2.04%
Hungarian	1	2.04%
Total	49	

In year 2021 was 49 people by ethnicity 45 as Slovak, 2 as Not found out, 1 as Czech and 1 as Hungarian.

Note on population: The difference values of population numbers in the table "Population statistic" and in the sections "Ethnicity" & "Religion" is caused by the use of various statistical methods.

=== Religion ===
Census 2021 (1+ %)
Religion	Number	Fraction
Roman Catholic Church	27	55.1%
None	16	32.65%
Not found out	2	4.08%
Evangelical Church	2	4.08%
Calvinist Church	1	2.04%
Other	1	2.04%
Total	49	

In year 2021 was 49 people by religion 27 from Roman Catholic Church, 16 from None, 2 from Not found out, 2 from Evangelical Church, 1 from Calvinist Church and 1 from Other.

== Genealogical resources ==
The records for genealogical research are available at the state archive "Statny Archiv in Nitra, Slovakia"

- Roman Catholic church records (births/marriages/deaths): 1733-1895 (parish B)

== See also ==
- List of municipalities and towns in Slovakia
