= Ecser =

- Large village
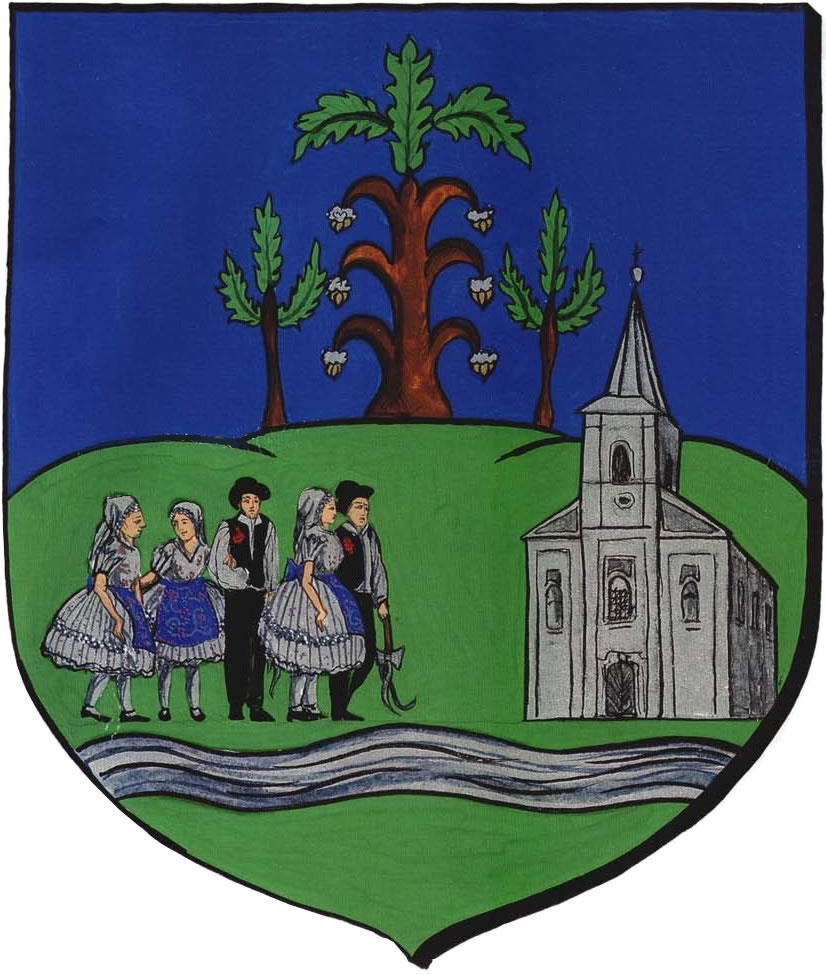
- Coat of arms

- Location of Ecser
- Coordinates: 47.44437°N 19.32605°E
- Country: Hungary
- County: Pest
- District: Vecsés

Area
  - Total: 13.1 km^{2} (5.1 sq mi)

Population (2007)
  - Total: 3,471
  - Density: 248.05/km^{2} (642.4/sq mi)
- Time zone: UTC+1 (CET)
  - Summer (DST): UTC+2 (CEST)
- Postal code: 2233
- Area code: (+36) 29

Ecser (Hungarian: [ˈɛt͡ʃɛr]; Slovak: Ečer) is a village in Pest county, Budapest metropolitan area, Hungary.

== Situation ==
Ecser is situated southeast from Budapest, near Ferihegy International Airport. The neighbouring settlements are Maglód, Vecsés, Gyömrő and Üllő. The M0 motorway runs near the village. The village is situated on the railway-line 120a (Budapest-Újszász-Szolnok). It has a Slovak minority population.

== History ==
The first written account of Ecser is from December 15, 1315, although the village already existed as of 896, when the Magyars arrived into their present-day country. According to one legend, the name of the village was given by Grand Prince Árpád of the Hungarian tribes. When he asked the name of the settlement where he stopped to have a little rest, the local people could not tell him the name, so Árpád said them: call this place after this ‘oak’ (Hungarian cser). During the period of Ottoman Turkish dominance (1526–1686) the village died out, particularly after the siege of nearby Buda. The inhabitants returned only in 1699. Eleven soldiers from Ecser fought in Rákóczi's War for Independence (1703–1711). In the early 18th century years the owner of the village, Count Antal Grassalkovich brought in Slovak settlers.

== Notable ==
The largest monument in the village is the Roman Catholic church from 1740.

In the village there is a world-famous folk dance called ‘Wedding at Ecser’ (Ecseri lakodalmas).

On the coat of arms is seen the church, the folk dance and the oak tree, the three most important sign of the village.

== Notable people ==
- Zoltán Trepák (*1977), basketball player

== Gallery ==
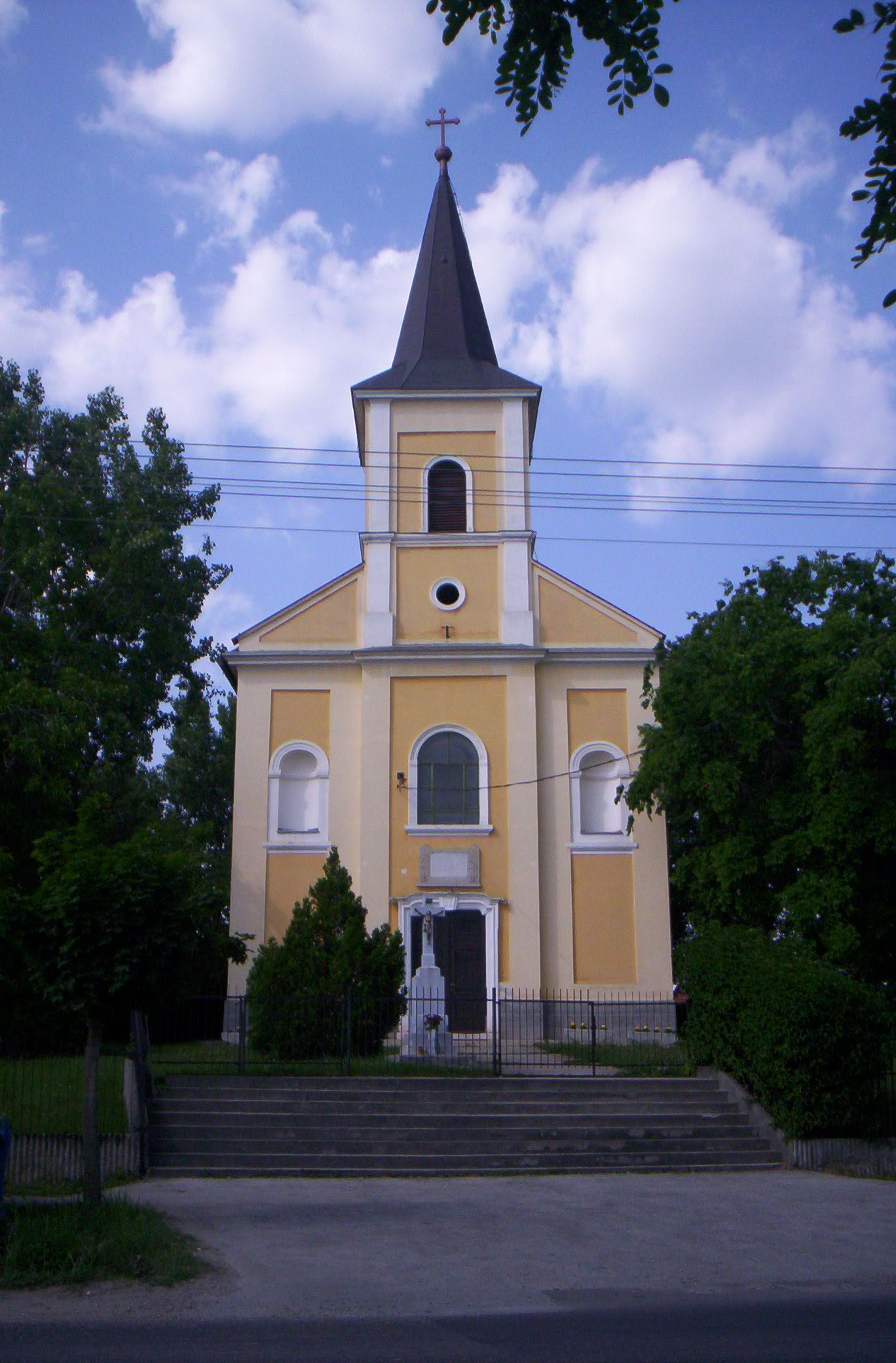
The Catholic church of Ecser

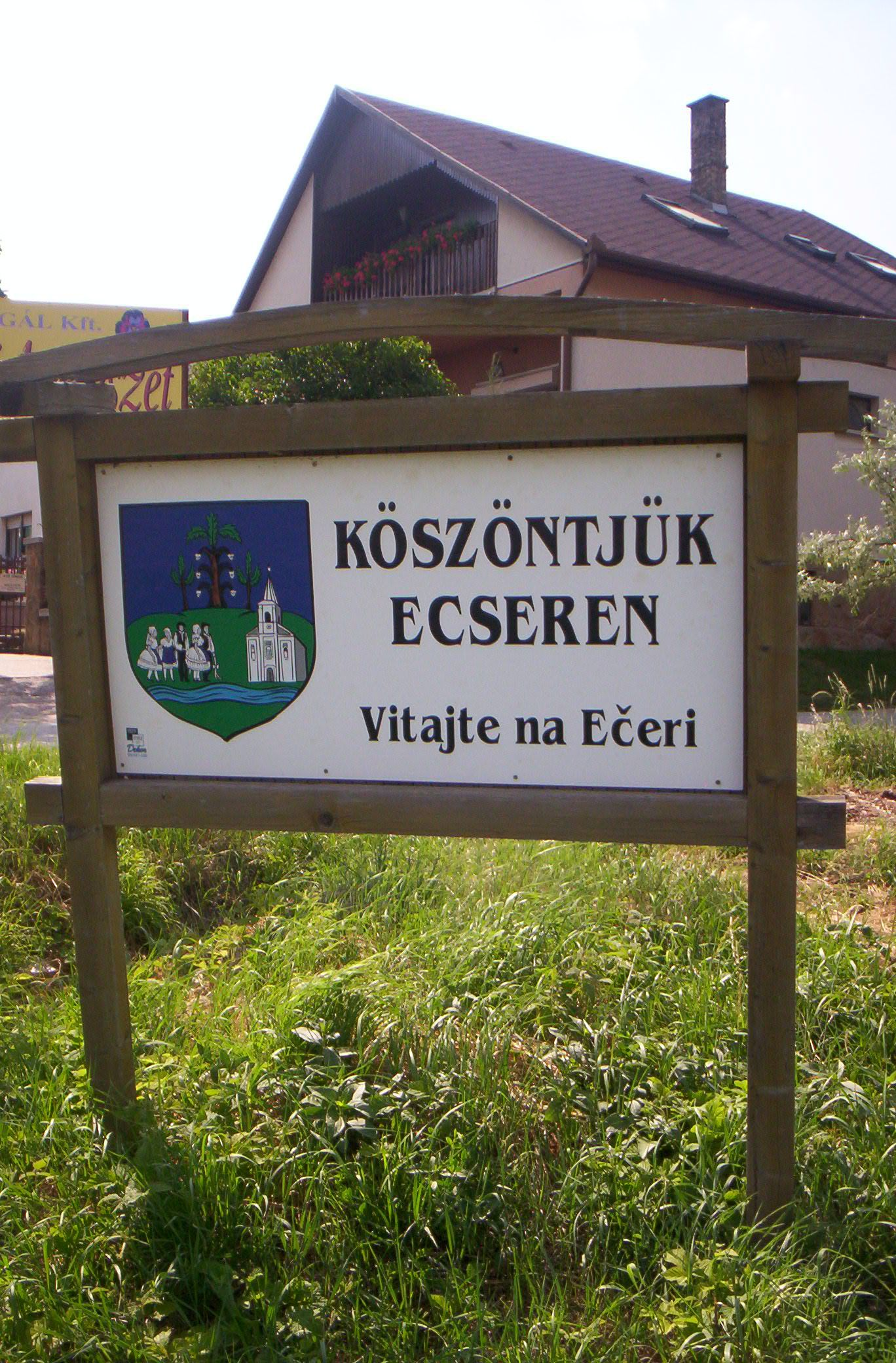
A bilingual welcome-sign on the border of Ecser

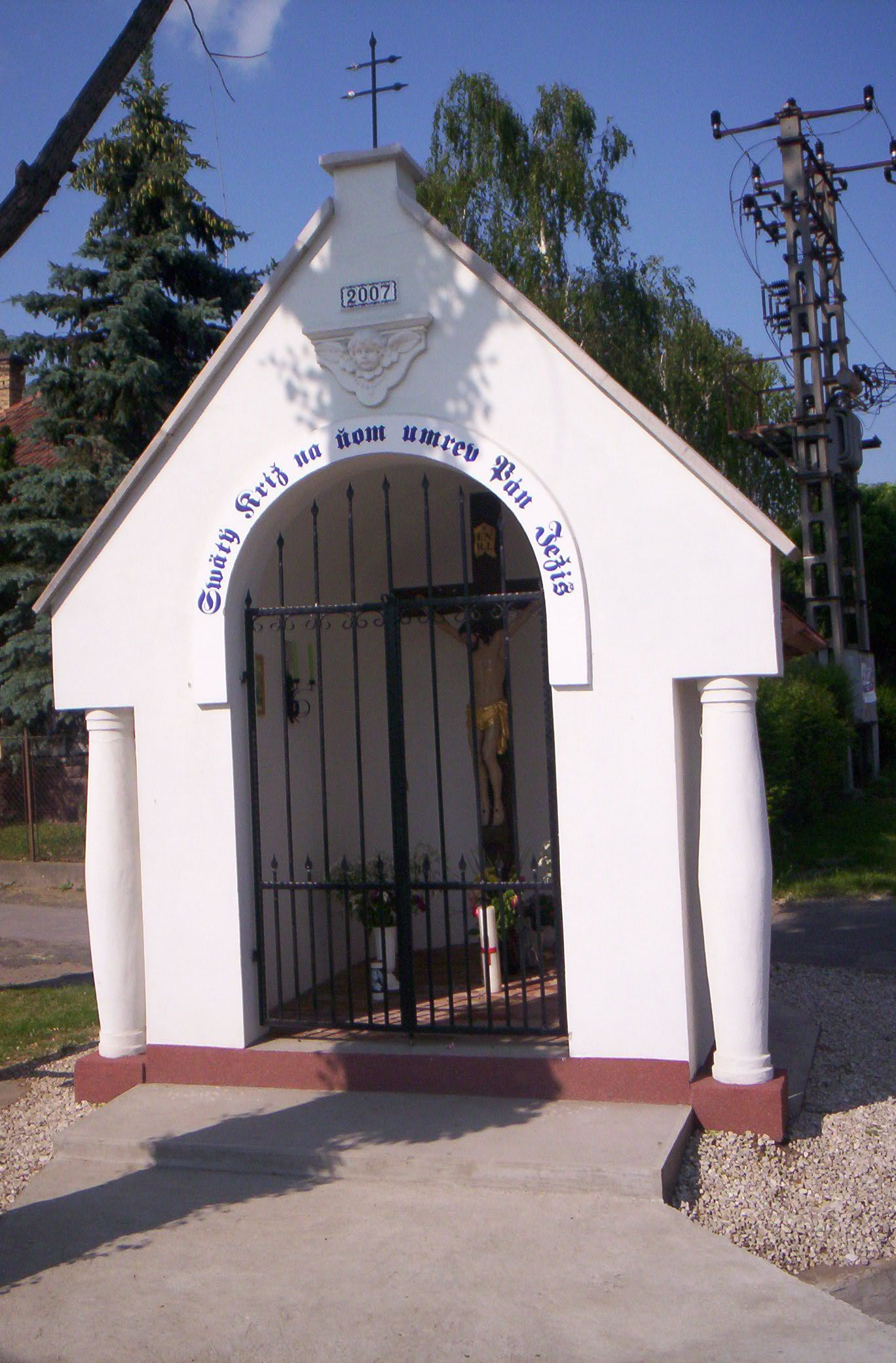
The Slovak chapel

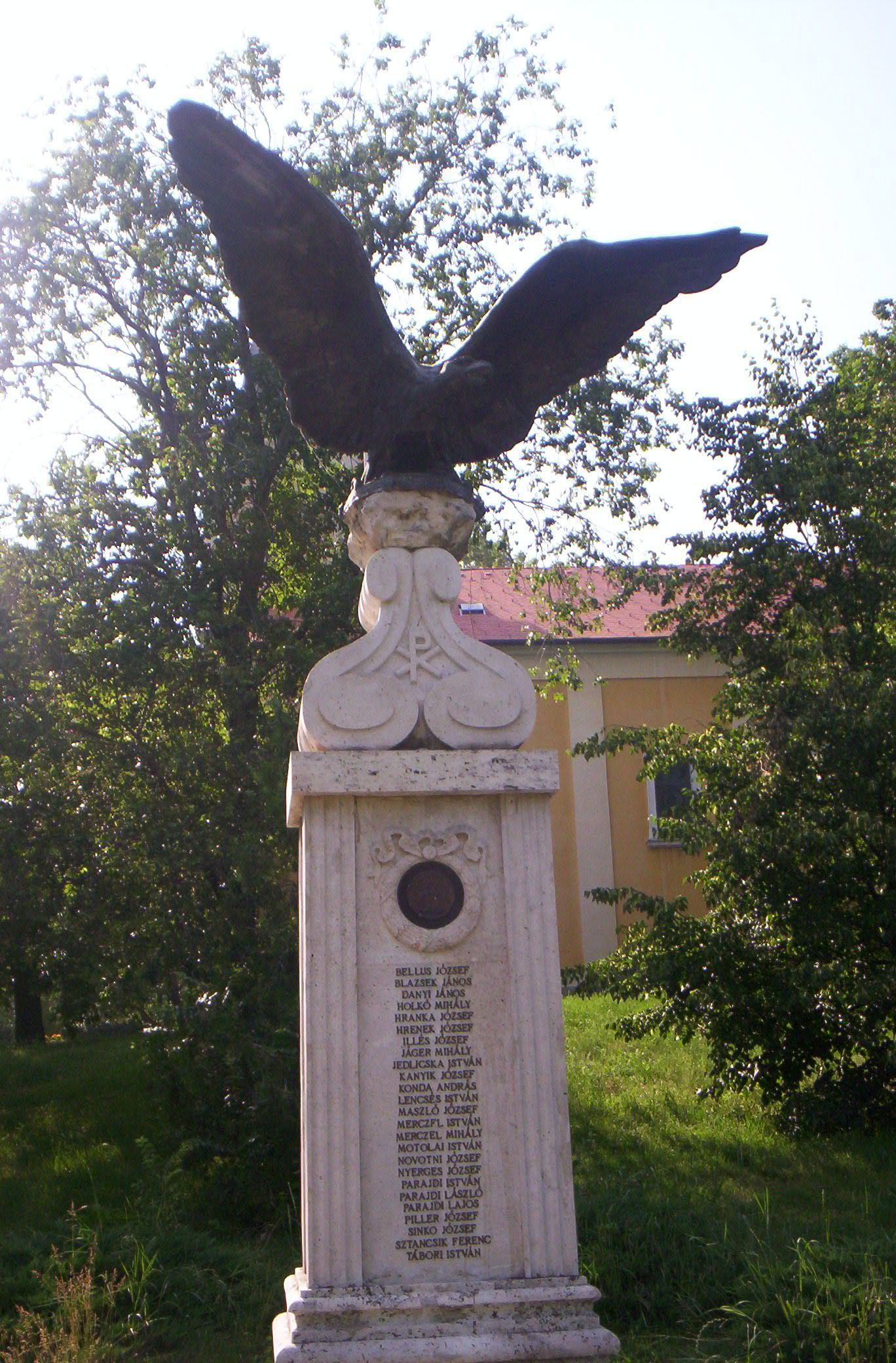
The monument of the Second World War

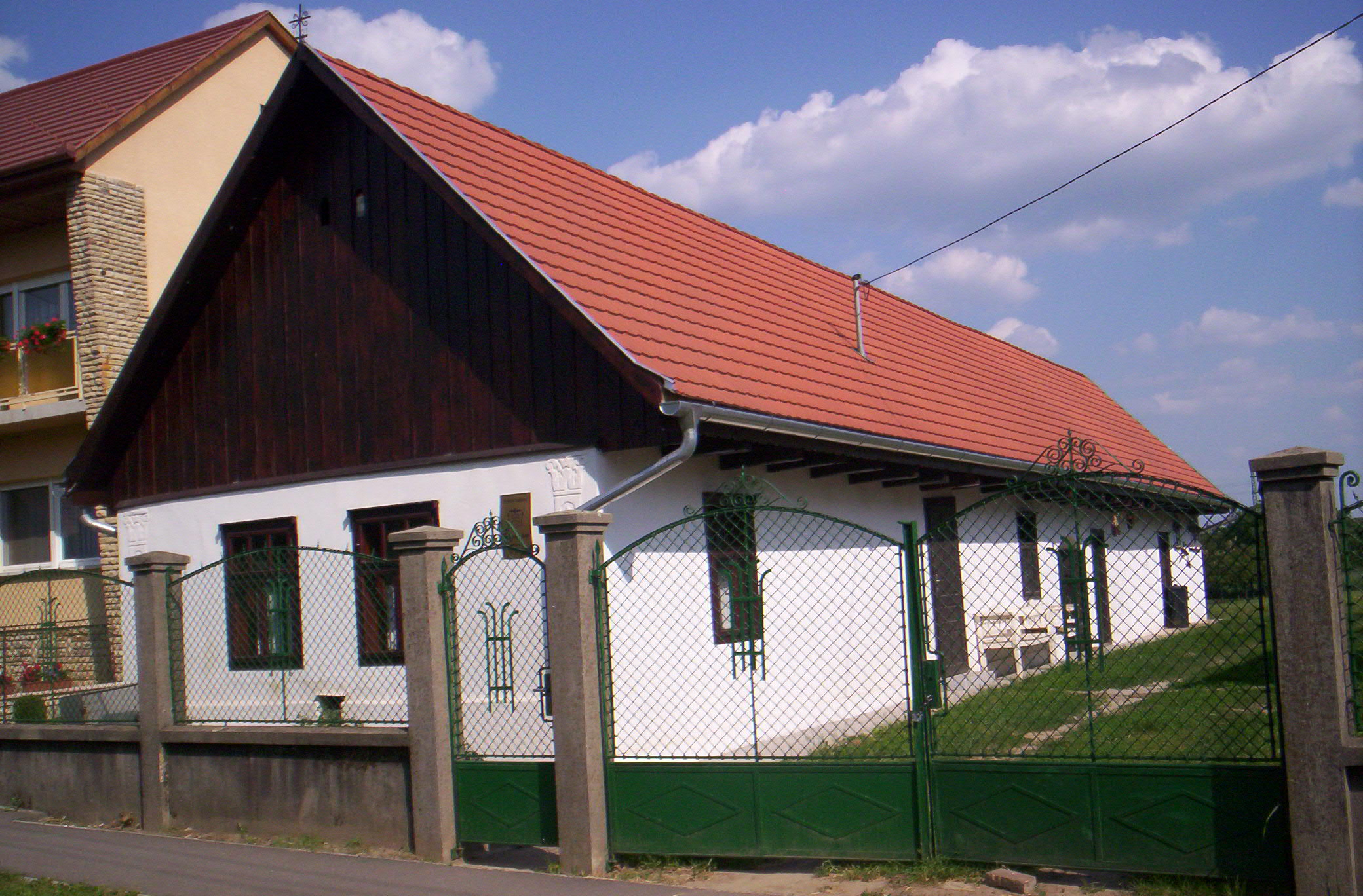
The historical house of Ecser

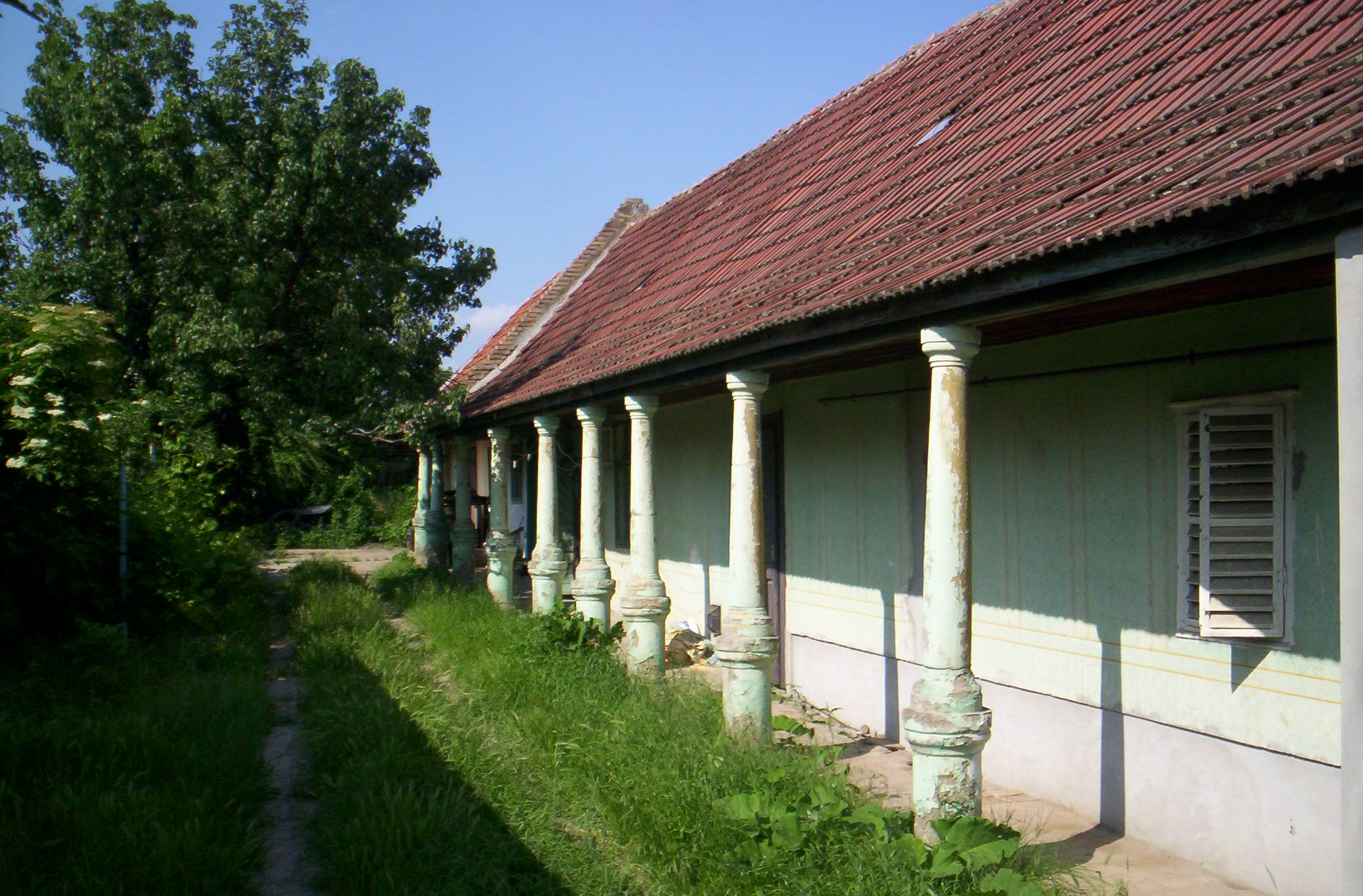
Court of an old house

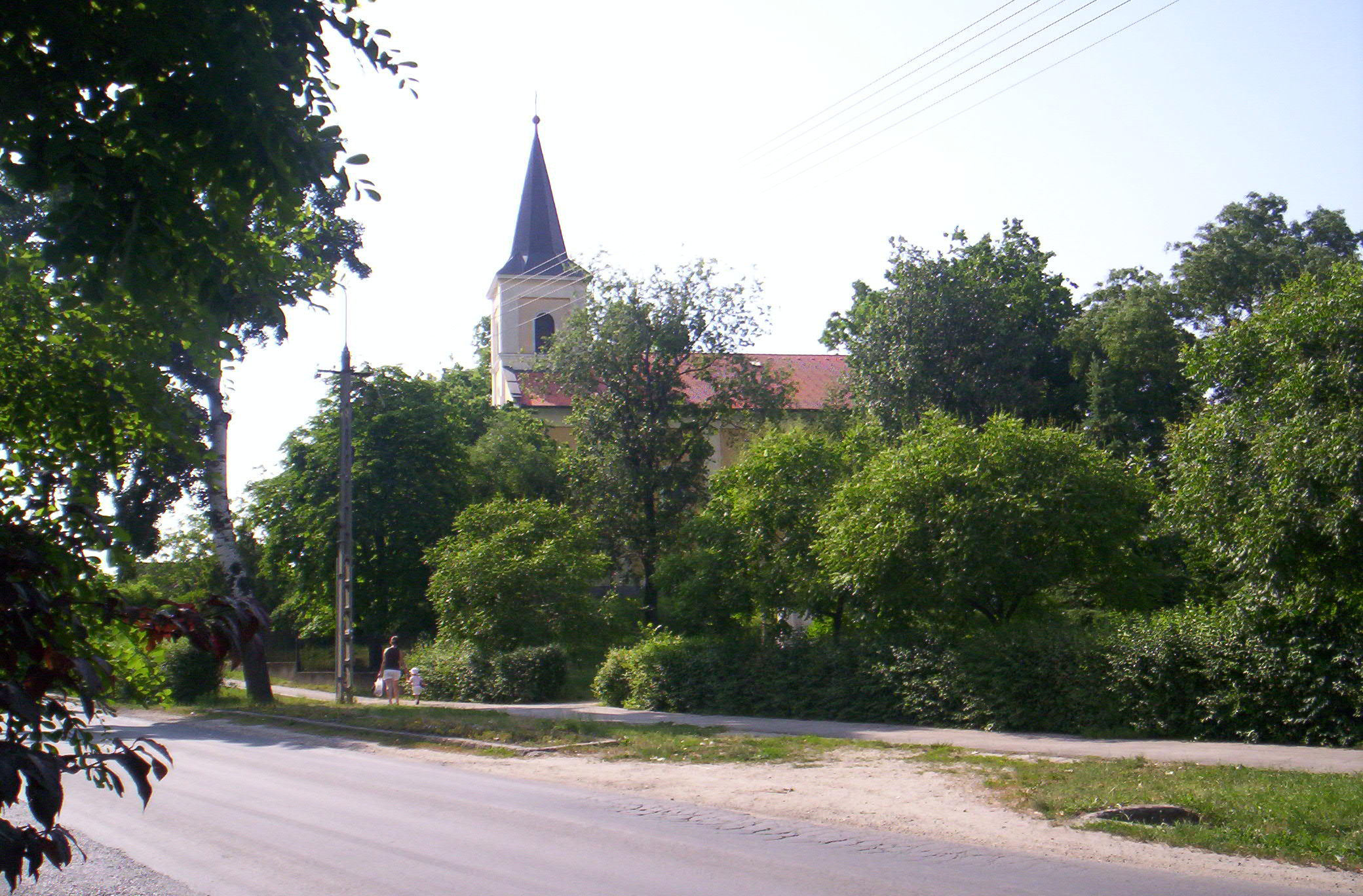
The park with the church

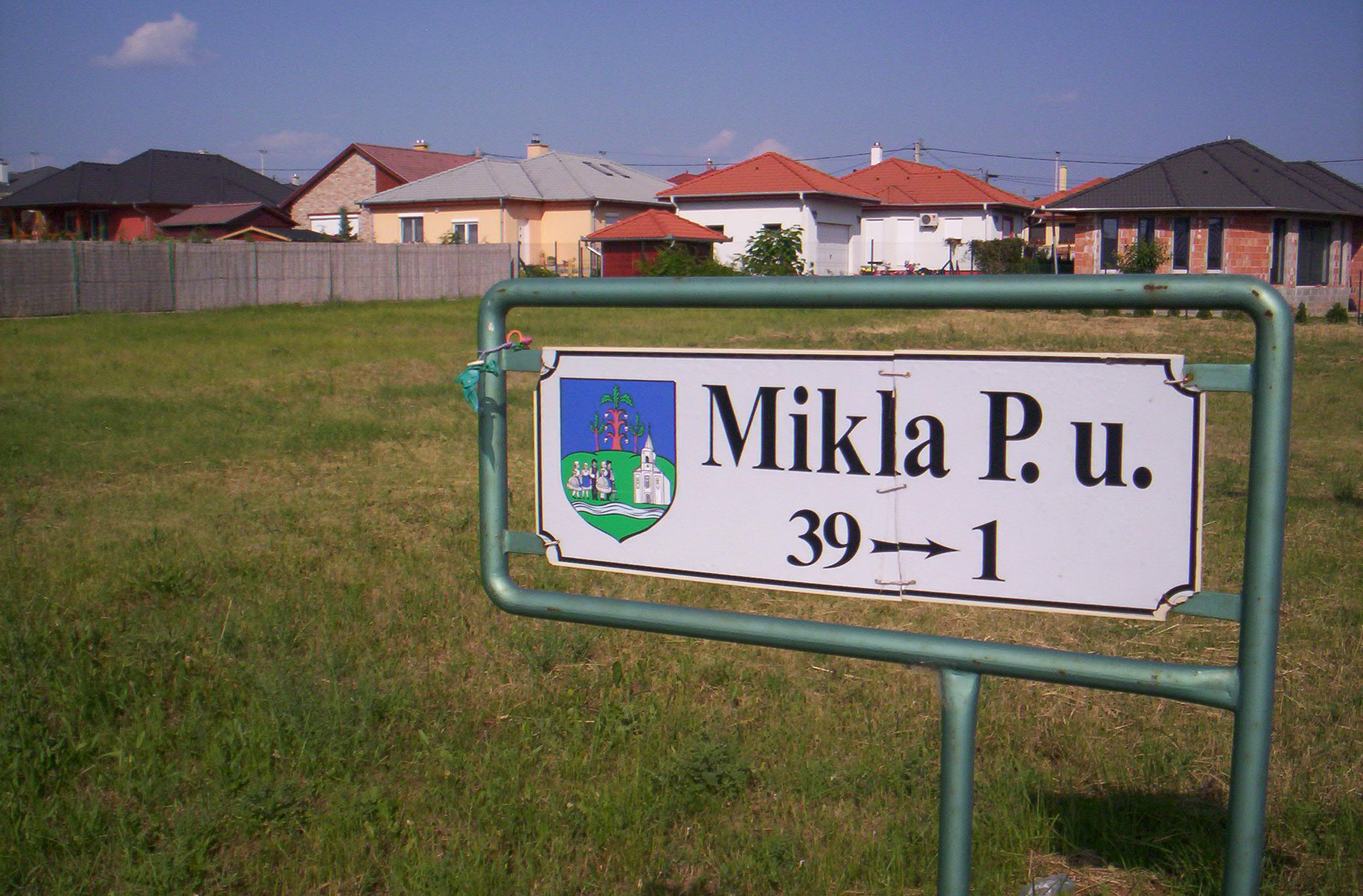
A streetname-table in the Kálvária Hill

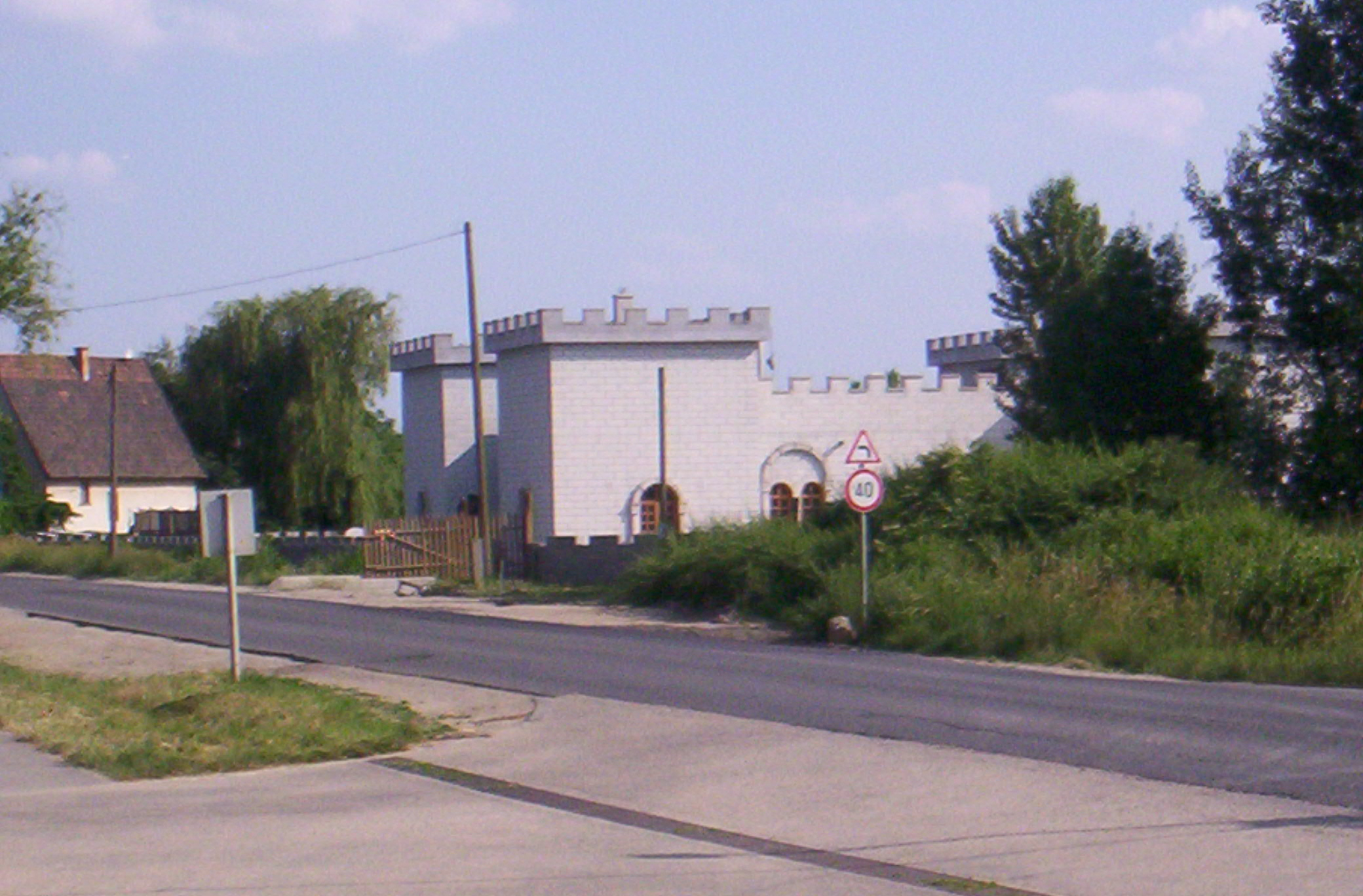
The "burg" of Ecser, playhouse for children

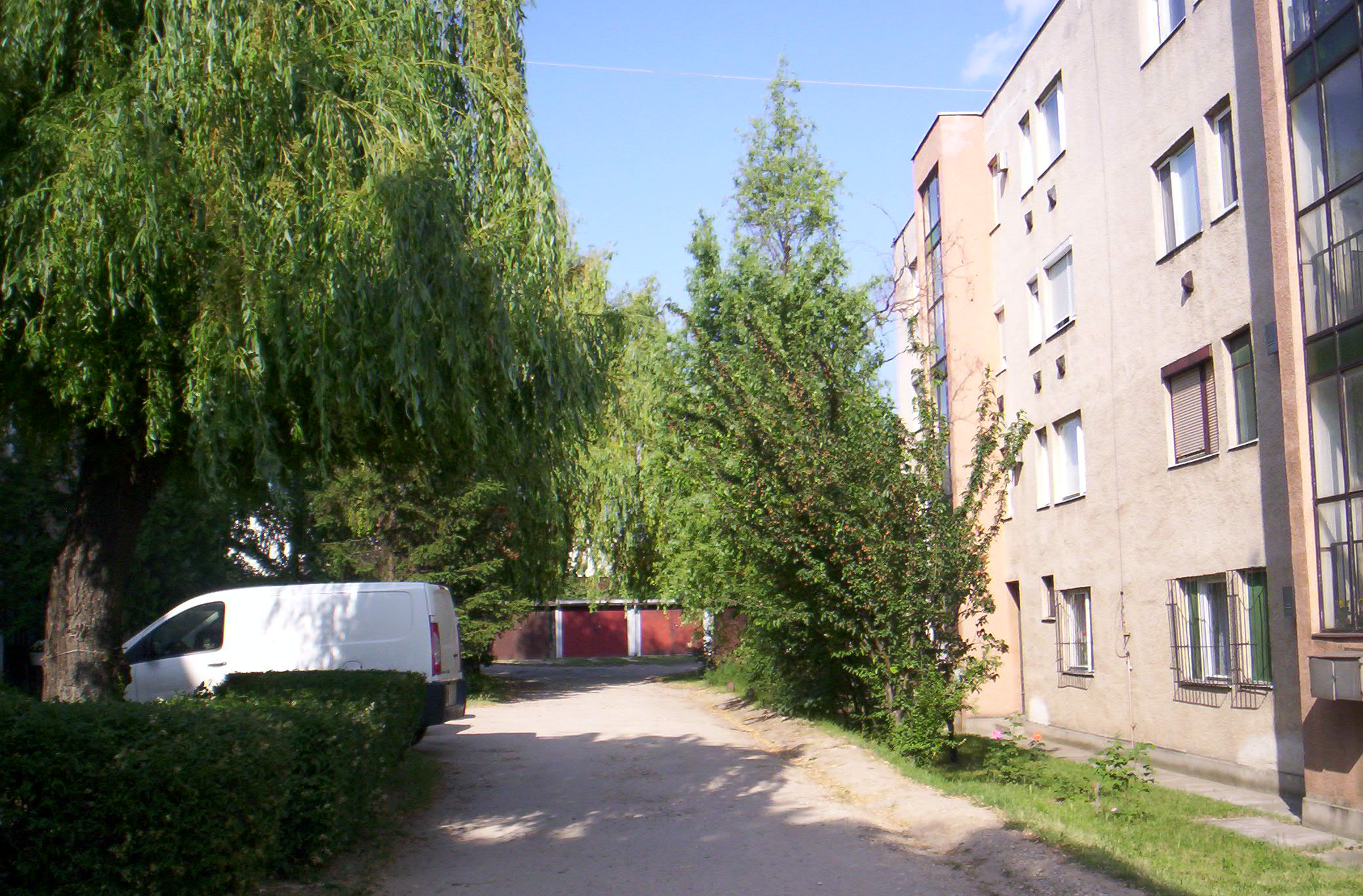
Some block house in Ecser

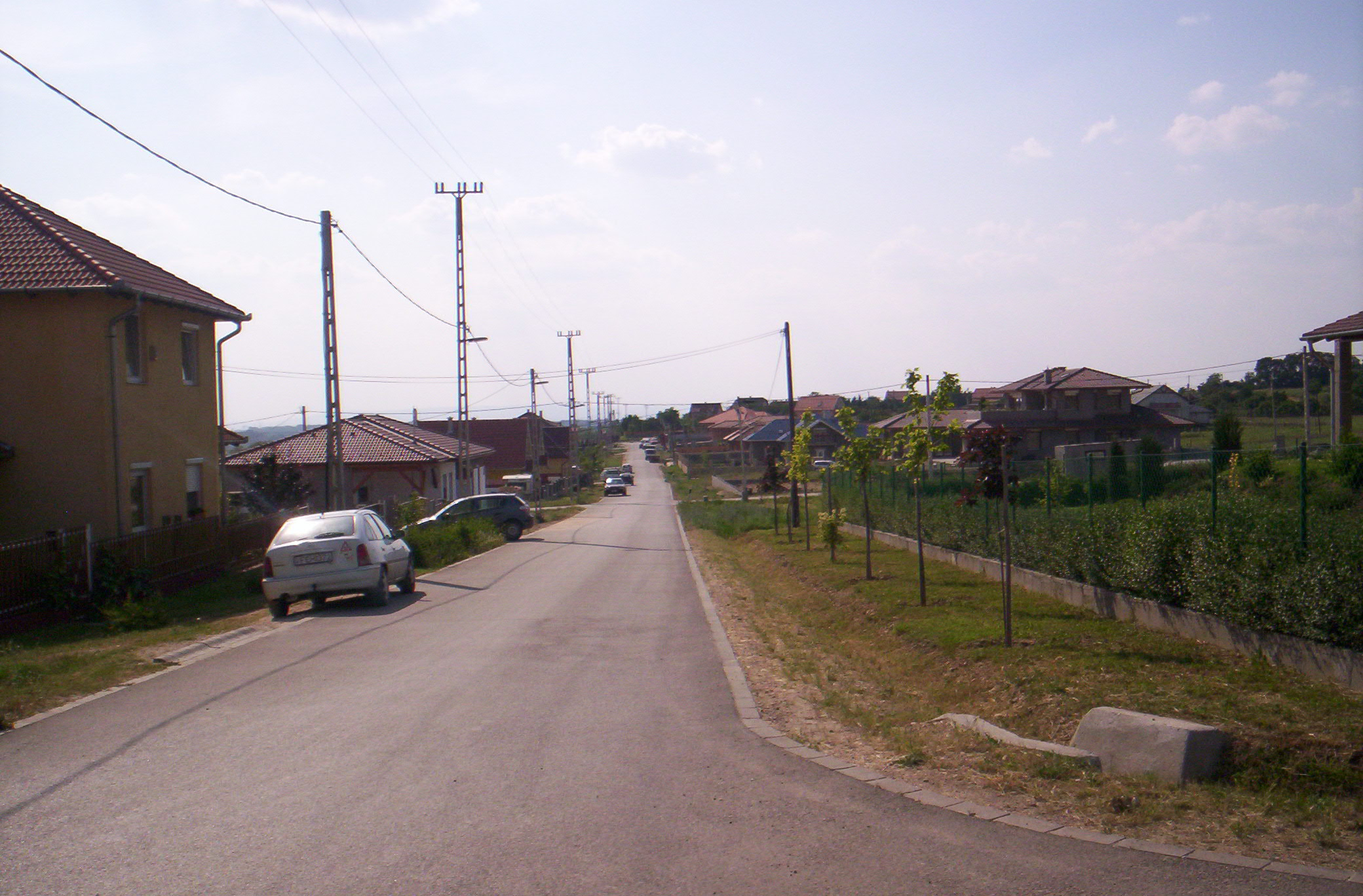
The newest part of Ecser, the Kálvária Hill

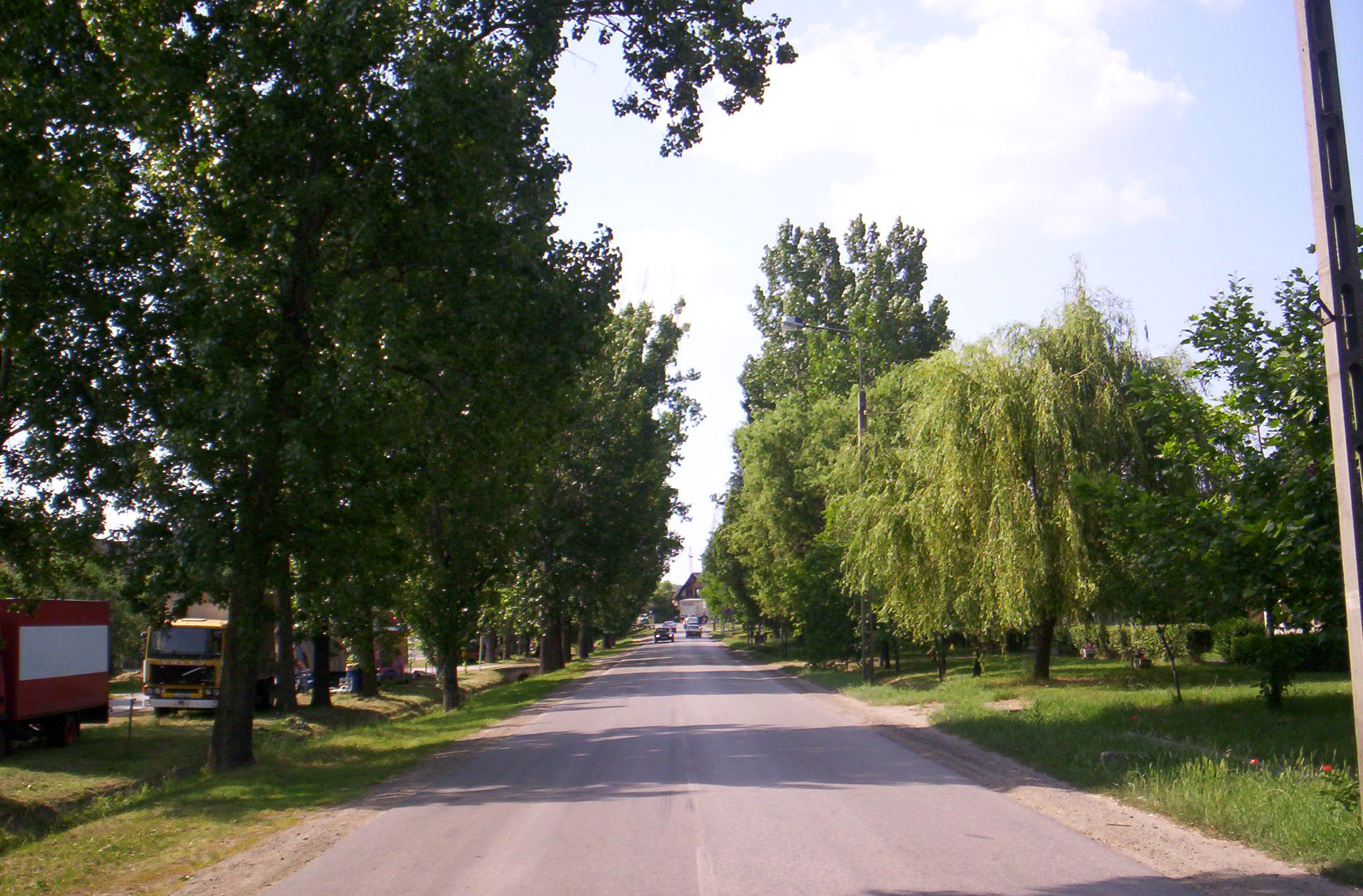
The main street, Széchenyi utca
