= Vecsés District =

Vecsés District Vecsési járás
- Districts of Hungary
- Coat of arms

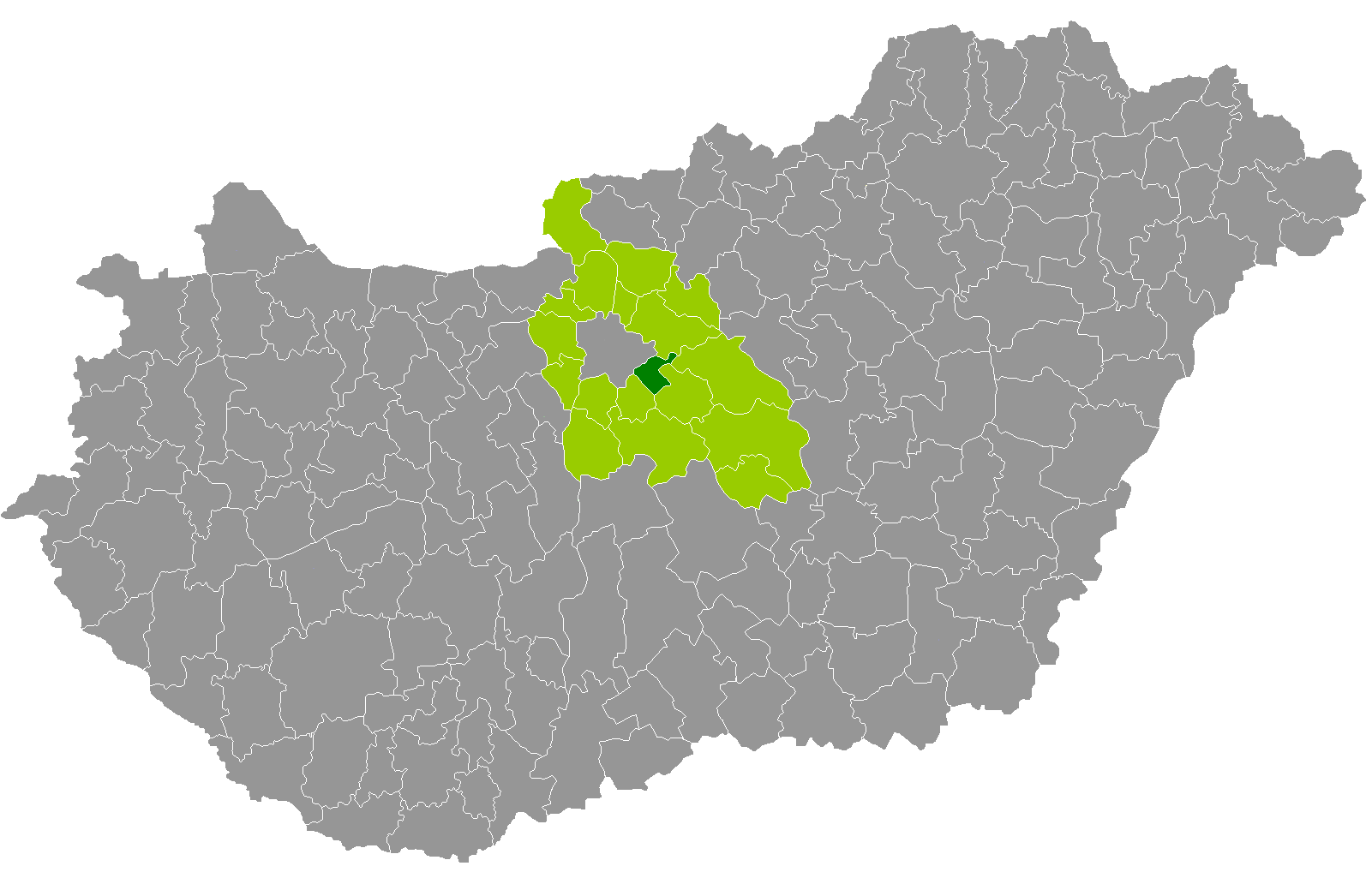
- Vecsés District within Hungary and Pest County.
- Coordinates: 47.41°N 19.26°E
- Country: Hungary
- County: Pest
- District seat: Vecsés

Area
  - Total: 119.74 km^{2} (46.23 sq mi)
  - Rank: 17th in Pest

Population (2011 census)
  - Total: 47,026
  - Rank: 13th in Pest
  - Density: 393/km^{2} (1,020/sq mi)

Vecsés (Hungarian: Vecsési járás) is a district in central part of Pest County. Vecsés is also the name of the town where the district seat is found. The district is located in the Central Hungary Statistical Region.

== Geography ==
Vecsés District borders with Gödöllő District to the north, Nagykáta District to the northeast, Monor District to the southeast, Gyál District to the southwest, Budapest to the northwest. The number of the inhabited places in Vecsés District is 4.

== Municipalities ==
The district has 3 towns and 1 large village. (ordered by population, as of 1 January 2013)

- Ecser (3,624)
- **Maglód** (11,753)
- **Üllő** (11,585)
- **Vecsés** (20,164) – district seat

The bolded municipalities are cities, italics municipality is large village.

== Demographics ==
Religion in Vecsés District (2011 census)
1. Catholic Church (32.0%)
2. Greek Catholicism (0.80%)
3. Calvinism (11.4%)
4. Lutheranism (3.00%)
5. Other religions (2.00%)
6. Non-religious (17.4%)
7. Atheists (1.40%)
8. Undeclared (32.0%)

In 2011, it had a population of 47,026 and the population density was 393/km^{2}.

Year	County population	Change
2011	47,026	n/a

=== Ethnicity ===
Besides the Hungarian majority, the main minorities are the German (approx. 1,300), Roma (450), Slovak (350) and Romanian (300).

Total population (2011 census): 47,026
Ethnic groups (2011 census): Identified themselves: 43,405 persons:

- Hungarians: 40,264 (92.76%)
- Germans: 1,338 (3.08%)
- Gypsies: 469 (1.08%)
- Others and indefinable: 1,334 (3.07%)

Approx. 3,500 persons in Vecsés District did not declare their ethnic group at the 2011 census.

=== Religion ===
Religious adherence in the county according to 2011 census:

- Catholic – 15,439 (Roman Catholic – 15,037; Greek Catholic – 395);
- Reformed – 5,349;
- Evangelical – 1,397;
- other religions – 945;
- Non-religious – 8,202;
- Atheism – 663;
- Undeclared – 15,031.

== Gallery ==
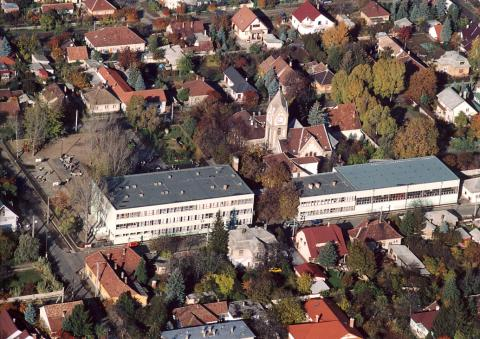
Downtown of Vecsés

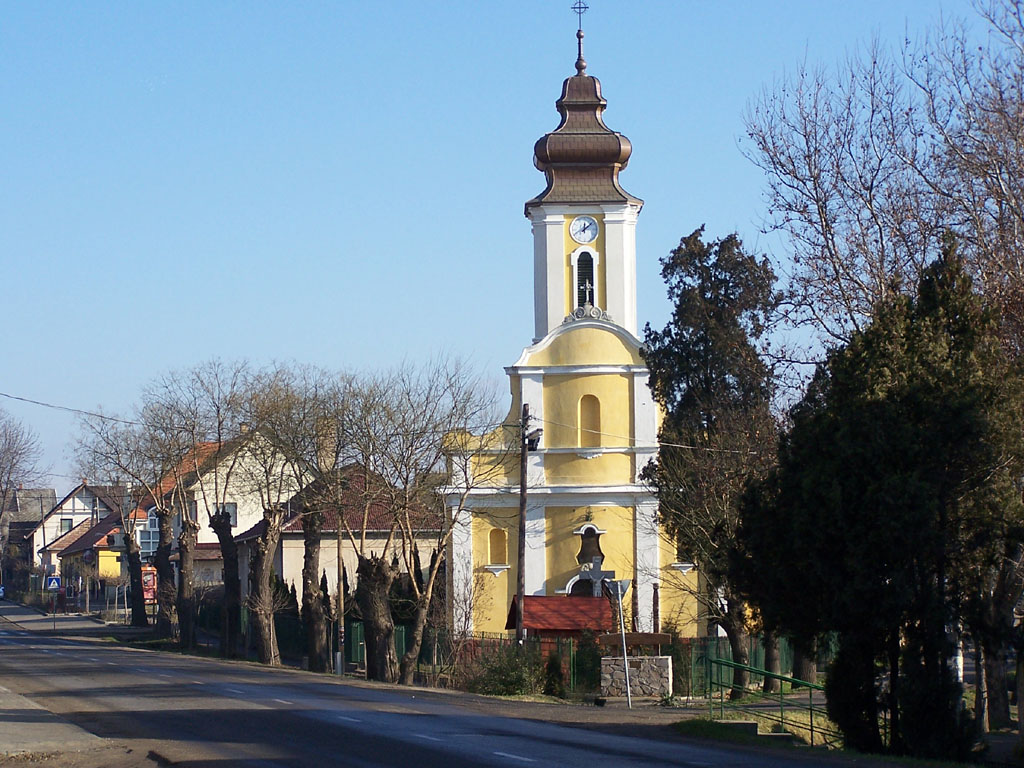
Queen of the Rosary Church in Maglód

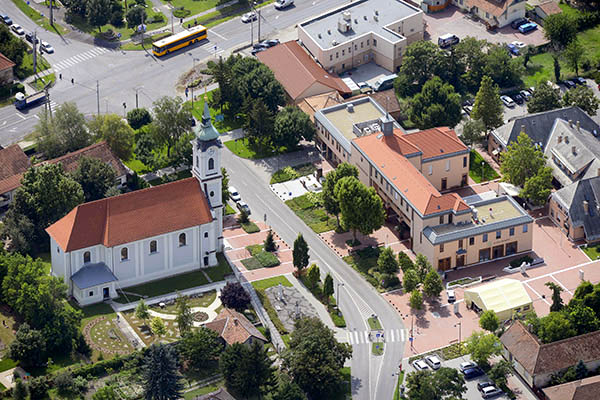
Aerial view of Üllő

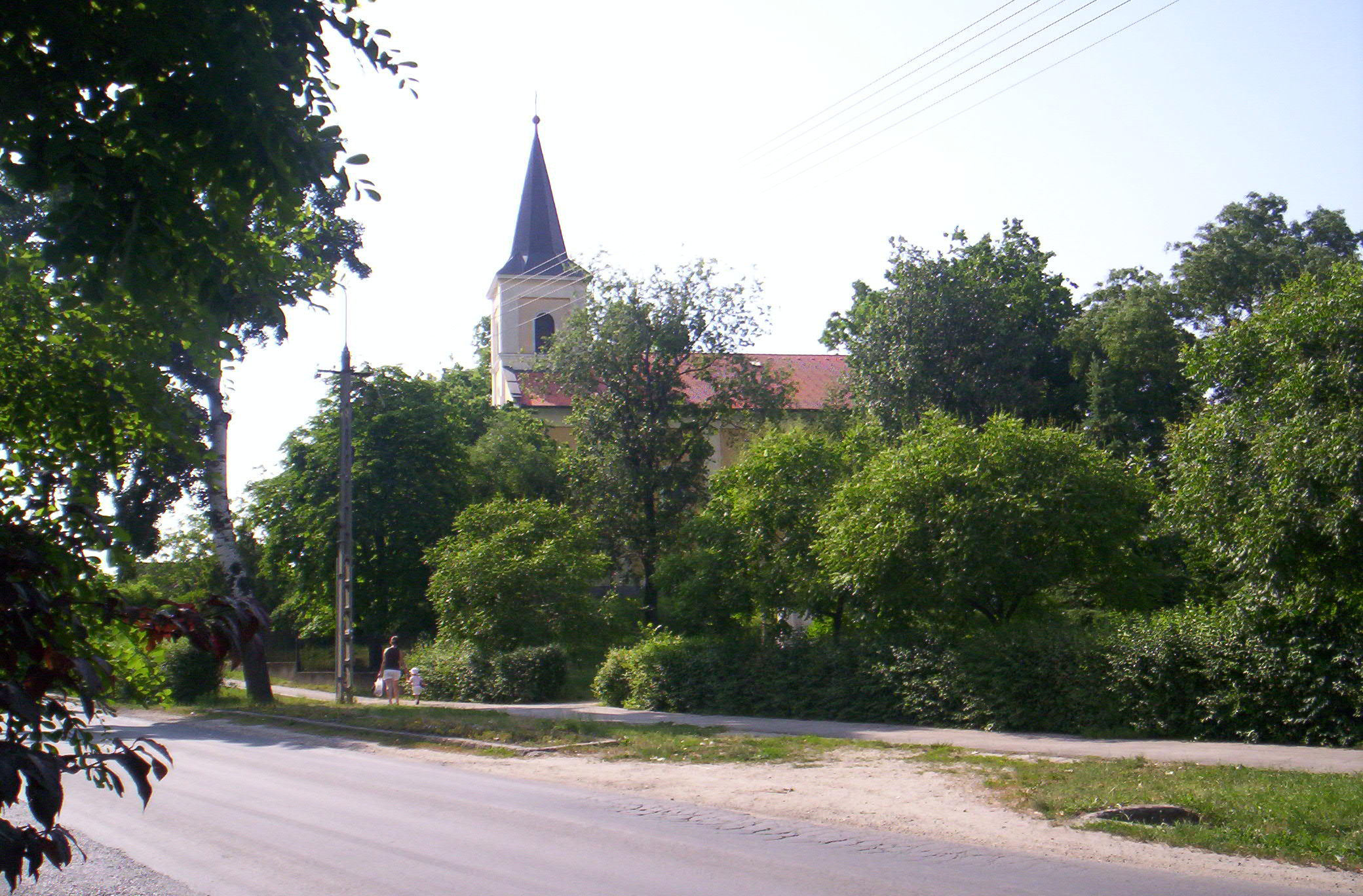
Center of Ecser with the church

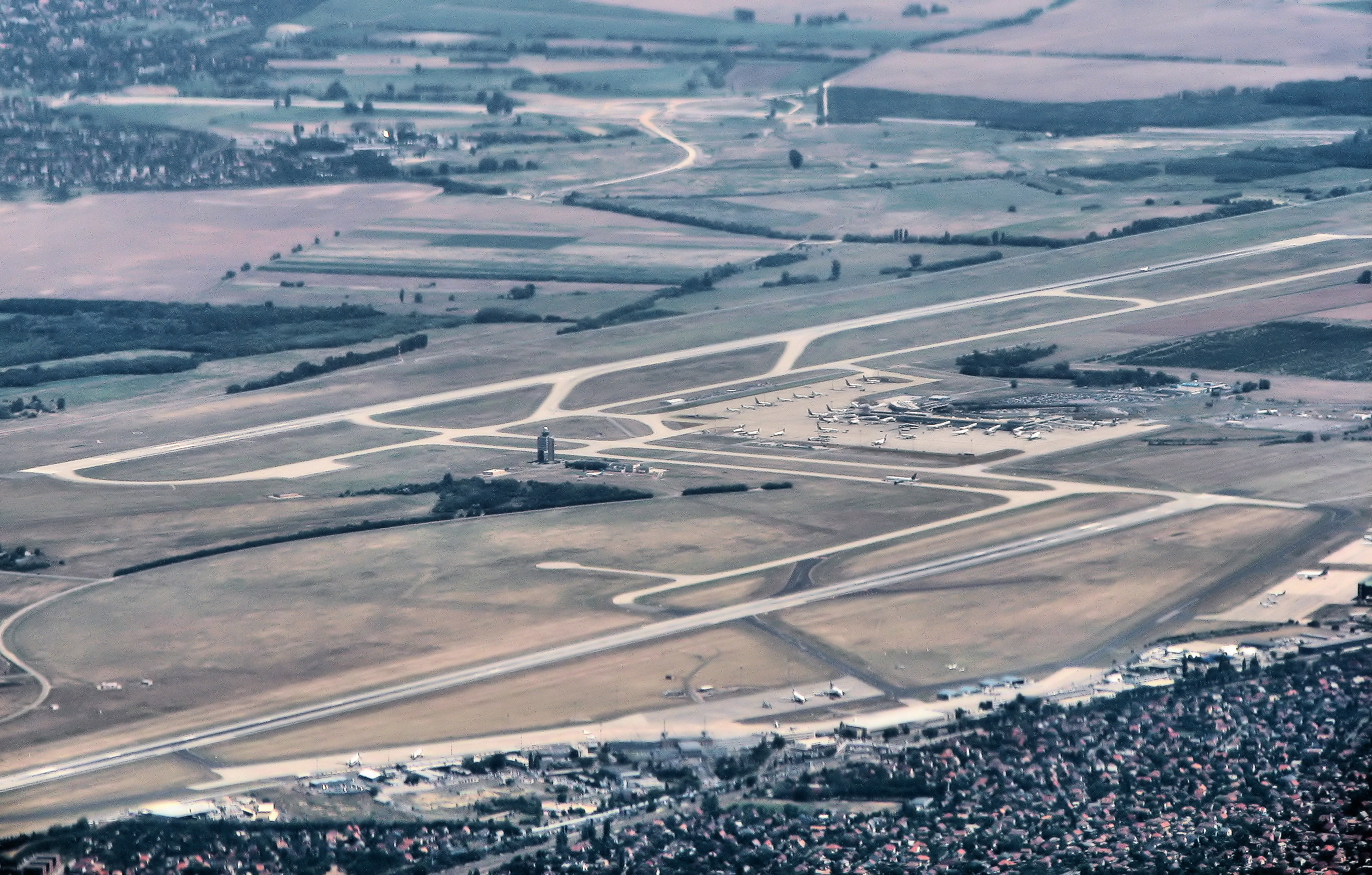
Budapest Ferenc Liszt International Airport

== See also ==
- List of cities and towns in Hungary
