= Érd District =

Coordinates: 47.38793695754635°N 18.910146909349486°E

Érd District Érdi járás
- Districts of Hungary
- Coat of arms

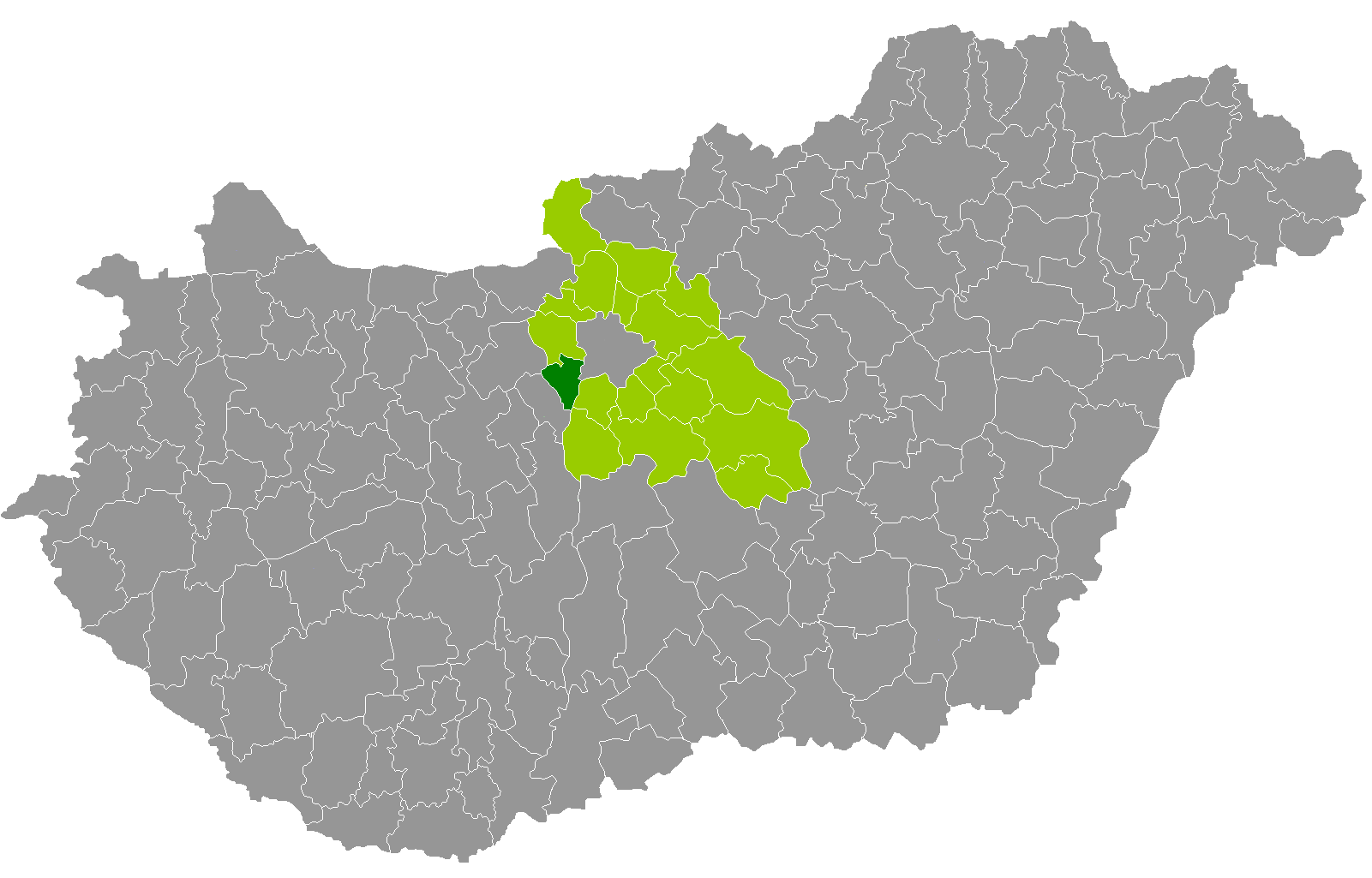
- Érd District within Hungary and Pest County.
- Country: Hungary
- County: Pest
- District seat: Érd

Area
  - Total: 184.29 km^{2} (71.15 sq mi)
  - Rank: 14th in Pest

Population (2011 census)
  - Total: 116,510
  - Rank: 2nd in Pest
  - Density: 632/km^{2} (1,640/sq mi)

Érd (Hungarian: Érdi járás) is a district in south-western part of Pest County. Érd is also the name of the town where the district seat is found. The district is located in the Central Hungary Statistical Region.

== Geography ==
Érd District borders with Budakeszi District to the north, Budapest and Szigetszentmiklós District to the east, Ráckeve District to the south, Martonvásár District (Fejér County) to the southwest, Bicske District (Fejér County) to the northwest. The number of the inhabited places in Érd District is 7.

== Municipalities ==
The district has 1 urban county, 3 towns, 1 large village and 2 villages. (ordered by population, as of 1 January 2013)

- **Diósd** (9,235)
- **Érd** (63,333) – district seat
- Pusztazámor (1,156)
- Sóskút (3,100)
- **Százhalombatta** (18,577)
- Tárnok (8,888)
- **Törökbálint** (13,015)

The bolded municipalities are cities, italics municipality is large village.

== Demographics ==
Religion in Érd District (2011 census)
1. Catholic Church (30.2%)
2. Greek Catholicism (0.90%)
3. Calvinism (8.80%)
4. Lutheranism (1.20%)
5. Orthodoxy (0.20%)
6. Other religions (2.50%)
7. Non-religious (21.1%)
8. Atheists (2.20%)
9. Undeclared (32.9%)

In 2011, it had a population of 116,510 and the population density was 632/km².

Year	County population	Change
2011	116,510	n/a

=== Ethnicity ===
Besides the Hungarian majority, the main minorities are the German (approx. 2,000), Roma (900), Romanian (700), Slovak (350), Russian (200), Serb, Croat and Greek (150), Polish (100).

Total population (2011 census): 116,510
Ethnic groups (2011 census): Identified themselves: 104,800 persons:

- Hungarians: 98,053 (93.56%)
- Germans: 2,000 (1.91%)
- Others and indefinable: 4,747 (4.53%)

Approx. 11,500 persons in Érd District did not declare their ethnic group at the 2011 census.

=== Religion ===
Religious adherence in the county according to 2011 census:

- Catholic – 36,241 (Roman Catholic – 35,197; Greek Catholic – 1,026);
- Reformed – 10,218;
- Evangelical – 1,375;
- Orthodox – 239;
- other religions – 2,890;
- Non-religious – 24,630;
- Atheism – 2,585;
- Undeclared – 38,332.

== Gallery ==
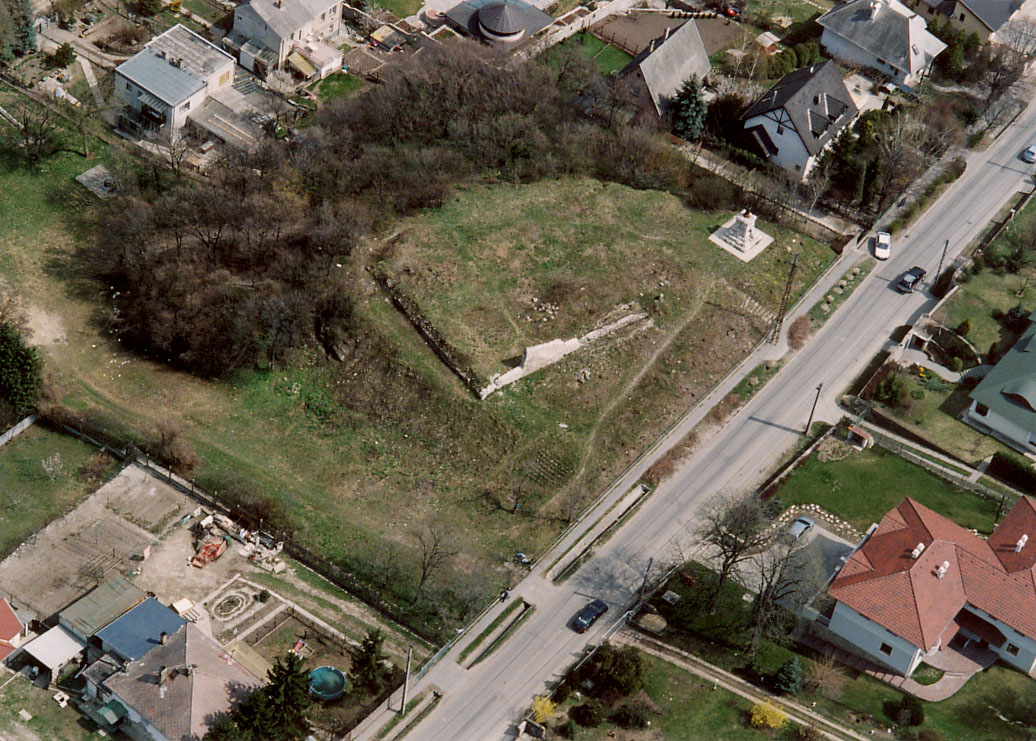
Ruin of Hunting lodge in Érd

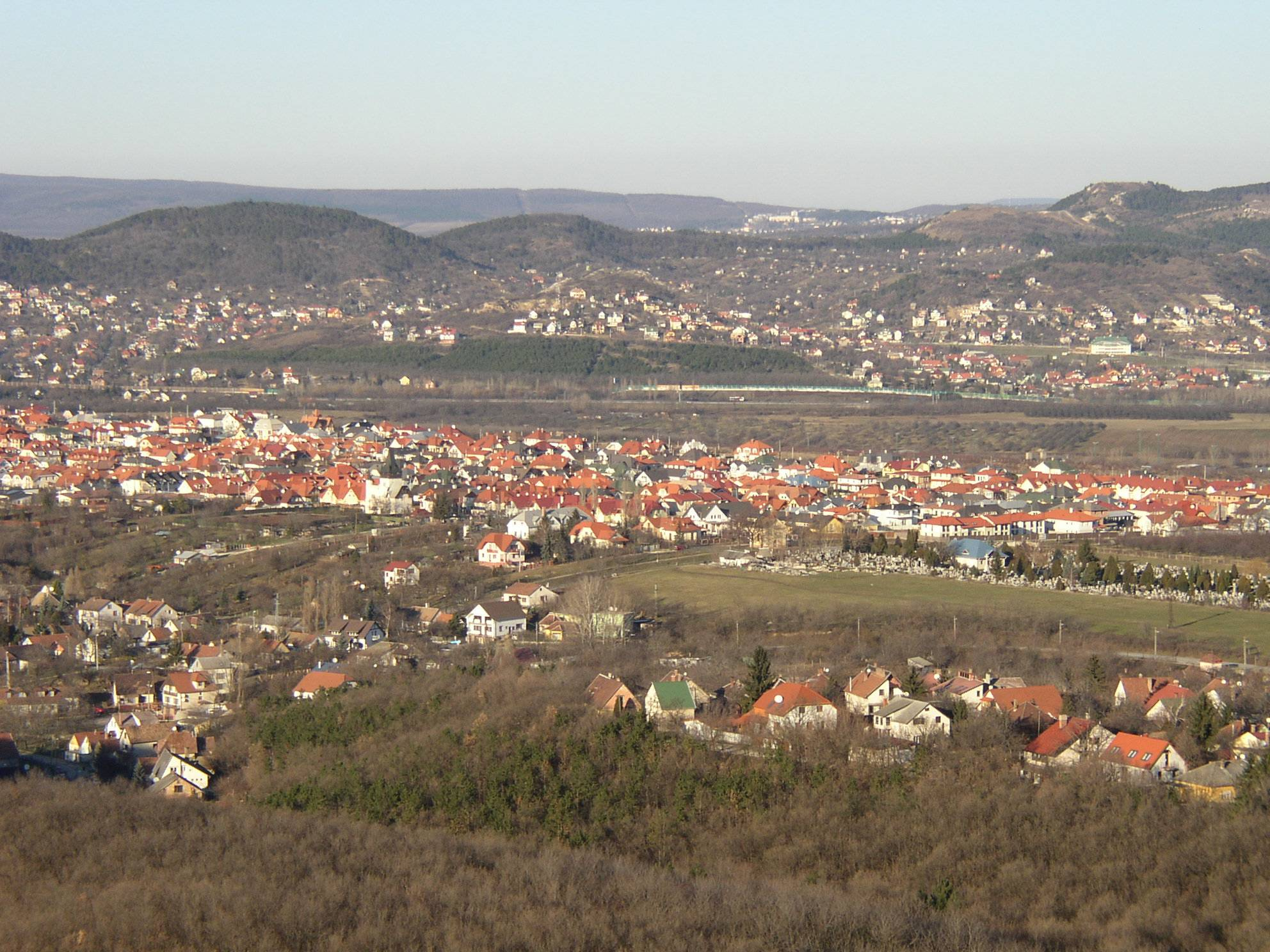
Aerial view of Törökbálint

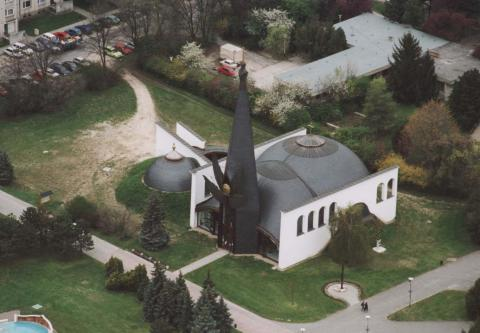
St.Stephen of Hungary Church in Százhalombatta

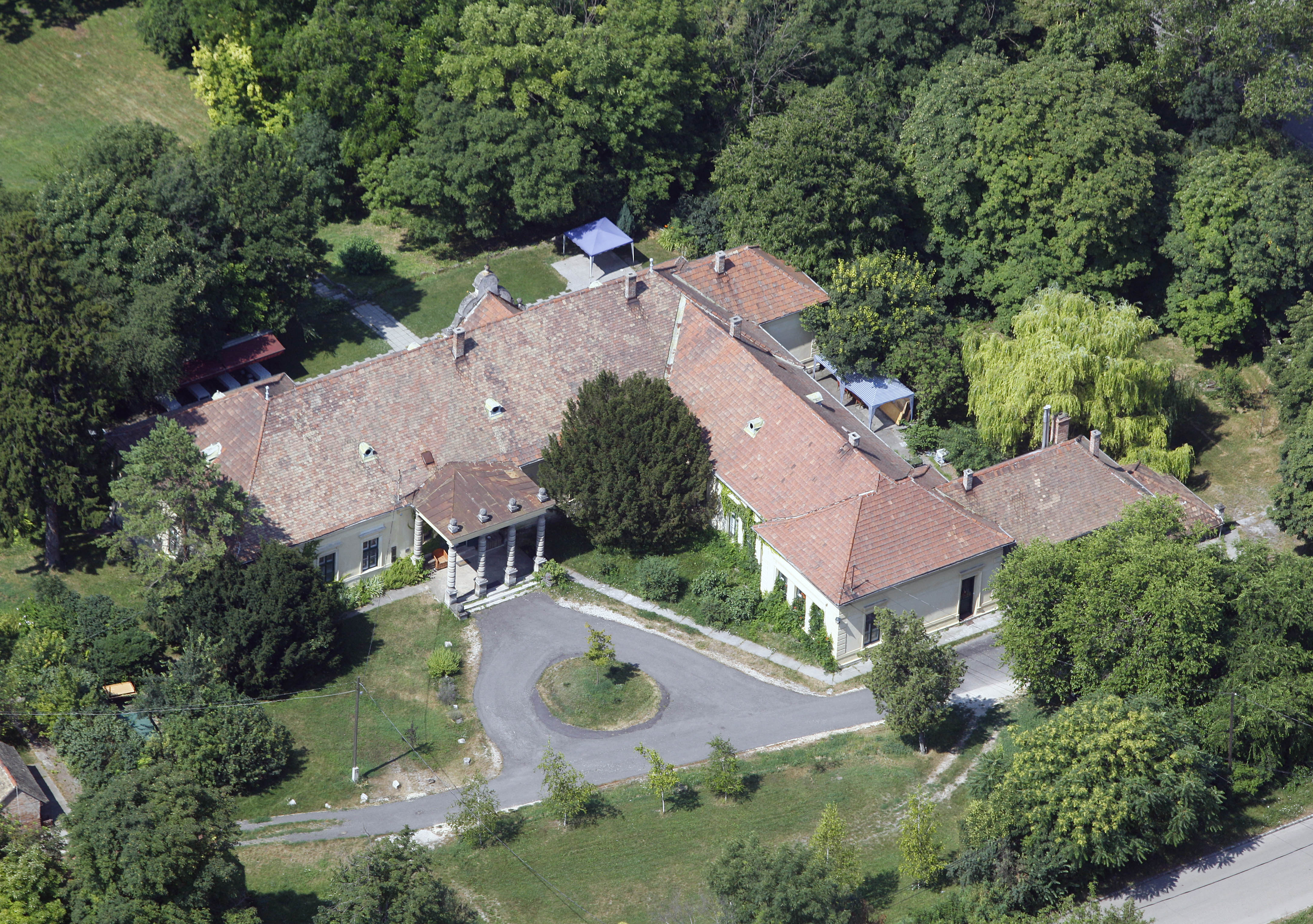
Barcza Mansion in Pusztazámor

== See also ==
- List of cities and towns in Hungary
