= Martonvásár District =

Martonvásár District Martonvásári járás
- Districts of Hungary
- Coat of arms

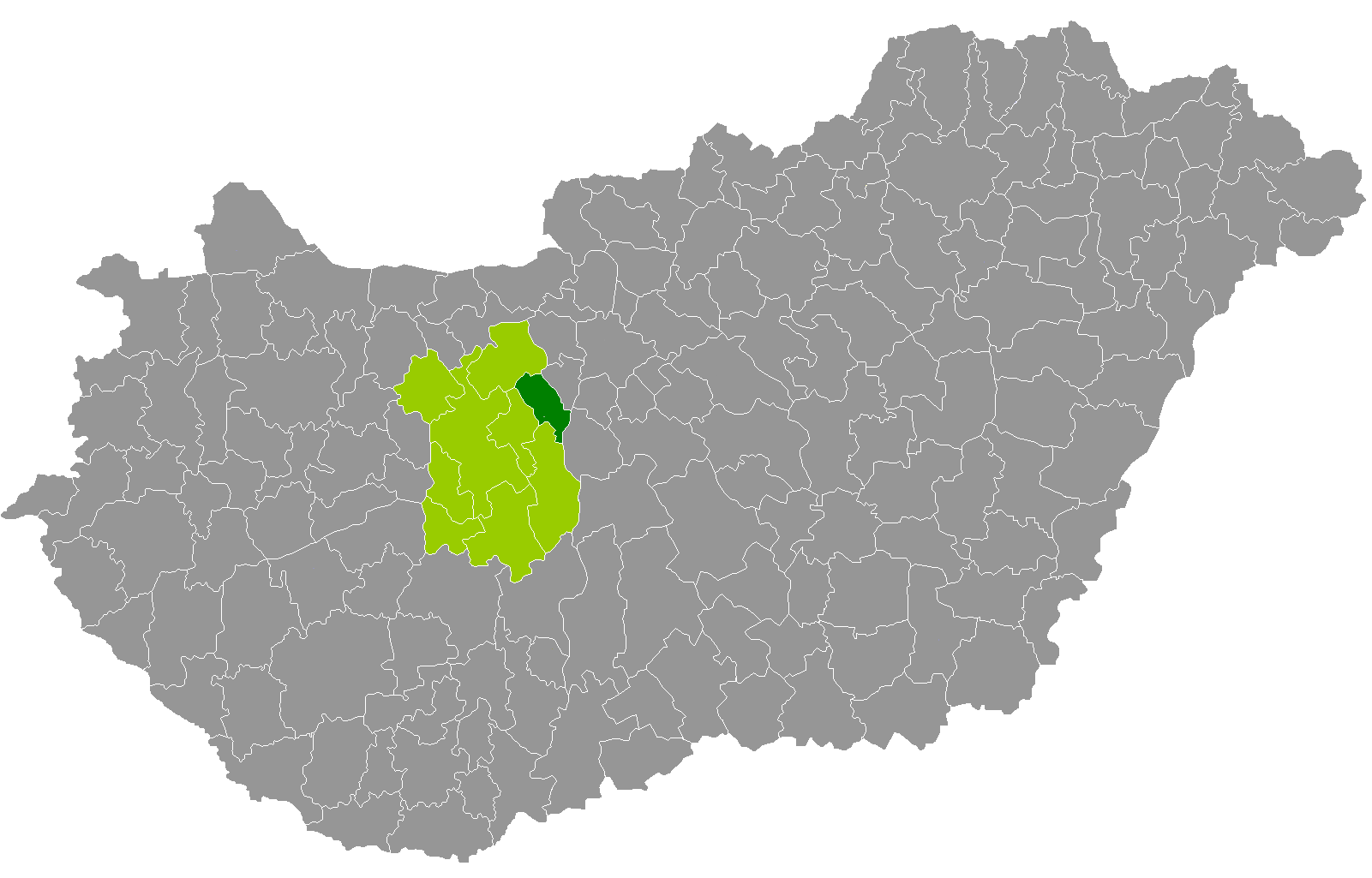
- Martonvásár District within Hungary and Fejér County.
- Coordinates: 47.31°N 18.79°E
- Country: Hungary
- County: Fejér
- District seat: Martonvásár

Area
  - Total: 277.13 km^{2} (107.00 sq mi)
  - Rank: 8th in Fejér

Population (2011 census)
  - Total: 28,040
  - Rank: 7th in Fejér
  - Density: 101/km^{2} (260/sq mi)

Martonvásár (Hungarian: Martonvásári járás) is a district in eastern part of Fejér County. Martonvásár is also the name of the town where the district seat is found. The district is located in the Central Transdanubia Statistical Region.

== Geography ==
Martonvásár District borders with Bicske District to the north, Érd District and Ráckeve District (Pest County) to the east, Dunaújváros District to the south, Gárdony District to the west. The number of the inhabited places in Martonvásár District is 8.

== Municipalities ==
The district has 2 towns and 6 villages. (ordered by population, as of 1 January 2012)

- Baracska (2,766)
- **Ercsi** (7,999)
- Gyúró (1,254)
- Kajászó (1,055)
- **Martonvásár** (5,811) – district seat
- Ráckeresztúr (3,311)
- Tordas (2,123)
- Vál (2,521)

The bolded municipalities are cities.

== See also ==
- List of cities and towns in Hungary
