= Districts of Hungary =

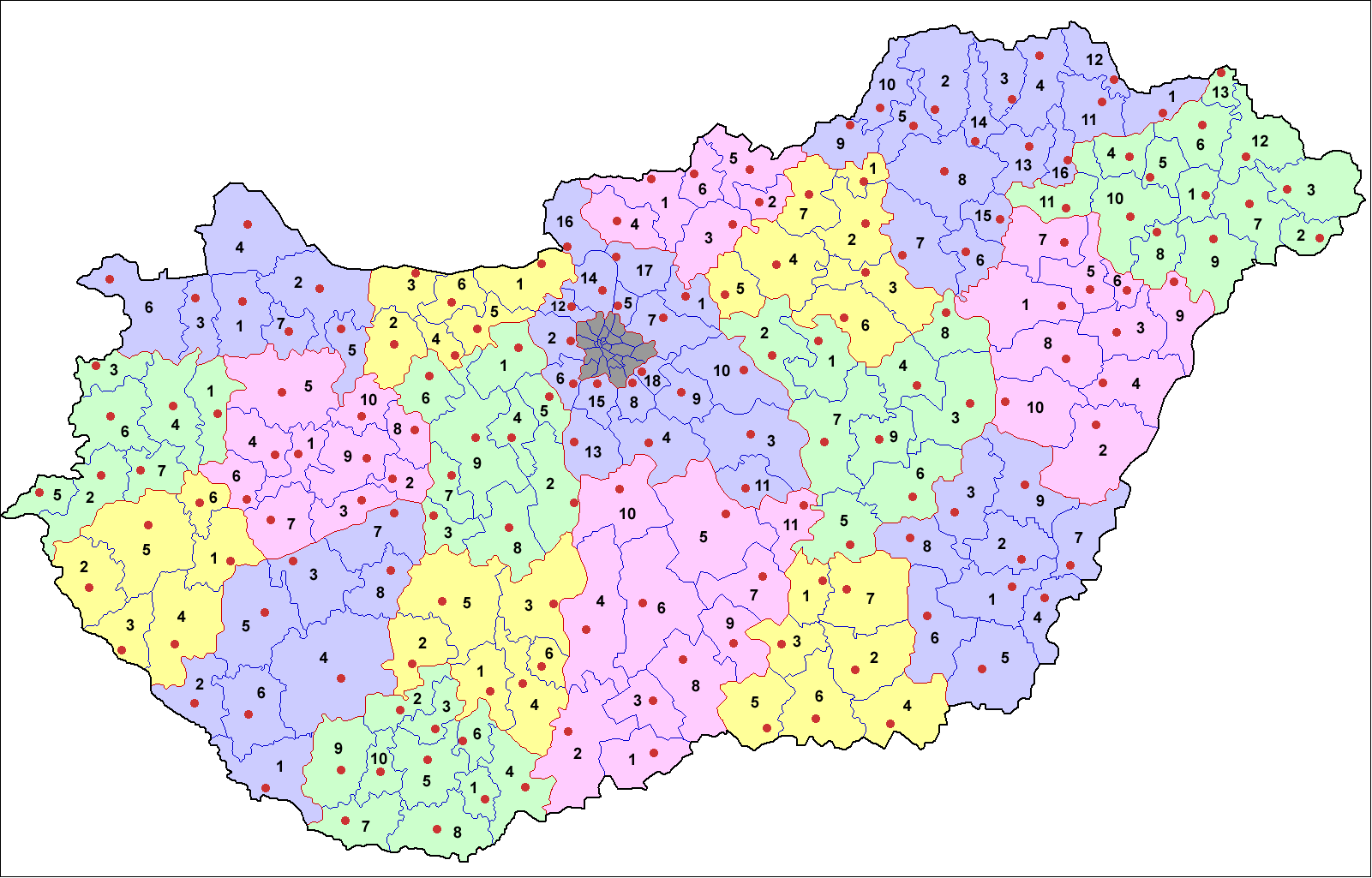
Districts of Hungary

Districts of Hungary are the second-level divisions of Hungary after counties. They replaced the 175 subregions of Hungary in 2013.

There are 197 districts in the 19 counties, and there are 23 districts in Budapest. Districts of the 19 counties are numbered by Arabic numerals and named after the district seat, while districts of Budapest are numbered by Roman numerals and named after the historical towns and neighbourhoods. In Hungarian, the districts of the capital and the rest of the country hold different titles. The districts of Budapest are called kerületek (lit. district, pl.) and the districts of the country are called járások.

== By county ==
=== Baranya County ===
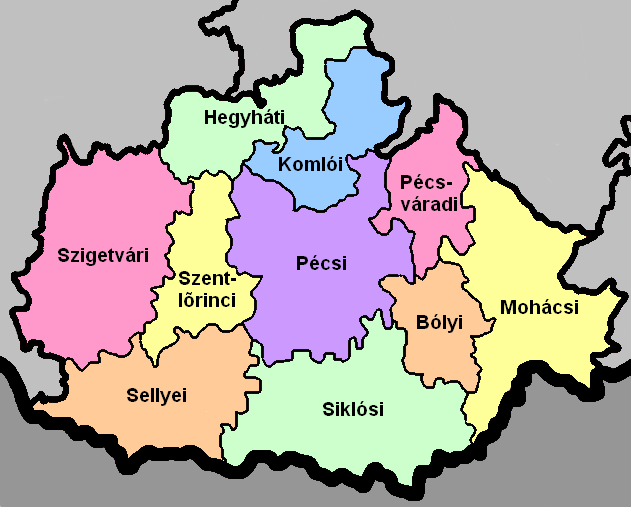
A map of the districts in Baranya County

Baranya County
№	District	District seat	Area (km^{2})	Population (2013)	Density (pop/km^{2})	No. of	
№	District	District seat	Area (km^{2})	Population (2013)	Density (pop/km^{2})	municipalities	towns
1	Bóly District	Bóly	220.03	11,879	54	16	1
2	Hegyhát District	Sásd	360.72	12,666	35	25	2
3	Komló District	Komló	292.48	35,084	120	20	1
4	Mohács District	Mohács	600.98	34,901	58	26	1
5	Pécs District	Pécs	623.07	180,138	289	40	2
6	Pécsvárad District	Pécsvárad	246.44	11,787	48	17	1
7	Sellye District	Sellye	493.69	14 383	29	38	1
8	Siklós District	Siklós	652.99	36,101	55	53	3
9	Szentlőrinc District	Szentlőrinc	282.43	15,044	53	21	1
10	Szigetvár District	Szigetvár	656.76	25,158	38	45	1

=== Bács-Kiskun County ===
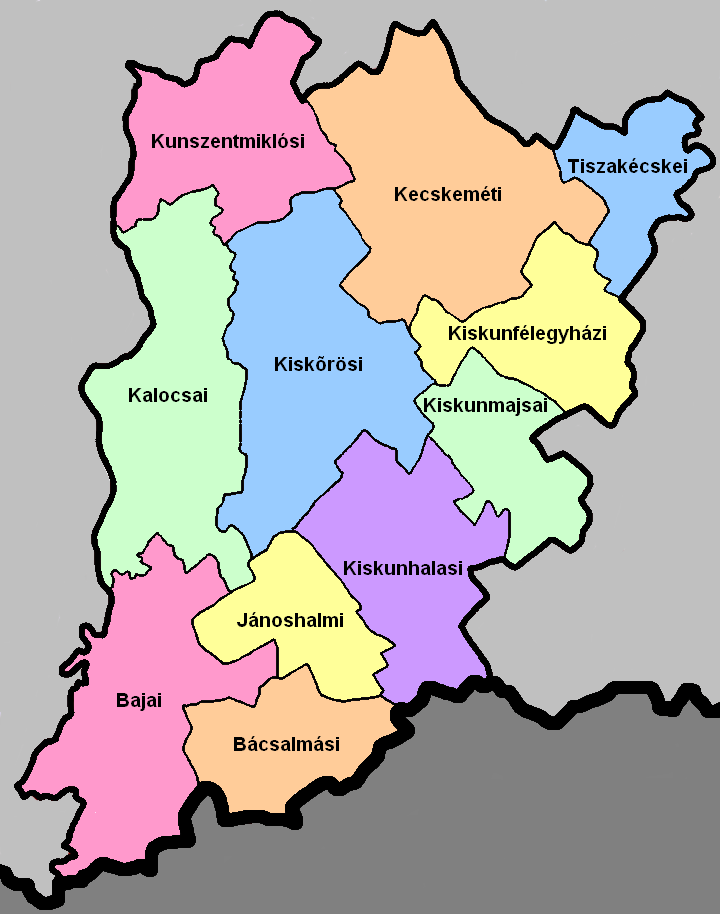
A map of the districts in Bács-Kiskun County

Bács-Kiskun County
№	District	District seat	Area (km^{2})	Population (2013)	Density (pop/km^{2})	No. of	
№	District	District seat	Area (km^{2})	Population (2013)	Density (pop/km^{2})	municipalities	towns
1	Bácsalmás District	Bácsalmás	522.54	19,983	38	10	1
2	Baja District	Baja	1,008.80	66,600	66	17	1
3	Jánoshalma District	Jánoshalma	439.03	17,297	39	5	2
4	Kalocsa District	Kalocsa	1,062.27	51,028	48	21	3
5	Kecskemét District	Kecskemét	1,212.21	156,413	129	16	3
6	Kiskőrös District	Kiskőrös	1,130.33	55,155	49	15	4
7	Kiskunfélegyháza District	Kiskunfélegyháza	582.37	36,856	63	6	1
8	Kiskunhalas District	Kiskunhalas	826.35	43,735	53	9	2
9	Kiskunmajsa District	Kiskunmajsa	485.13	19,206	40	6	1
10	Kunszentmiklós District	Kunszentmiklós	769.81	29,906	39	9	3
11	Tiszakécske District	Tiszakécske	405.99	23,435	59	5	1

=== Békés County ===
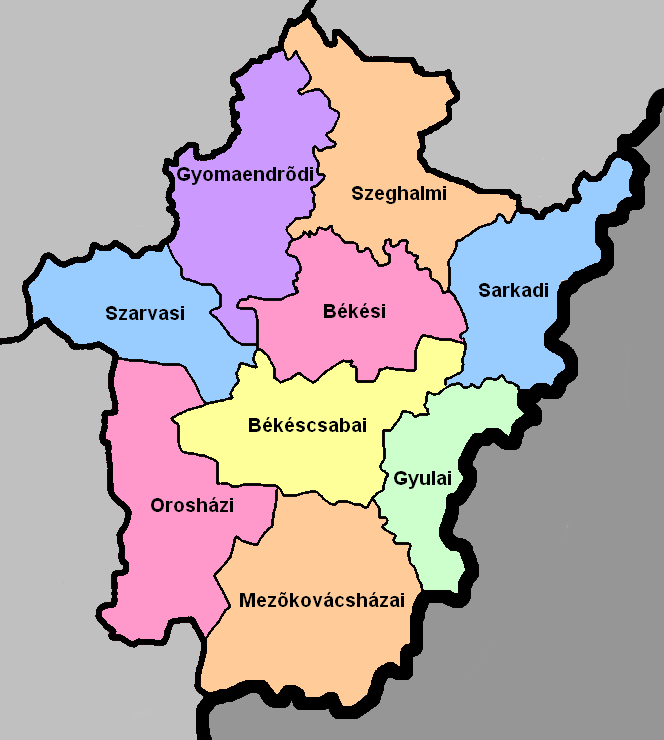
A map of the districts in Békés County

Békés County
№	District	District seat	Area (km^{2})	Population (2013)	Density (pop/km^{2})	No. of	
№	District	District seat	Area (km^{2})	Population (2013)	Density (pop/km^{2})	municipalities	towns
1	Békéscsaba District	Békéscsaba	636.16	82,424	130	9	3
2	Békés District	Békés	525.24	37,259	71	7	2
3	Gyomaendrőd District	Gyomaendrőd	686.21	23,980	35	5	2
4	Gyula District	Gyula	413.22	41,579	101	4	2
5	Mezőkovácsháza District	Mezőkovácsháza	881.49	40,608	46	18	4
6	Orosháza District	Orosháza	717.18	51,392	72	8	2
7	Sarkad District	Sarkad	570.97	23,228	41	11	1
8	Szarvas District	Szarvas	485.06	28,558	59	6	1
9	Szeghalom District	Szeghalom	714.19	30,125	42	7	4

=== Borsod-Abaúj-Zemplén County ===
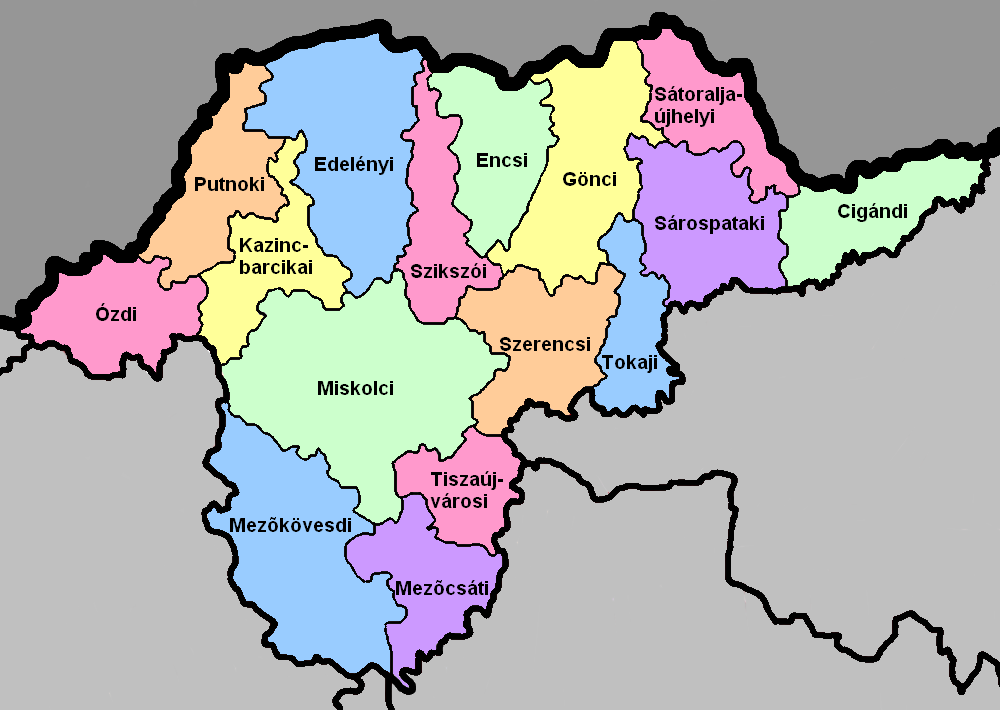
A map of the districts in Borsod-Abaúj-Zemplén County

Borsod-Abaúj-Zemplén County
№	District	District seat	Area (km^{2})	Population (2013)	Density (pop/km^{2})	No. of	
№	District	District seat	Area (km^{2})	Population (2013)	Density (pop/km^{2})	municipalities	towns
1	Cigánd District	Cigánd	389.99	16,294	42	15	1
2	Edelény District	Edelény	717.86	34,012	47	45	2
3	Encs District	Encs	378.39	21,783	58	29	1
4	Gönc District	Gönc	549.60	19,549	35	32	2
5	Kazincbarcika District	Kazincbarcika	341.72	65,828	193	22	3
6	Mezőcsát District	Mezőcsát	351.27	14,635	42	8	1
7	Mezőkövesd District	Mezőkövesd	723.86	42,442	59	23	2
8	Miskolc District	Miskolc	972.80	245,384	252	39	6
9	Ózd District	Ózd	385.57	54,527	141	17	2
10	Putnok District	Putnok	391.25	19,252	49	26	1
11	Sárospatak District	Sárospatak	477.67	25,057	52	16	1
12	Sátoraljaújhely District	Sátoraljaújhely	321.38	22,673	71	21	2
13	Szerencs District	Szerencs	432.09	38,259	89	14	1
14	Szikszó District	Szikszó	309.24	17,566	37	24	1
15	Tiszaújváros District	Tiszaújváros	248.87	31,801	128	16	1
16	Tokaj District	Tokaj	255.80	13,383	52	11	1

=== Csongrád-Csanád County ===
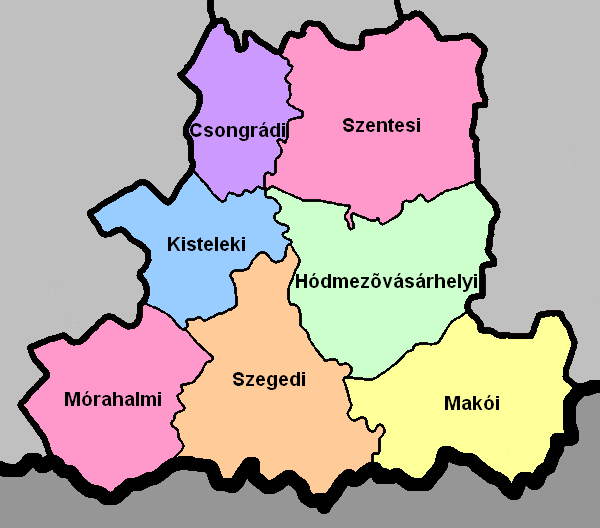
A map of the districts in Csongrád County

Csongrád-Csanád County
№	District	District seat	Area (km^{2})	Population (2013)	Density (pop/km^{2})	No. of	
№	District	District seat	Area (km^{2})	Population (2013)	Density (pop/km^{2})	municipalities	towns
1	Csongrád District	Csongrád	339.24	22,697	67	4	1
2	Hódmezővásárhely District	Hódmezővásárhely	707.77	56,164	79	4	2
3	Kistelek District	Kistelek	410.20	18,429	45	6	1
4	Makó District	Makó	688.85	44,612	65	15	2
5	Mórahalom District	Mórahalom	561.71	28,741	51	10	1
6	Szeged District	Szeged	741.10	197,679	267	13	2
7	Szentes District	Szentes	813.84	41,249	51	8	1

=== Fejér County ===
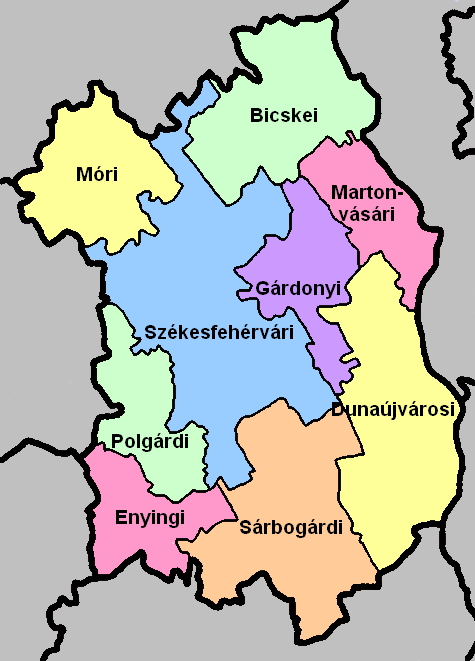
A map of the districts in Fejér County

Fejér County
№	District	District seat	Area (km^{2})	Population (2013)	Density (pop/km^{2})	No. of	
№	District	District seat	Area (km^{2})	Population (2013)	Density (pop/km^{2})	municipalities	towns
1	Bicske District	Bicske	578.25	35,660	62	15	1
2	Dunaújváros District	Dunaújváros	650.05	91,854	141	16	4
3	Enying District	Enying	433.12	13,187	46	9	1
4	Gárdony District	Gárdony	306.79	29,775	97	10	2
5	Martonvásár District	Martonvásár	277.13	26,531	96	8	2
6	Mór District	Mór	417.55	34,431	83	13	2
7	Polgárdi	city district	568.364				
8	Sárbogárd District	Sárbogárd	653.52	28,509	44	12	1
9	Székesfehérvár District	Székesfehérvár	1,032.05	156,935	152	25	3

=== Győr-Moson-Sopron County ===
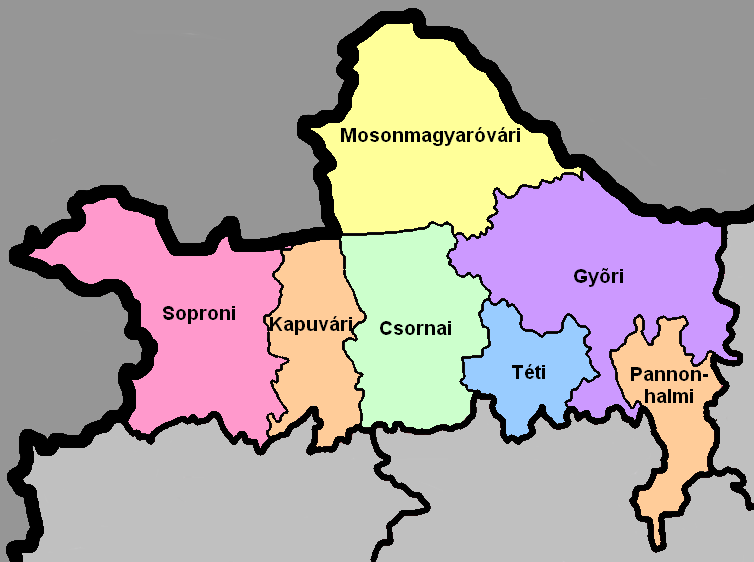
A map of the districts in Győr-Moson-Sopron County

Győr-Moson-Sopron County
№	District	District seat	Area (km^{2})	Population (2013)	Density (pop/km^{2})	No. of	
№	District	District seat	Area (km^{2})	Population (2013)	Density (pop/km^{2})	municipalities	towns
1	Csorna District	Csorna	579.77	32,882	57	33	1
2	Győr District	Győr	903.41	189,857	210	35	1
3	Kapuvár District	Kapuvár	372.14	23,705	64	19	2
4	Mosonmagyaróvár District	Mosonmagyaróvár	899.97	72,532	81	26	2
5	Pannonhalma District	Pannonhalma	312.35	15,522	50	17	1
6	Sopron District	Sopron	867.75	99,271	114	39	3
7	Tét District	Tét	272.62	14,543	53	14	1

=== Hajdú-Bihar County ===
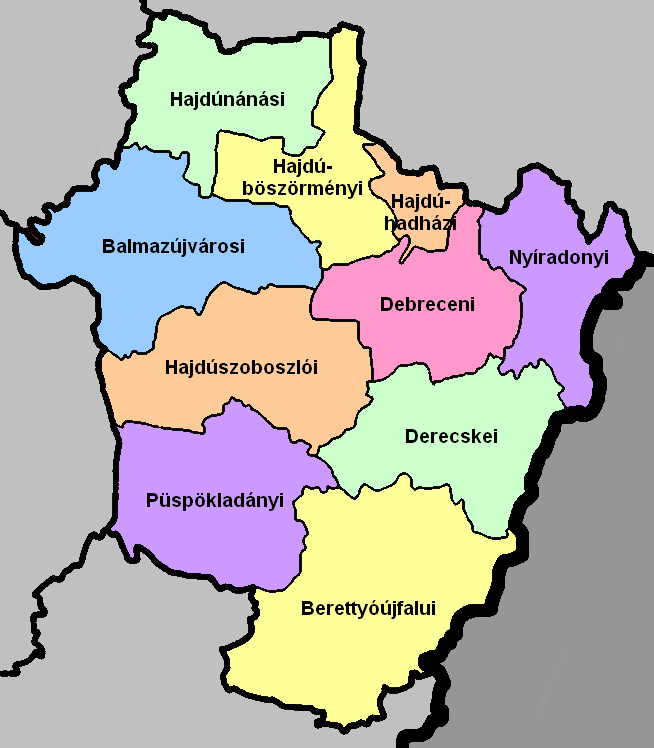
A map of the districts in Hajdú-Bihar County

Hajdú-Bihar County
№	District	District seat	Area (km^{2})	Population (2013)	Density (pop/km^{2})	No. of	
№	District	District seat	Area (km^{2})	Population (2013)	Density (pop/km^{2})	municipalities	towns
1	Balmazújváros District	Balmazújváros	827.44	30,488	37	5	2
2	Berettyóújfalu District	Berettyóújfalu	1,073.90	45,539	42	25	3
3	Debrecen District	Debrecen	531.13	217,217	409	2	2
4	Derecske District	Derecske	650.31	41,820	64	13	2
5	Hajdúböszörmény District	Hajdúböszörmény	471.43	40,424	86	2	2
6	Hajdúhadház District	Hajdúhadház	137.02	22,328	163	3	2
7	Hajdúnánás District	Hajdúnánás	547.27	29,638	54	6	2
8	Hajdúszoboszló District	Hajdúszoboszló	732.65	43,175	59	5	2
9	Nyíradony District	Nyíradony	510.31	29,846	58	9	2
10	Püspökladány District	Püspökladány	729.05	40,877	56	12	2

=== Heves County ===
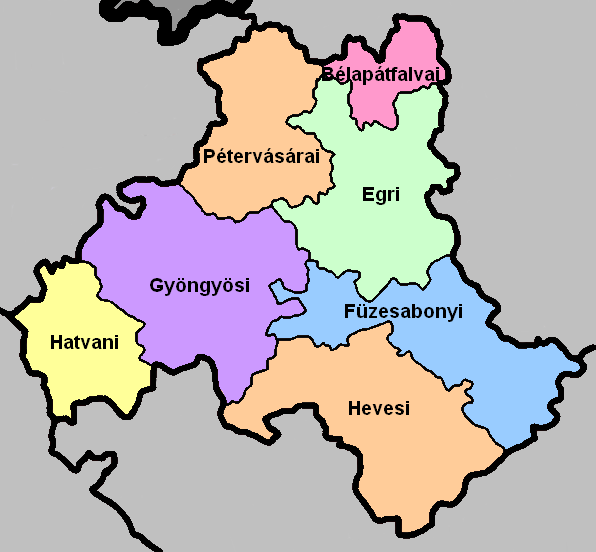
A map of the districts in Heves County

Heves County
№	District	District seat	Area (km^{2})	Population (2013)	Density (pop/km^{2})	No. of	
№	District	District seat	Area (km^{2})	Population (2013)	Density (pop/km^{2})	municipalities	towns
1	Bélapátfalva District	Bélapátfalva	180.89	8,870	49	8	1
2	Eger District	Eger	602.05	86,241	143	22	2
3	Füzesabony District	Füzesabony	578.56	30,396	53	16	1
4	Gyöngyös District	Gyöngyös	750.78	73,460	98	25	2
5	Hatvan District	Hatvan	352.16	50,872	144	13	2
6	Heves District	Heves	697.68	35,116	50	17	2
7	Pétervására District	Pétervására	475.07	21,381	45	20	1

=== Jász-Nagykun-Szolnok County ===
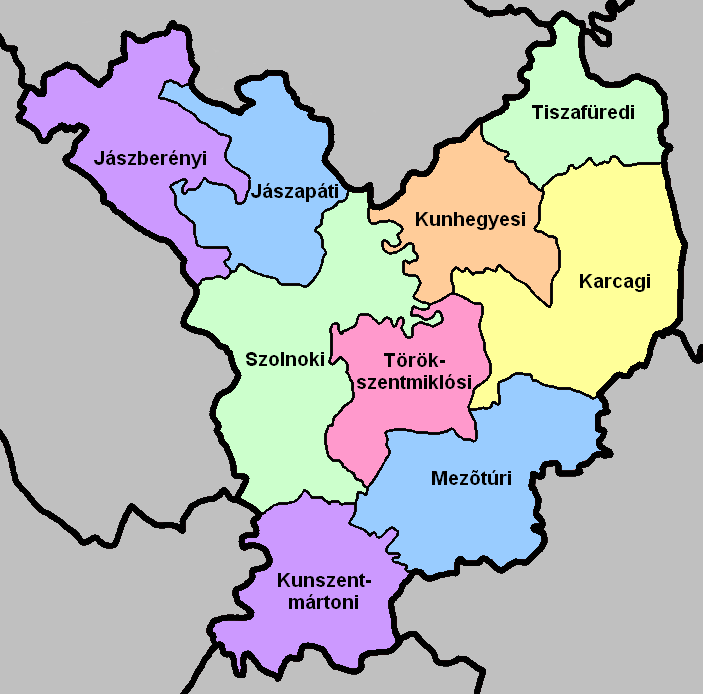
A map of the districts in Jász-Nagykun-Szolnok County

Jász-Nagykun-Szolnok County
№	District	District seat	Area (km^{2})	Population (2013)	Density (pop/km^{2})	No. of	
№	District	District seat	Area (km^{2})	Population (2013)	Density (pop/km^{2})	municipalities	towns
1	Jászapáti District	Jászapáti	544.45	33,160	61	9	2
2	Jászberény District	Jászberény	617.01	50,928	83	9	3
3	Karcag District	Karcag	857.26	43,152	50	5	3
4	Kunhegyes District	Kunhegyes	464.58	20,434	44	7	2
5	Kunszentmárton District	Kunszentmárton	576.49	36,300	63	11	2
6	Mezőtúr District	Mezőtúr	725.74	27,798	38	5	2
7	Szolnok District	Szolnok	914.48	118,245	129	18	5
8	Tiszafüred District	Tiszafüred	417.05	19,895	48	7	1
9	Törökszentmiklós District	Törökszentmiklós	464.54	36,742	79	7	2

=== Komárom-Esztergom County ===
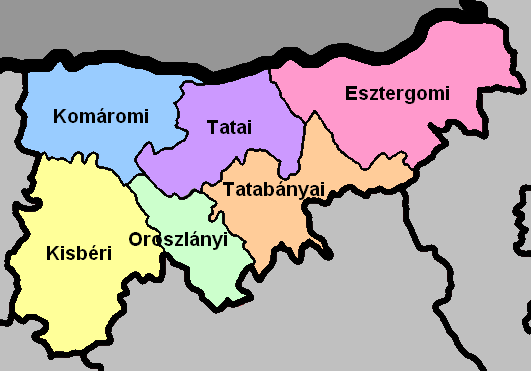
A map of the districts in Komárom-Esztergom County

Komárom-Esztergom County
№	District	District seat	Area (km^{2})	Population (2013)	Density (pop/km^{2})	No. of	
№	District	District seat	Area (km^{2})	Population (2013)	Density (pop/km^{2})	municipalities	towns
1	Esztergom District	Esztergom	537.26	92,902	173	24	5
2	Kisbér District	Kisbér	510.55	20 221	40	17	1
3	Komárom District	Komárom	378.76	39,559	104	9	3
4	Oroszlány District	Oroszlány	199.39	25,973	130	6	1
5	Tatabánya District	Tatabánya	331.65	85,054	256	10	1
6	Tata District	Tata	306.72	38,742	126	10	1

=== Nógrád County ===
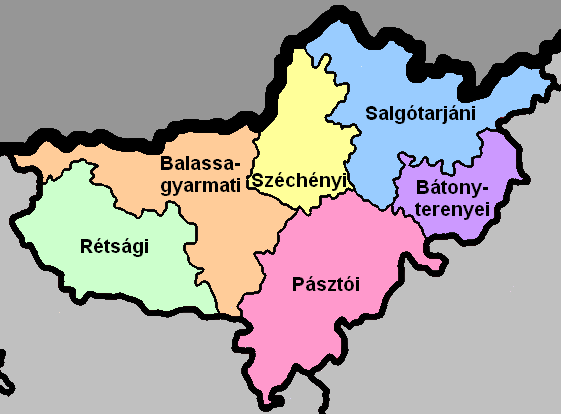
A map of the districts in Nógrád County

Nógrád County
№	District	District seat	Area (km^{2})	Population (2013)	Density (pop/km^{2})	No. of	
№	District	District seat	Area (km^{2})	Population (2013)	Density (pop/km^{2})	municipalities	towns
1	Balassagyarmat District	Balassagyarmat	532.94	39,829	75	29	1
2	Bátonyterenye District	Bátonyterenye	215.45	21,590	100	8	1
3	Pásztó District	Pásztó	551.57	31,497	57	26	1
4	Rétság District	Rétság	435.03	23,789	55	25	1
5	Salgótarján District	Salgótarján	525.23	64,504	123	29	1
6	Szécsény District	Szécsény	285.25	19,537	68	14	1

=== Pest County ===
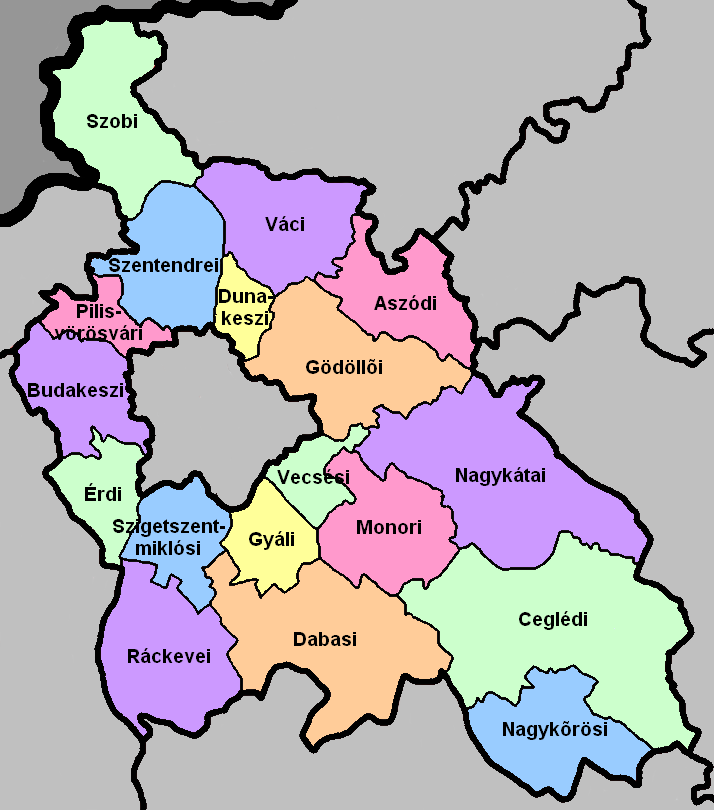
A map of the districts in Pest County

Pest County
№	District	District seat	Area (km^{2})	Population (2013)	Density (pop/km^{2})	No. of	
№	District	District seat	Area (km^{2})	Population (2013)	Density (pop/km^{2})	municipalities	towns
1	Aszód District	Aszód	298.37	36,992	126	11	2
2	Budakeszi District	Budakeszi	288.95	84,646	293	12	4
3	Cegléd District	Cegléd	886.30	89,261	101	12	3
4	Dabas District	Dabas	614.23	48,746	79	11	2
5	Dunakeszi District	Dunakeszi	103.07	78,757	764	4	3
6	Érd District	Érd	184.29	117,304	637	7	4
7	Gödöllő District	Gödöllő	449.66	140,205	312	15	6
8	Gyál District	Gyál	170.99	40,309	236	4	2
9	Monor District	Monor	329.81	64,227	195	11	3
10	Nagykáta District	Nagykáta	710.12	74,168	104	16	3
12	Nagykőrös District	Nagykőrös	349.25	27,824	80	3	1
13	Pilisvörösvár District	Pilisvörösvár	130.81	52,466	401	9	2
14	Ráckeve District	Ráckeve	417.05	36,120	87	11	1
15	Szentendre District	Szentendre	326.58	77,720	238	13	4
16	Szigetszentmiklós District	Szigetszentmiklós	211.28	110,033	521	9	6
17	Szob District	Szob	438.32	24,487	56	17	2
18	Vác District	Vác	362.23	67,781	187	18	2
19	Vecsés District	Vecsés	119.74	47,126	394	4	3

=== Somogy County ===
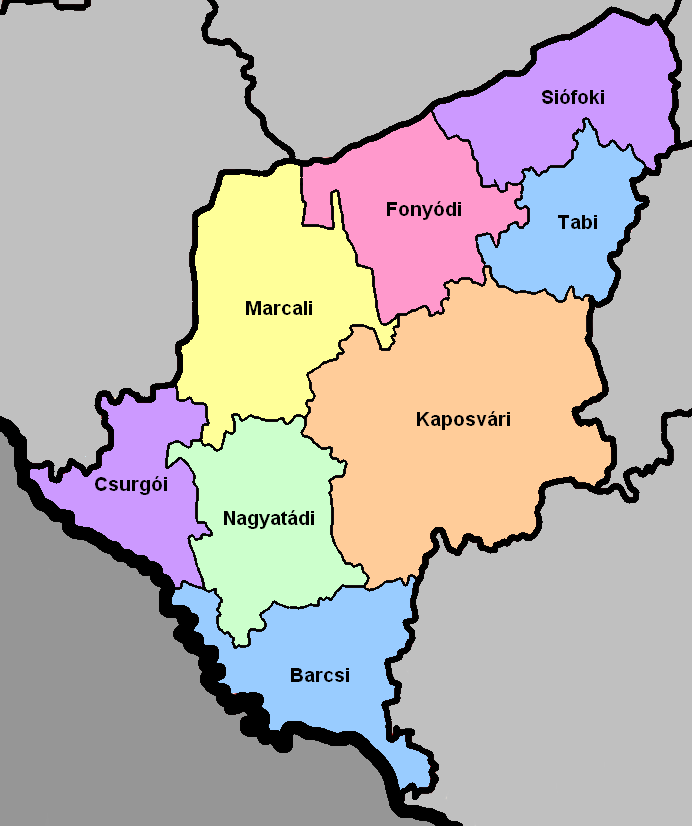
A map of the districts in Somogy County

Somogy County
№	District	District seat	Area (km^{2})	Population (2013)	Density (pop/km^{2})	No. of	
№	District	District seat	Area (km^{2})	Population (2013)	Density (pop/km^{2})	municipalities	towns
1	Barcs District	Barcs	696.47	23,817	34	26	1
2	Csurgó District	Csurgó	496.20	16,807	34	18	1
3	Fonyód District	Fonyód	645.44	34,599	54	21	4
4	Kaposvár District	Kaposvár	1,591.36	117,492	74	78	4
5	Marcali District	Marcali	904.24	34,734	38	37	1
6	Nagyatád District	Nagyatád	647.07	26,100	40	18	1
7	Siófok District	Siófok	657.05	51,761	79	24	3
8	Tab District	Tab	427.24	12,786	30	24	1

=== Szabolcs-Szatmár-Bereg County ===
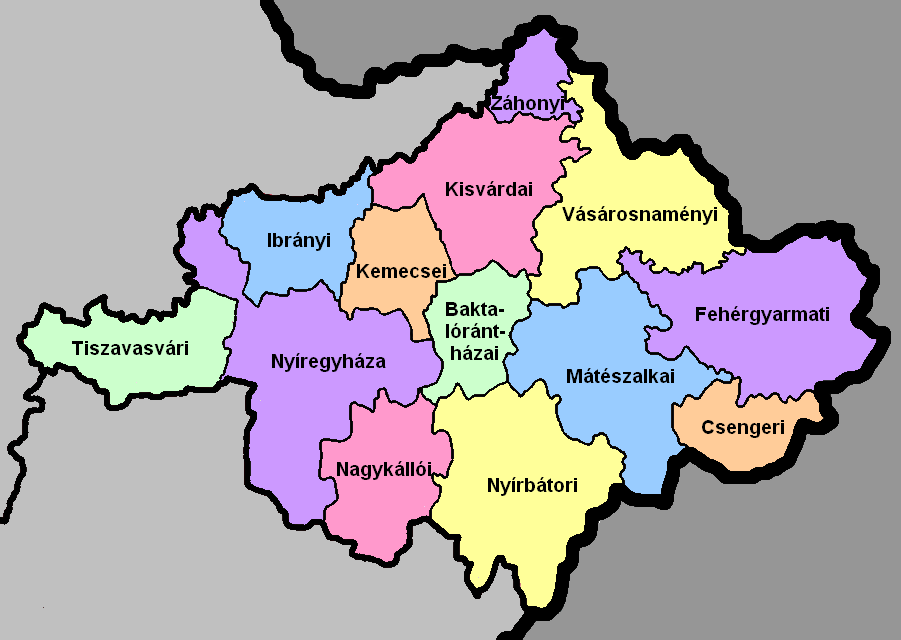
A map of the districts in Szabolcs-Szatmár-Bereg County

Szabolcs-Szatmár-Bereg County
№	District	District seat	Area (km^{2})	Population (2013)	Density (pop/km^{2})	No. of	
№	District	District seat	Area (km^{2})	Population (2013)	Density (pop/km^{2})	municipalities	towns
1	Baktalórántháza District	Baktalórántháza	254.47	19,521	77	12	1
2	Csenger District	Csenger	246.51	13,839	56	11	1
3	Fehérgyarmat District	Fehérgyarmat	707.38	38,363	54	50	1
4	Ibrány District	Ibrány	304.91	23,850	78	8	2
5	Kemecse District	Kemecse	246.41	22,185	90	11	2
6	Kisvárda District	Kisvárda	523.09	57,050	109	23	3
7	Mátészalka District	Mátészalka	624.70	64,810	104	26	3
8	Nagykálló District	Nagykálló	377.37	30,430	81	8	2
9	Nyírbátor District	Nyírbátor	695.94	43,557	63	20	3
10	Nyíregyháza District	Nyíregyháza	809.60	166,684	206	15	4
11	Tiszavasvári District	Tiszavasvári	381.61	27,306	72	6	2
12	Vásárosnamény District	Vásárosnamény	617.94	36,689	59	28	2
13	Záhony District	Záhony	145.92	19,369	133	11	2

=== Tolna County ===
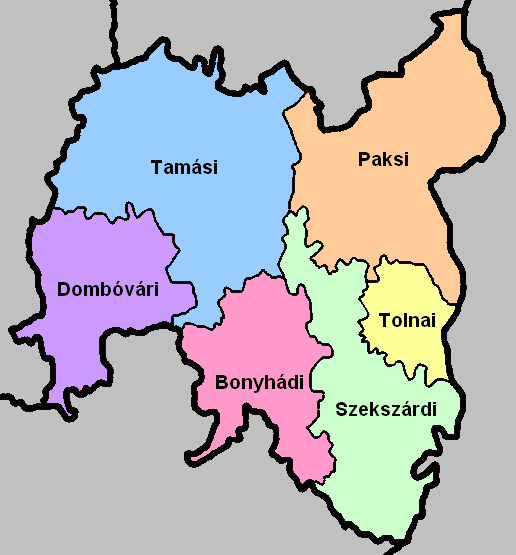
A map of the districts in Tolna County

Tolna County
№	District	District seat	Area (km^{2})	Population (2013)	Density (pop/km^{2})	No. of	
№	District	District seat	Area (km^{2})	Population (2013)	Density (pop/km^{2})	municipalities	towns
1	Bonyhád District	Bonyhád	476.81	31,582	66	25	2
2	Dombóvár District	Dombóvár	509.02	32,333	64	16	1
3	Paks District	Paks	836.00	49,610	59	15	2
4	Szekszárd District	Szekszárd	656.18	59,412	91	17	2
5	Tamási District	Tamási	1,019.93	38,785	38	32	3
6	Tolna District	Tolna	205.24	18,210	89	4	1

=== Vas County ===
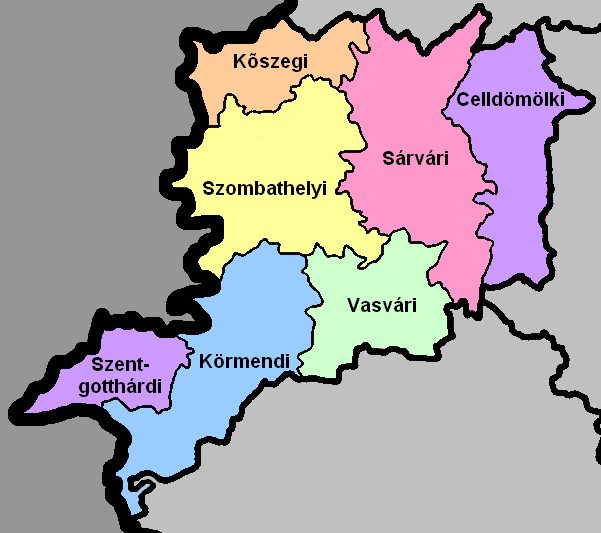
A map of the districts in Vas County

Vas County
№	District	District seat	Area (km^{2})	Population (2013)	Density (pop/km^{2})	No. of	
№	District	District seat	Area (km^{2})	Population (2013)	Density (pop/km^{2})	municipalities	towns
1	Celldömölk District	Celldömölk	474.13	24,787	52	28	2
2	Körmend District	Körmend	614.53	26,865	44	46	2
3	Kőszeg District	Kőszeg	286.45	25,473	89	21	3
4	Sárvár District	Sárvár	685.45	38,862	57	42	2
5	Szentgotthárd District	Szentgotthárd	255.04	15,180	60	16	1
6	Szombathely District	Szombathely	646.36	110,504	171	40	2
7	Vasvár District	Vasvár	374.14	13,636	36	23	1

=== Veszprém County ===
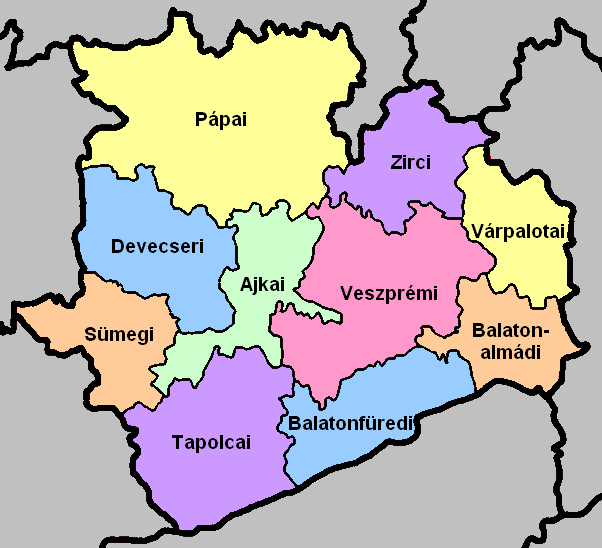
A map of the districts in Veszprém County

Veszprém County
№	District	District seat	Area (km^{2})	Population (2013)	Density (pop/km^{2})	No. of	
№	District	District seat	Area (km^{2})	Population (2013)	Density (pop/km^{2})	municipalities	towns
1	Ajka District	Ajka	320.71	39,154	122	11	1
2	Balatonalmádi District	Balatonalmádi	239.76	24,479	102	10	3
3	Balatonfüred District	Balatonfüred	357.74	24,250	68	22	1
4	Devecser District	Devecser	421.73	14,948	35	28	1
5	Pápa District	Pápa	1,022.09	58,935	58	49	1
6	Sümeg District	Sümeg	306.41	15,390	50	21	1
7	Tapolca District	Tapolca	540.30	34,689	64	33	2
8	Várpalota District	Várpalota	294.28	37,451	127	8	2
9	Veszprém District	Veszprém	629.61	82,353	131	19	2
10	Zirc District	Zirc	331.02	19,516	59	15	1

=== Zala County ===
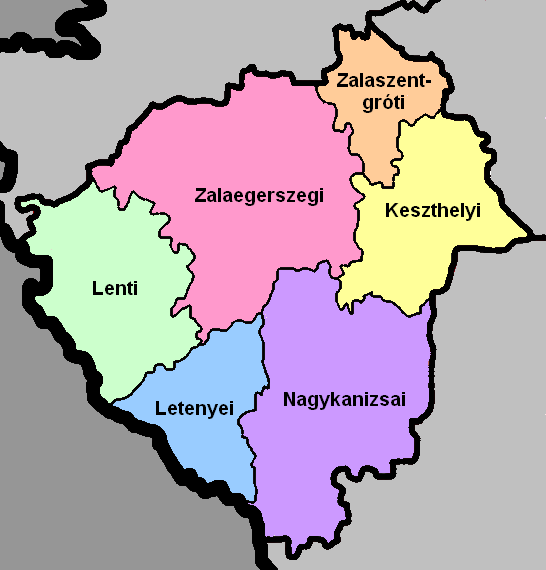
A map of the districts in Zala County

Zala County
№	District	District seat	Area (km^{2})	Population (2013)	Density (pop/km^{2})	No. of	
№	District	District seat	Area (km^{2})	Population (2013)	Density (pop/km^{2})	municipalities	towns
1	Keszthely District	Keszthely	535.93	49,384	92	30	2
2	Lenti District	Lenti	624.12	19,783	32	48	1
3	Letenye District	Letenye	388.68	16,413	42	27	1
4	Nagykanizsa District	Nagykanizsa	907.91	78,022	86	49	2
5	Zalaegerszeg District	Zalaegerszeg	1,044.70	102,553	98	84	3
6	Zalaszentgrót District	Zalaszentgrót	282.56	15,518	55	20	1

== Statistics ==
- Not including districts in Budapest.

=== By area ===
Biggest districts by area

1. Kaposvár District, (Somogy) – 1,591.36 km^{2}
2. Kecskemét District, (Bács-Kiskun) – 1,212.21 km^{2}
3. Kiskőrös District, (Bács-Kiskun) – 1,130.33 km^{2}
4. Berettyóújfalu District, (Hajdú-Bihar) – 1,073.90 km^{2}
5. Kalocsa District, (Bács-Kiskun) – 1,062.27 km^{2}
6. Zalaegerszeg District, (Zala) – 1,044.70 km^{2}
7. Székesfehérvár District, (Fejér) – 1,032.05 km^{2}
8. Pápa District, (Veszprém) – 1,022.09 km^{2}
9. Tamási District, (Tolna) – 1,019.94 km^{2}
10. Baja District, (Bács-Kiskun) – 1,008.80 km^{2}

Lowest districts by area

1. Dunakeszi District, (Pest) – 103.07 km^{2}
2. Vecsés District, (Pest) – 119.74 km^{2}
3. Pilisvörösvár District, (Pest) – 130.81 km^{2}
4. Hajdúhadház District, (Hajdú-Bihar) – 137.02 km^{2}
5. Záhony District, (Szabolcs-Szatmár-Bereg) – 145.92 km^{2}
6. Gyál District, (Pest) – 170.99 km^{2}
7. Bélapátfalva District, (Heves) – 180.89 km^{2}
8. Érd District, (Pest) – 184.29 km^{2}
9. Oroszlány District, (Komárom-Esztergom) – 199.39 km^{2}
10. Tolna District, (Tolna) – 205.24 km^{2}

=== By population ===
Biggest districts by population (2015)

1. Miskolc District, (Borsod-Abaúj-Zemplén) – 240,279
2. Debrecen District, (Hajdú-Bihar) – 216,467
3. Szeged District, (Csongrád) – 198,494
4. Győr District, (Győr-Moson-Sopron) – 192,068
5. Pécs District, (Baranya) – 178,291
6. Nyíregyháza District, (Szabolcs-Szatmár-Bereg) – 165,805
7. Kecskemét District, (Bács-Kiskun) – 156,571
8. Székesfehérvár District, (Fejér) – 152,550
9. Gödöllő District, (Pest) – 141,853
10. Érd District, (Pest) – 118,735

Lowest districts by population (2015)

1. Bélapátfalva District, (Heves) – 8,570
2. Pécsvárad District, (Baranya) – 11,567
3. Bóly District, (Baranya) – 11,607
4. Hegyhát District, (Baranya) – 12,405
5. Tab District, (Somogy) – 12,497
6. Tokaj District, (Borsod-Abaúj-Zemplén) – 12,966
7. Vasvár District, (Vas) – 13,326
8. Csenger District, (Szabolcs-Szatmár-Bereg) – 13,761
9. Sellye District, (Baranya) – 13,986
10. Mezőcsát District, (Borsod-Abaúj-Zemplén) – 14,351

=== By pop. density ===
Biggest districts by population density (2015)

1. Dunakeszi District, (Pest) – 783/km^{2}
2. Érd District, (Pest) – 644/km^{2}
3. Szigetszentmiklós District, (Pest) – 530/km^{2}
4. Debrecen District, (Hajdú-Bihar) – 408/km^{2}
5. Pilisvörösvár District, (Pest) – 406/km^{2}
6. Vecsés District, (Pest) – 398/km^{2}
7. Gödöllő District, (Pest) – 316/km^{2}
8. Budakeszi District, (Pest) – 299/km^{2}
9. Pécs District, (Baranya) – 286/km^{2}
10. Szeged District, (Csongrád) – 268/km^{2}

Lowest districts by population density (2015)

1. Sellye District, (Baranya) – 28/km^{2}
2. Tab District, (Somogy) – 29/km^{2}
3. Lenti District, (Zala) – 31/km^{2}
4. Csurgó District, (Somogy) – 33/km^{2}
  Gönc District, (Borsod-Abaúj-Zemplén)
  Barcs District, (Somogy)
5. Hegyhát District, (Baranya) – 34/km^{2}
  Gyomaendrőd District, (Békés)
6. Devecser District, (Veszprém) – 35/km^{2}
7. Vasvár District, (Vas) – 36/km^{2}
  Balmazújváros District, (Hajdú-Bihar)

=== By municipalities ===
Biggest districts by number of municipalities

1. Zalaegerszeg District, (Zala) – 84
2. Kaposvár District, (Somogy) – 78
3. Siklós District, (Baranya) – 53
4. Fehérgyarmat District, (Szabolcs-Szatmár-Bereg) – 50
5. Pápa District, (Veszprém) – 49
  Nagykanizsa District, (Zala)
6. Lenti District, (Zala) – 48
7. Körmend District, (Vas) – 46
8. Szigetvár District, (Baranya) – 45
  Edelény District, (Borsod-Abaúj-Zemplén)

Lowest districts by number of municipalities

1. Debrecen District, (Hajdú-Bihar) – 2
  Hajdúböszörmény District, (Hajdú-Bihar)
2. Hajdúhadház District, (Hajdú-Bihar) – 3
  Nagykőrös District, (Pest)
3. Gyula District, (Békés) – 4
  Csongrád District, (Csongrád)
  Hódmezővásárhely District, (Csongrád)
  Dunakeszi District, (Pest)
  Gyál District, (Pest)
  Vecsés District, (Pest)
  Tolna District, (Tolna)

== See also ==
- Regions of Hungary
- Counties of Hungary
- Districts of Hungary (from 2013)
  - Subregions of Hungary (until 2013)
- Administrative divisions of the Kingdom of Hungary (until 1918)
  - Counties of the Kingdom of Hungary
- Administrative divisions of the Kingdom of Hungary (1941–1945)
- List of cities and towns of Hungary
- NUTS:HU
