= Zoltán Trepák =

Hungarian basketball player

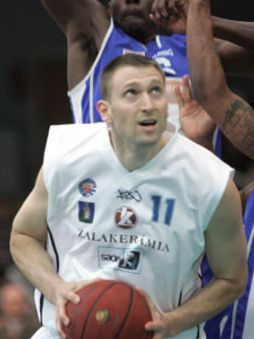

Personal information
- Born: 20 February 1977 (age 49) Budapest, Hungary
- Listed height: 6 ft 11 in (2.11 m)
- Listed weight: 225 lb (102 kg)

Career information
- Playing career: 1995–2016
- Position: Power forward / center

Career history
- 1995–1996: Csepel SC
- 1996–1999: Falco KC
- 1999–2003: Szolnoki Olaj KK
- 2003–2006: Kaposvári KK
- 2006–2008: Marso-Vagép NYKK
- 2008–2010: Zalakerámia ZTE KK
- 2010–2013: Szolnoki Olaj KK
- 2013–2015: Soproni KC
- 2015–2016: MTK Törökbálint

Career highlights
- NB I/A 1999 - Silver, Hungarian Cup 2002 - Gold, Hungarian Cup 2004 - Silver, NB I/A 2004 - Gold, Hungarian Cup 2010 - Gold, NB I/A 2010 - Gold

Zoltán Trepák (born 20 February 1977) is a Hungarian former professional basketball player.

== Career ==
He started to play basketball in Csepel, but after one year the team disappeared from the sport field, he went to Szombathely to Falco KC. He spent there three years, then he played four years in Szolnok. After these years, he contracted to Kaposvár for three years. Still during the Szolnok years played first in the national team, in 2001. After six years he played again there, now he is a 15 times national player. After Kaposvár he played in Nyíregyháza, between 2006 and 2008, in 2008 he went to Zalaegerszeg.

10 January 2008 he played his best in the cup match against the Slovakian Spišská Nová Ves, he got 28 points. In 2014, Trepak played for Sopron KC where he gained 120 points in 35 games and 386 played minutes for his team.
