= Pusztazámor =

- Coat of arms

- Location of Pusztazámor in Hungary
- Coordinates: 47.40292°N 18.78263°E
- Country: Hungary
- Region: Central Hungary
- County: Pest
- Subregion: Budaörsi
- Rank: Village

Area
  - Total: 9.28 km^{2} (3.58 sq mi)

Population (1 January 2008)
  - Total: 1,157
  - Density: 125/km^{2} (323/sq mi)
- Time zone: UTC+1 (CET)
  - Summer (DST): UTC+2 (CEST)
- Postal code: 2039
- Area code: +36 23
- KSH code: 15583
- Website: www.pusztazamor.hu

Pusztazámor is a village in Pest county, Hungary.
