= Üllő =

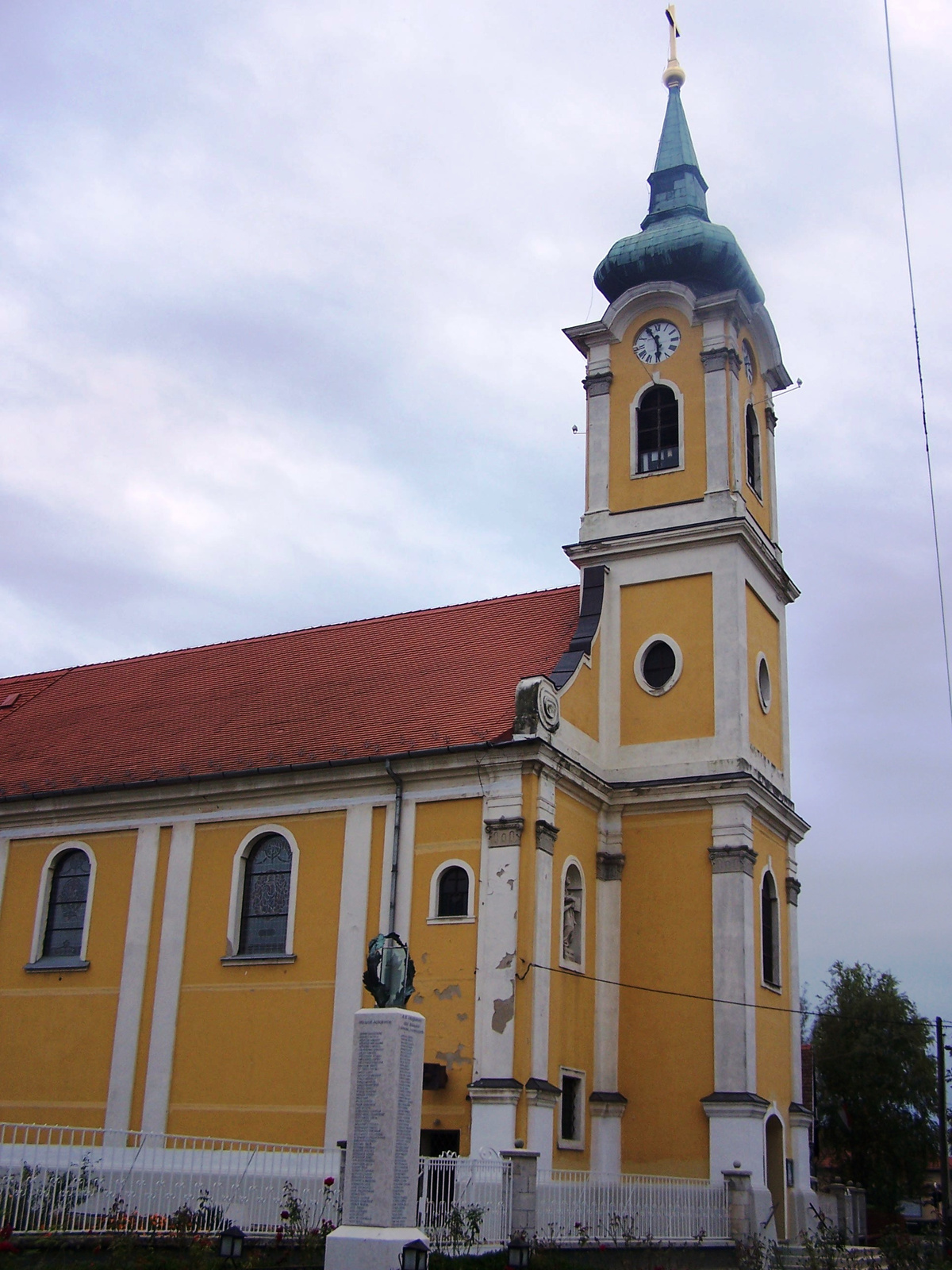
- Church of St John the Baptist

- Flag Coat of arms

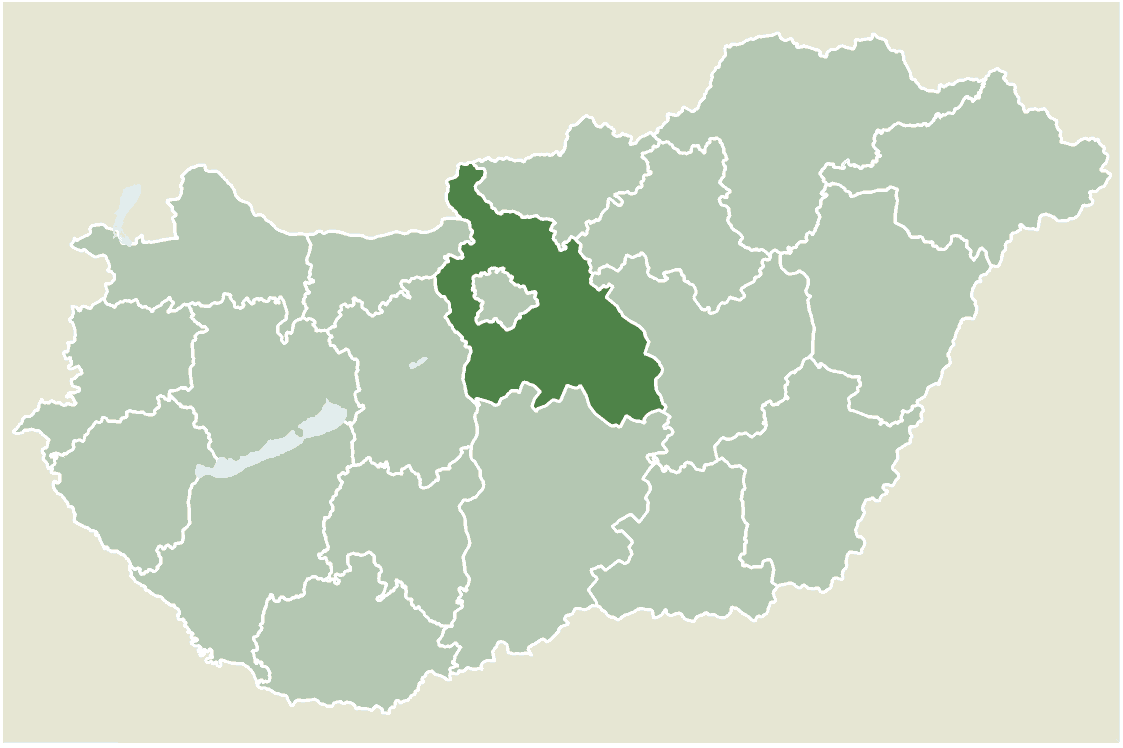
- Location of Pest county in Hungary

- Location of Üllő
- Coordinates: 47.38535°N 19.34388°E
- Country: Hungary
- County: Pest

Area
  - Total: 48.12 km^{2} (18.58 sq mi)

Population (2025)
  - Total: 12,693
  - Density: 244.78/km^{2} (634.0/sq mi)
- Time zone: UTC+1 (CET)
  - Summer (DST): UTC+2 (CEST)
- Postal code: 2225
- Area code: 29

Üllő is a town in Pest County, Hungary. It is around 25 km (16 mi) south-east of the centre of Budapest. As of 1 January 2025 it had a population of 12,693. The mayor of Üllő is Péter Tóth who was elected on 9 June 2024.

== Twin towns ==
- Ebeleben, Germany (1990)
