= Ráckeve District =

Coordinates: 47.1667°N 18.9500°E

Ráckeve District Ráckevei járás
- Districts of Hungary
- Coat of arms

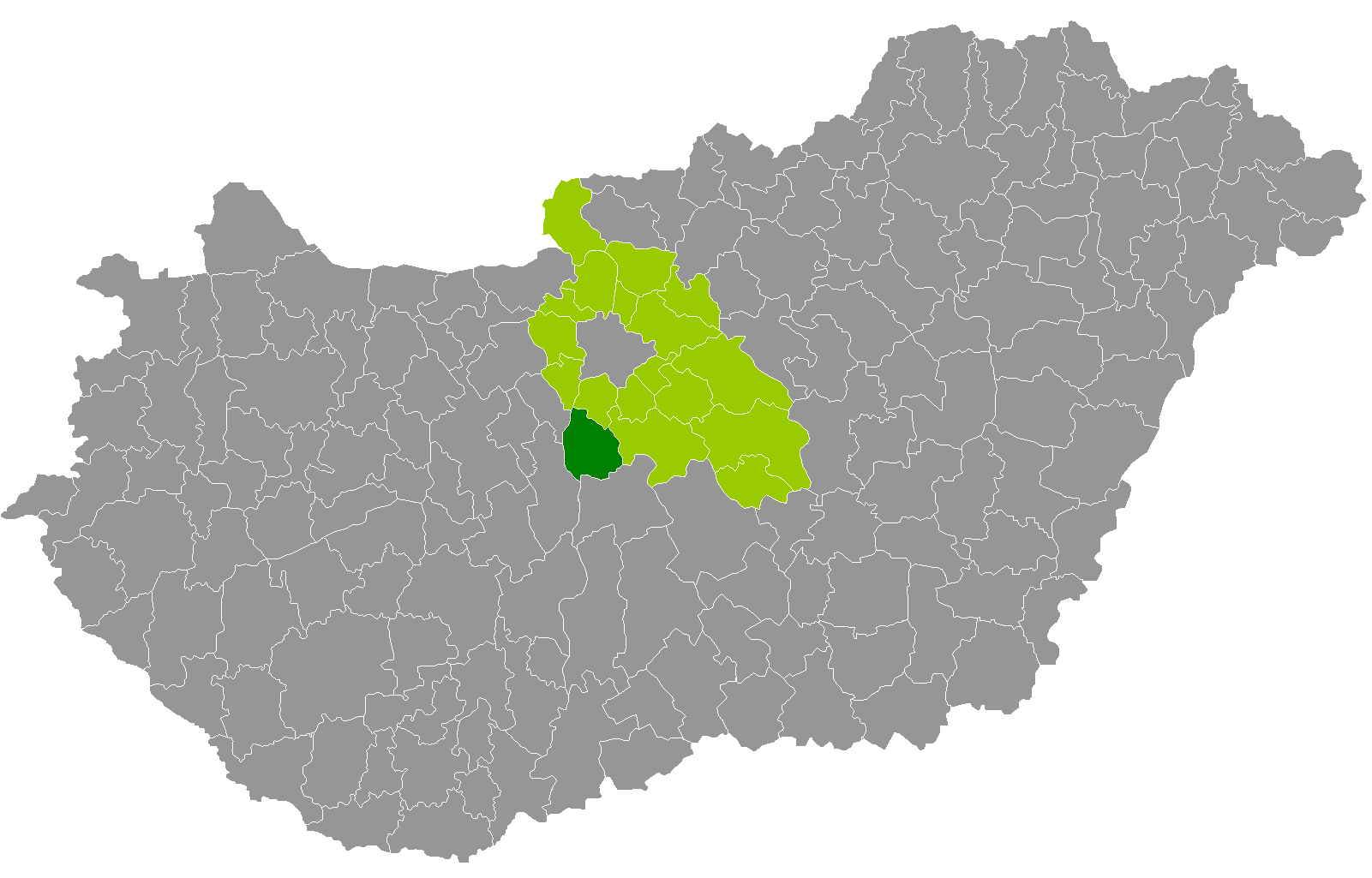
- Ráckeve District within Hungary and Pest County.
- Country: Hungary
- County: Pest
- District seat: Ráckeve

Area
  - Total: 417.05 km^{2} (161.02 sq mi)
  - Rank: 6th in Pest

Population (2011 census)
  - Total: 35,732
  - Rank: 16th in Pest
  - Density: 86/km^{2} (220/sq mi)

Ráckeve (Hungarian: Ráckevei járás) is a district in southern part of Pest County. Ráckeve is also the name of the town where the district seat is found. The district is located in the Central Hungary Statistical Region.

== Geography ==
Ráckeve District borders with Szigetszentmiklós District to the north, Dabas District to the east, Kunszentmiklós District (Bács-Kiskun County) to the south, Dunaújváros District and Martonvásár District (Fejér County) to the west. The number of the inhabited places in Ráckeve District is 11.

== Municipalities ==
The district has 1 town, 2 large villages and 8 villages. (ordered by population, as of 1 January 2013)

- Apaj (1,224)
- Áporka (1,121)
- Dömsöd (5,795)
- Kiskunlacháza (8,855)
- Lórév (292)
- Makád (1,192)
- **Ráckeve** (9,965) – district seat
- Szigetbecse (1,304)
- Szigetcsép (2,282)
- Szigetszentmárton (2,133)
- Szigetújfalu (1,957)

The bolded municipality is city, italics municipalities are large villages.

== Demographics ==
Religion in Ráckeve District (2011 census)
1. Catholic Church (36.0%)
2. Greek Catholicism (0.60%)
3. Calvinism (22.7%)
4. Lutheranism (0.40%)
5. Orthodoxy (0.70%)
6. Other religions (1.30%)
7. Non-religious (11.8%)
8. Atheists (0.90%)
9. Undeclared (25.6%)

In 2011, it had a population of 35,732 and the population density was 86/km².

Year	County population	Change
2011	35,732	n/a

=== Ethnicity ===
Besides the Hungarian majority, the main minorities are the German (approx. 1,250), Roma (800), Serb (300) and Romanian (100).

Total population (2011 census): 35,732
Ethnic groups (2011 census): Identified themselves: 33,858 persons:

- Hungarians: 30,997 (91.55%)
- Germans: 1,236 (3.65%)
- Gypsies: 775 (2.29%)
- Others and indefinable: 850 (2.51%)

Approx. 2,000 persons in Ráckeve District did not declare their ethnic group at the 2011 census.

=== Religion ===
Religious adherence in the county according to 2011 census:

- Catholic – 13,063 (Roman Catholic – 12,868; Greek Catholic – 195);
- Reformed – 8,123;
- Orthodox – 254;
- Evangelical – 150;
- other religions – 473;
- Non-religious – 4,199;
- Atheism – 318;
- Undeclared – 9,152.

== Gallery ==
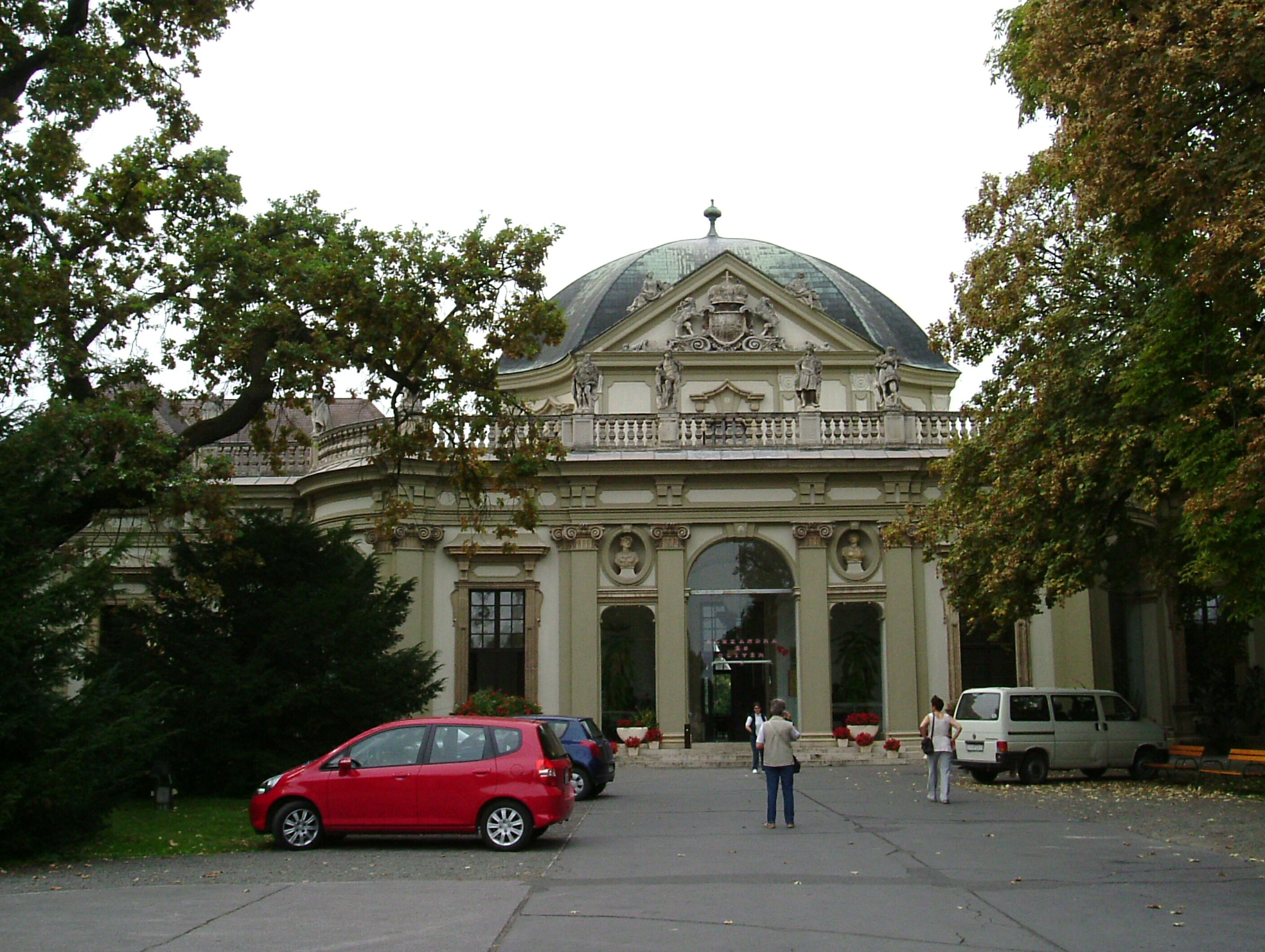
Savoy Castle in Ráckeve

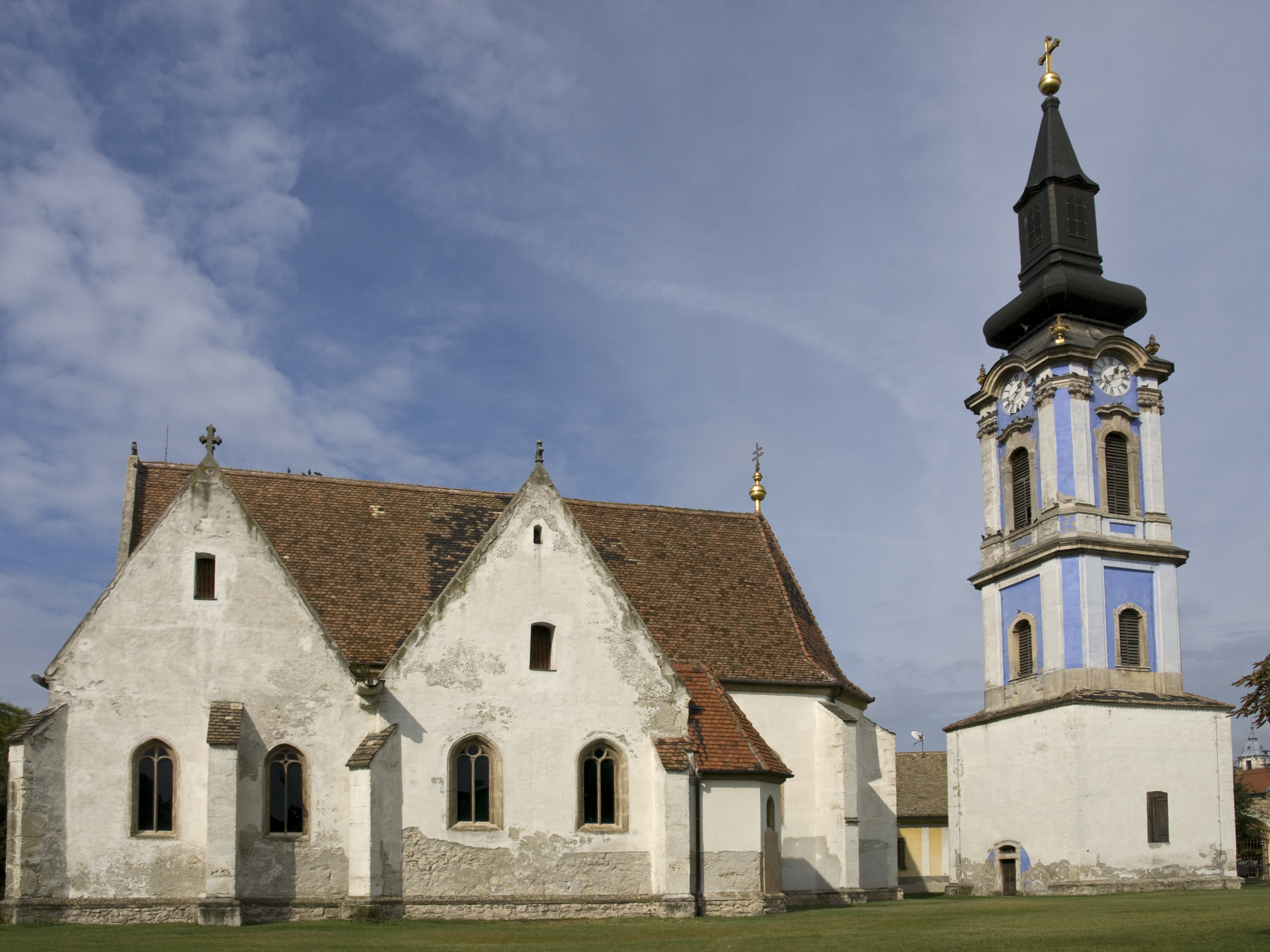
Serbian Church of Our Lady in Ráckeve

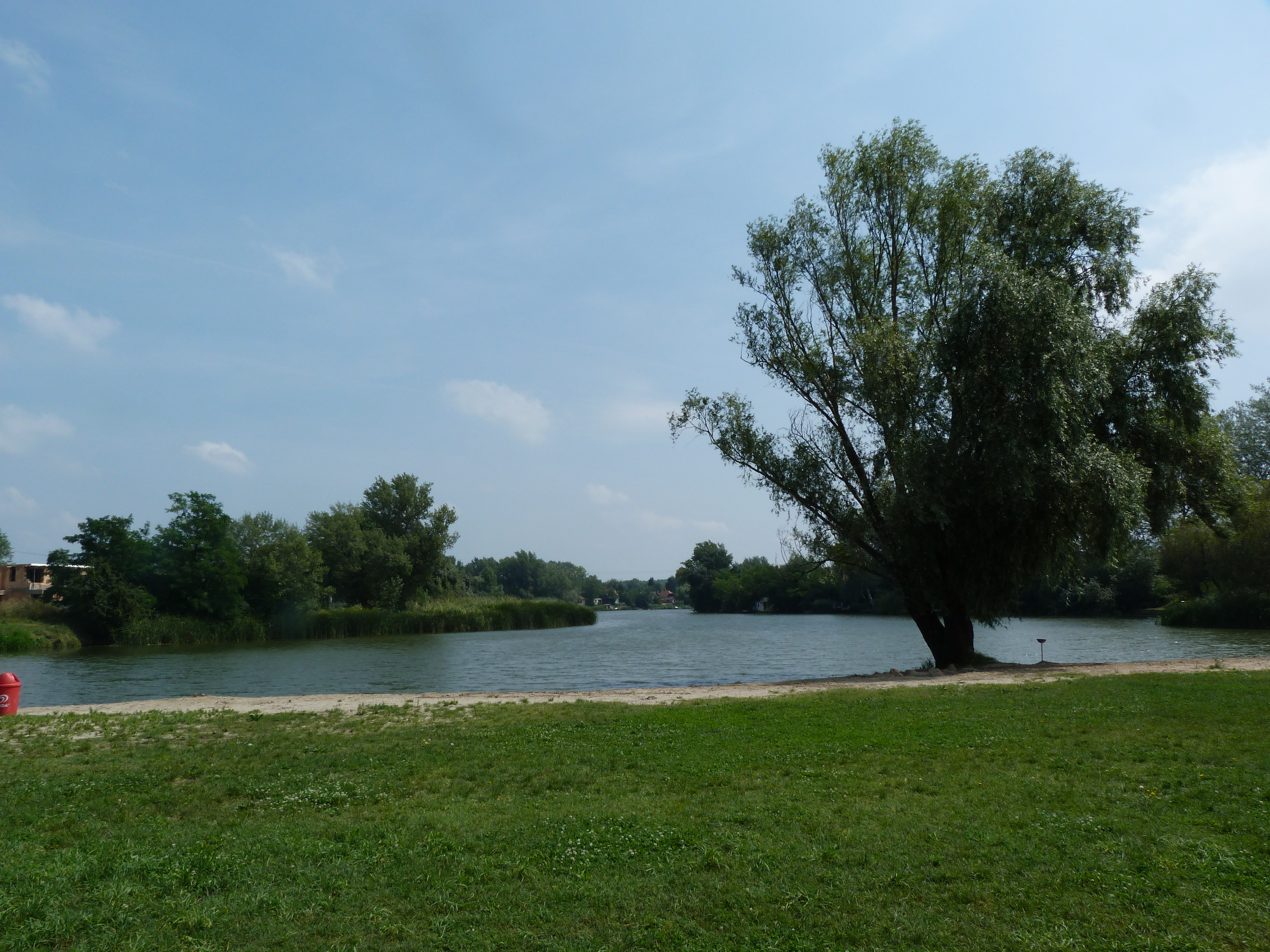
Landscape in Szigetcsép

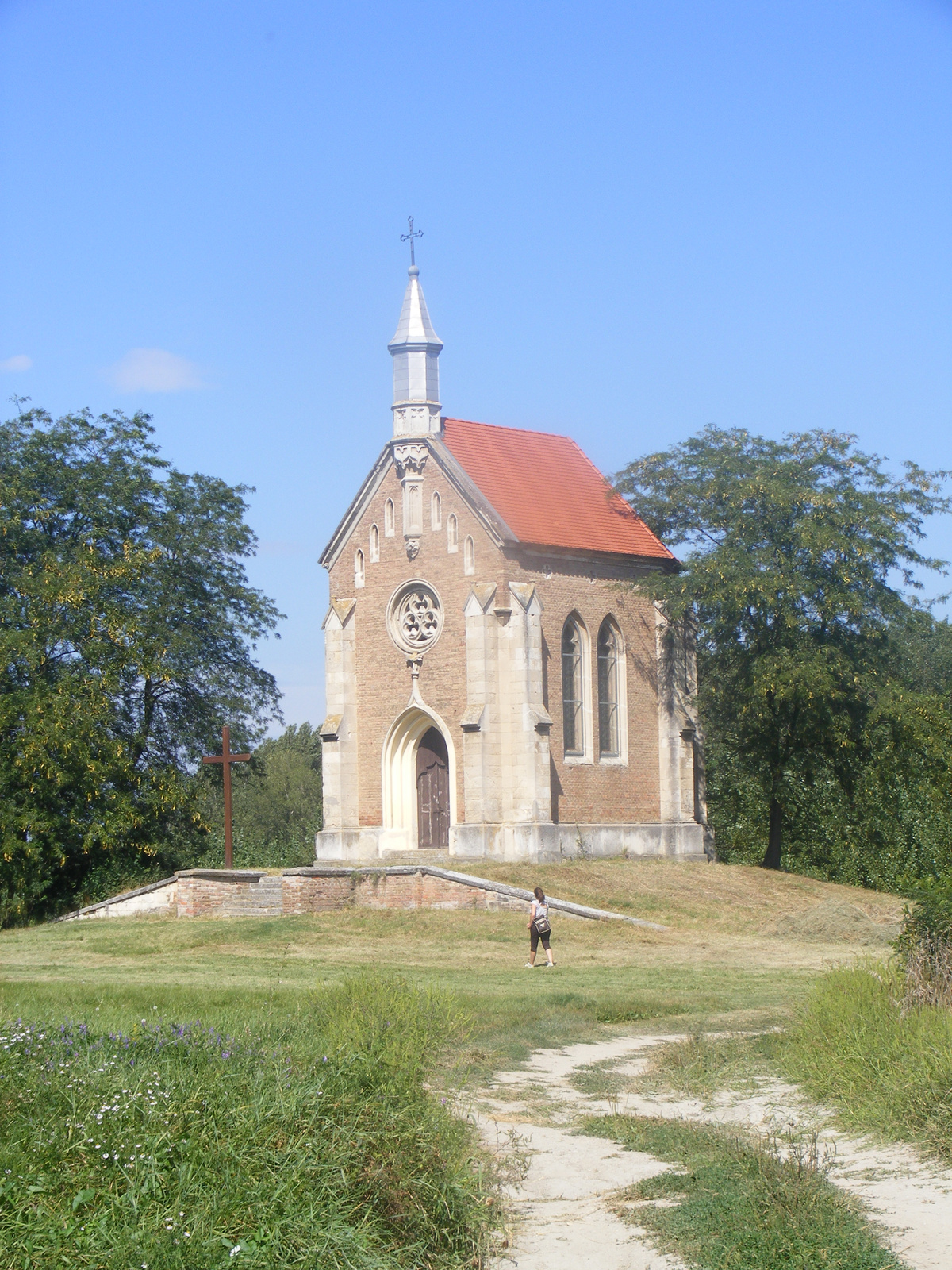
Zichy Memorial Chapel near Lórév

== See also ==
- List of cities and towns in Hungary
