= Serbs of Hungary =

Ethnic group

Magyarországi szerbek Срби у Мађарској Srbi u Mađarskoj
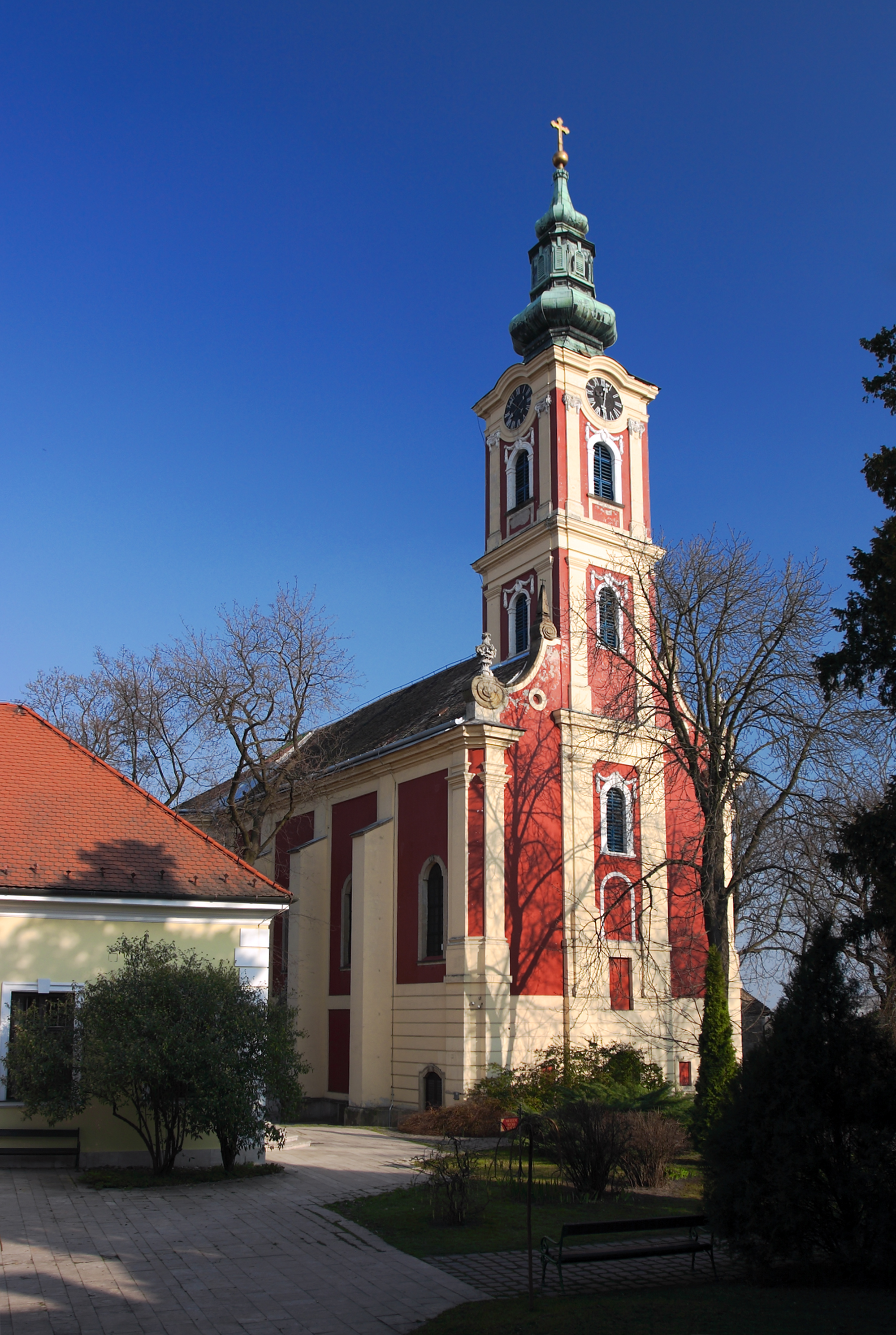
- Serbian Orthodox Cathedral of the Dormition of the Theotokos in Szentendre

Total population
- 11,622 (2022)

Regions with significant populations
- Budapest, Csongrád, Pest, Bács-Kiskun

Languages
- Hungarian and Serbian

Religion
- Eastern Orthodoxy (Serbian Orthodox Church)

Serbs are a recognized ethnic minority in Hungary. Throughout the history of Hungary, Serbs were present in various regions of the former Kingdom of Hungary, and also in modern Hungary, since 1918. According to data from the 2022 census, the population of ethnic Serbs in Hungary is 11,622, constituting 0.1% of the total population.

== History ==
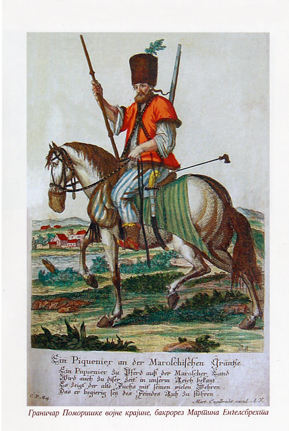
Serb frontiersman from Pomorišje, 18th century

The presence of Serbs in the territory of present-day Hungary date from the Middle Ages. The mother of the Hungarian king Géza II (1141-1162) was Helena of Serbia, a daughter of Uroš I, ruler of the Grand Principality of Serbia. During the rule of Géza II, her brother Beloš Vukanović was a palatine of the Kingdom of Hungary. When Hungarians under Árpád arrived to the Pannonian Basin in 896, they encountered there Slavic, Avar, and other populations. These populations however were quickly assimilated. The Serbs who later migrated into the Pannonian Basin from the Balkans, were the descendants of those Slavs who in the 7th century migrated from the Pannonian Basin southwards into the Balkan peninsula.

Since the 14th century, escaping from the Ottoman threat, a large number of Serbs migrated to the Kingdom of Hungary where many of them served as soldiers. Matthias Corvinus and his successors are known to have welcomed Serbs from the other side of the Danube, giving the exiled military commanders fiefdoms to rule and defend from the Ottomans. After the Battle of Mohács in 1526, much of the territory of present-day Hungary came under Ottoman administration. During Ottoman administration towns in the territory of present-day Hungary began decaying and the former Hungarian and German population left them. In that time, especially in the 17th century, many Serb, and other South Slavic migrants settled in the territory of present-day Hungary.

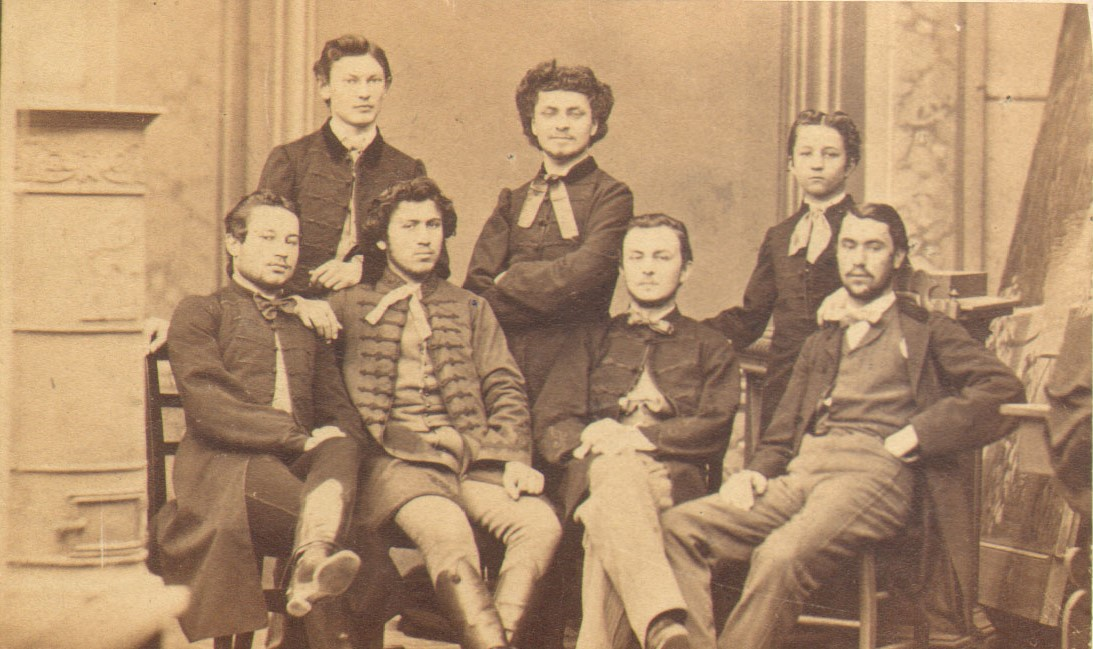
Members of the Serbian Student Literary Society in Pécs, 1870s

After territory of present-day Hungary came under Habsburg administration, a new wave of Serb refugees from the Balkans migrated to the area in 1690, as a consequence of the Habsburg-Ottoman war. This migration, called the Great Migrations of the Serbs, was not a single organized campaign but a series of waves of migration. In 1698, more than a half of population of Pécs were South Slavic (including Serbs). In 1715, the population of Buda numbered 1,539 houses, of which 769 were South Slavic (mostly Serb). In 1715, the population of Baja numbered 237 houses, of which 216 were South Slavic (Serb and Bunjevac). In 1720, 88% of population of Szentendre were South Slavic (mostly Serbs). In 1720, the population of Szeged numbered 193 houses, of which 99 were Serb. During the 18th and 19th century, however, the Hungarian-Serb ethnic border moved southward and fixed in the territory of present-day Serbian province of Vojvodina.

Following the dissolution of Austria-Hungary in 1918, the Serbian Army and South Slavic People's Administration from Novi Sad controlled not only present-day Vojvodina, but also southern parts of present-day Hungary. The Treaty of Trianon from 1920 defined the border between Hungary and the Kingdom of Serbs, Croats, and Slovenes and assigned most of Baranya and the northernmost part of Bačka (around city of Baja) to Hungary. As a response to this, a short-lived Serb-Hungarian Baranya-Baja Republic was formed in this area in 1921. The president of the republic was Serb, Petar Dobrović. After the Serb-Croat-Slovene army evacuated the territory of the Baranya-Baja Republic the two countries signed the Citizenship Treaty according to which Serbs in Hungary gained right to opt for citizenship of the Kingdom of Serbs, Croats, and Slovenes. About two-thirds of the Serbs (called optants) left Hungary in the following decade. Almost the whole Serb population of Sárok, Deszk, Újszentiván, Szőreg, Majs, and Dunaszekcső became optants and left Hungary.

== Demographics ==
Year	Serbian speakers
1910	26,248
1920	17,132
1930	7,031
1941	5,442
1980	3,426
1990	2,953
2001	3,388
2011	3,708
2022	4,249

In the 17th and 18th centuries large Serb communities existed throughout Hungary, notably in Buda, Baja, Szentendre, and Szeged. After the dissolution of Austria-Hungary in 1918 and after new borders were defined by the Treaty of Trianon in 1920, the population of Serbs in Hungary has drastically diminished with only a fraction remaining within the borders of post-Trianon Hungary.

According to data from the 2022 census, 11,622 people in Hungary identified as ethnic Serbs and 4,249 declared their mother tongue as Serbian.

Small Serb communities are scattered mostly in the southern part of the country, near the border with Serbia, where they usually make up from 2 to 5% of the population (up to around 240 ethnic Serbs at most): Battonya (241 ethnic Serbs or 4.8% of total population), Deszk (115 or 2.9%), Hercegszántó (61 or 3.7%). There are couple of settlements with Serb communities in wider Budapest region (Pest County), on the Csepel Island: Lórév (Serbian: Ловра / Lovra) - the only settlement with an ethnic Serb majority in Hungary (154 or 51%), and Szigetcsép (67 or 2.4%).

Most ethnic Serbs nowadays are to be found in cities and towns. In Budapest, ethnic Serbs form 7th largest ethnic group with 2,818 people or 0.1% of city's population. In Szeged, third-largest city in Hungary, Serbs form 4th largest ethnic group with 758 people or 0.4% of city's population. There are also small Serb communities in towns of Baja (131 or 0.4%) and Szentendre (114 or 0.4%).

Serbs in Hungary predominantly belong to the Eastern Orthodoxy with the Serbian Orthodox Church as the traditional church (through its diocese, the Eparchy of Buda).

== Heritage ==
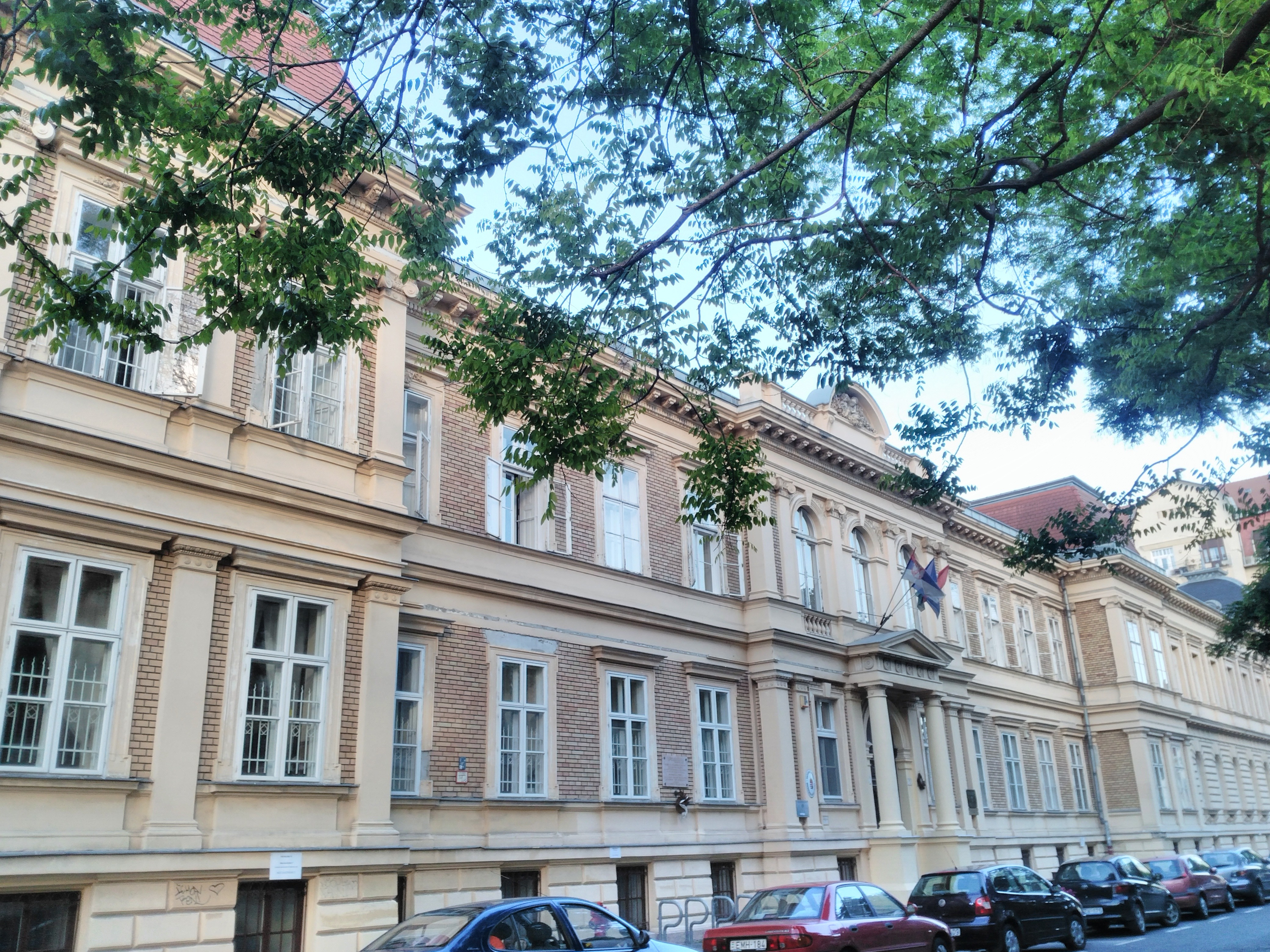
Nikola Tesla Serbian School, Budapest

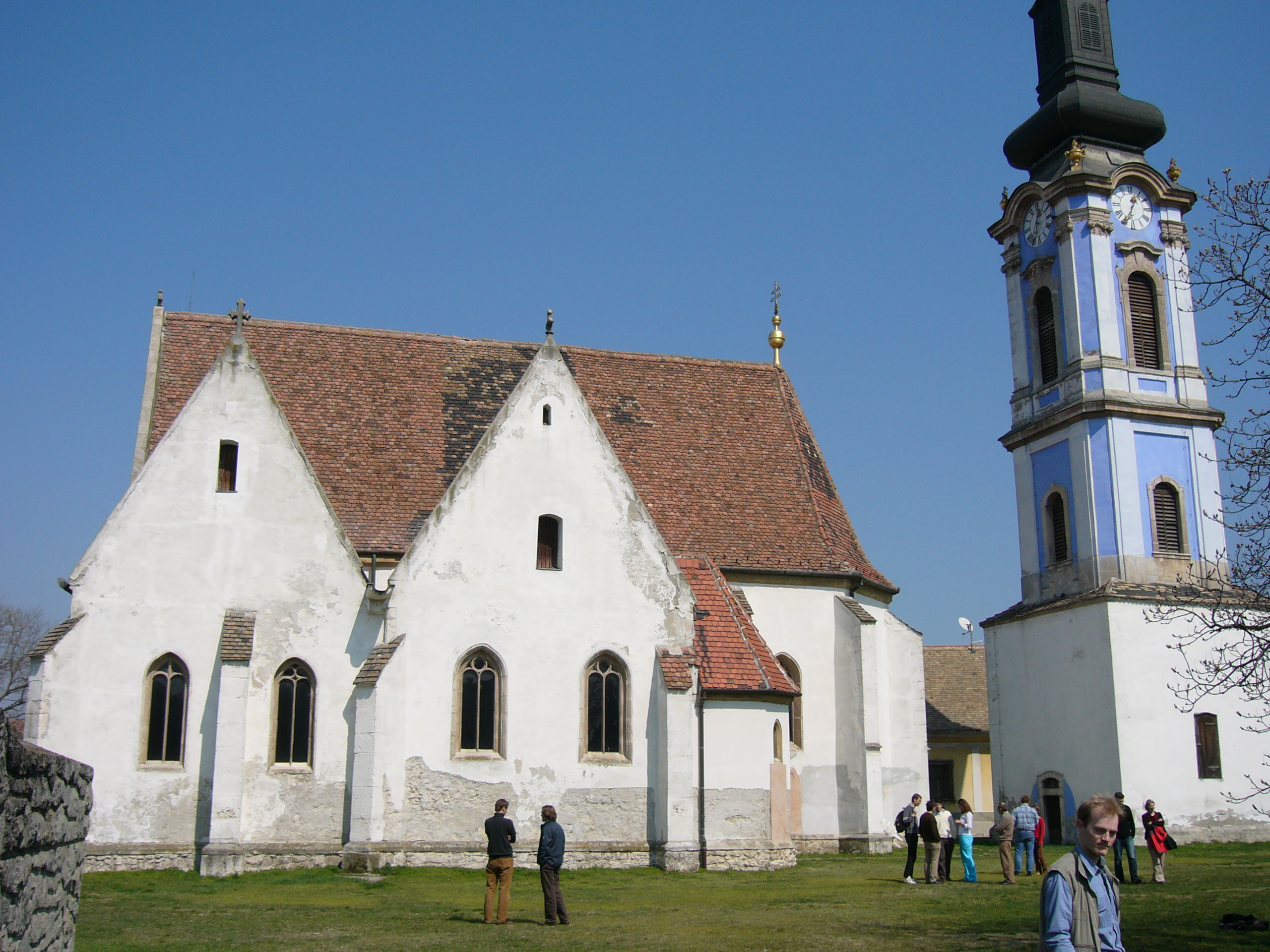
Serbian Kovin Monastery, built in 1487

Serbs left a valuable architectural heritage in Hungary. The number of Serbian Orthodox churches is far higher than would be expected by the small size of contemporary Serb population in Hungary. These baroque churches were mostly built in the 18th and 19th centuries when Serb merchants formed rich and influential communities in Hungarian towns. Village churches show the historical presence of Serbs even in many places from where they absolutely disappeared by now.

The most complex example of Serb architectural heritage in Hungary is the old town of Szentendre, with seven Serbian Orthodox churches, brightly coloured merchant houses, the Museum of Serbian Orthodox Heritage, and the Archives of the Eparchy of Buda.

In Budapest, there is an old Serbian Orthodox church in Serb Street and the famous Serb college, Thökölyanum (Serbian: Tekelijanum).

Serbian Orthodox churches are to be found in following cities and towns: Szeged, Győr, Eger, Székesfehérvár (with a Serbian open-air village museum), Baja (two churches), Hódmezővásárhely, Vác, Esztergom, Pomáz, Mohács, Siklós. Serbian Orthodox village churches are in Csobánka (Čobanac), Lórév (Lovra), Szigetcsép (Čip), Budakalász (Kalaz), Magyarcsanád (Čanad), Battonya (Batanja), Deszk (Deska), Dunaújváros (Pantelija), Százhalombatta (Bata), Dunaföldvár (Feldvar), Alsónána (Donja Nana), Medina (Medina), Illocska (Iločac), Magyarbóly (Madžarboja), Dunaszekcső (Sečuj), Villány (Viljan), Sárok (Šarok), Majs (Majš), Lippó (Lipova), Beremend (Breme), Erdősmecske (Racmečka), Somberek (Šumberak).

There are two Serbian Orthodox monasteries: Serbian Kovin Monastery (Srpski Kovin) in Ráckeve, rare example of Serb Gothic architecture from the 15th century, and Grábóc (Grabovac).

== Notable people ==
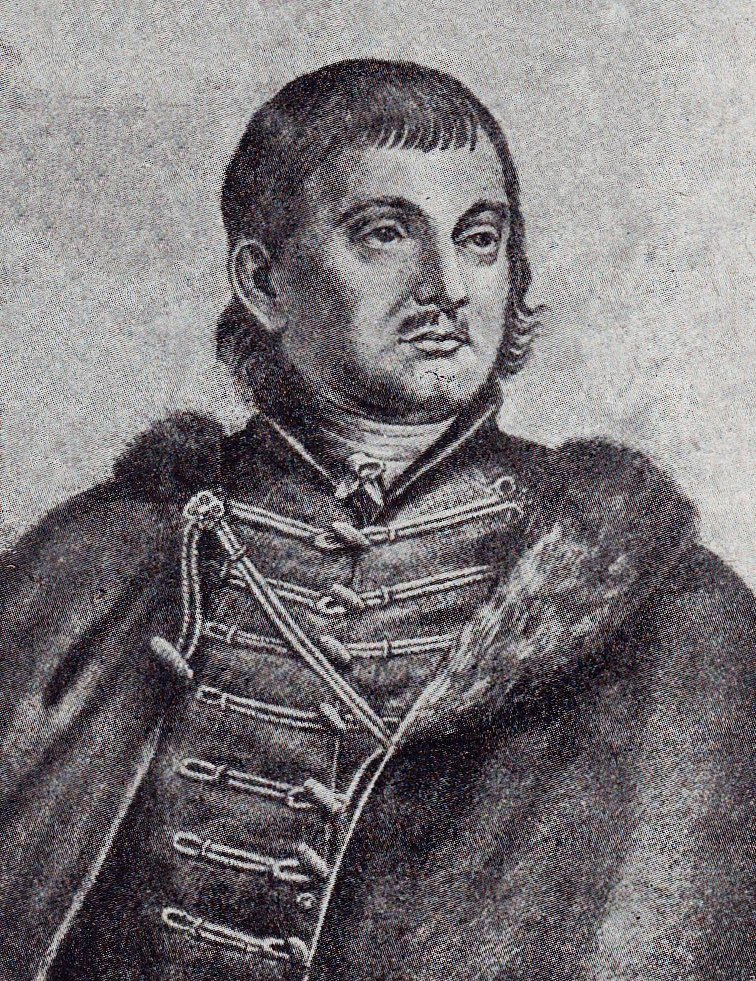
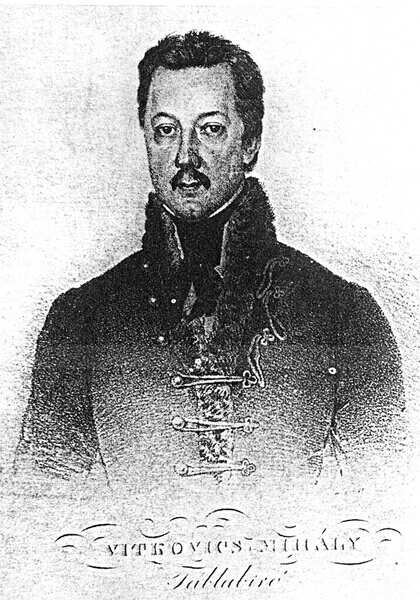
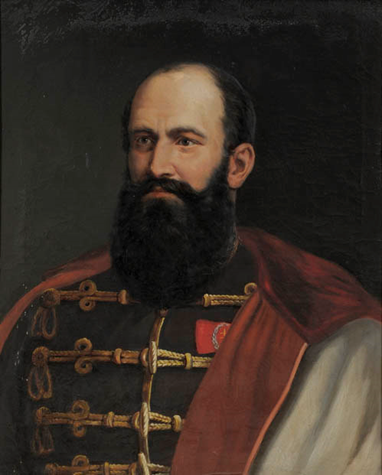
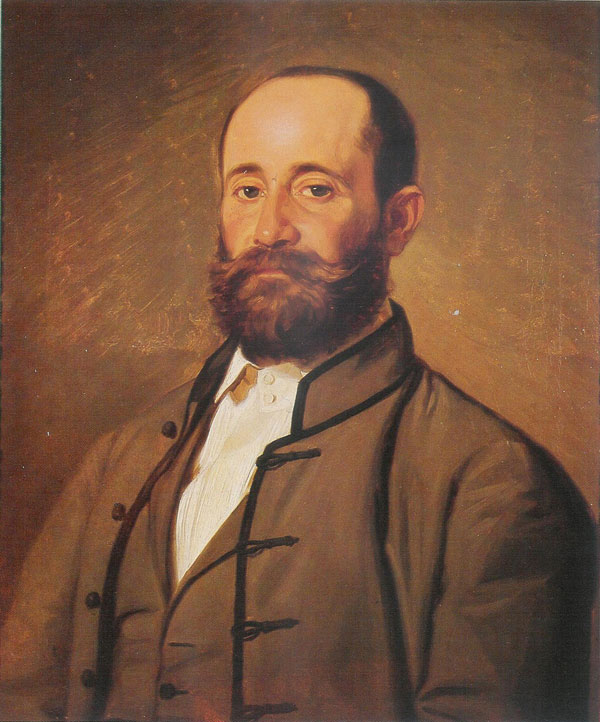
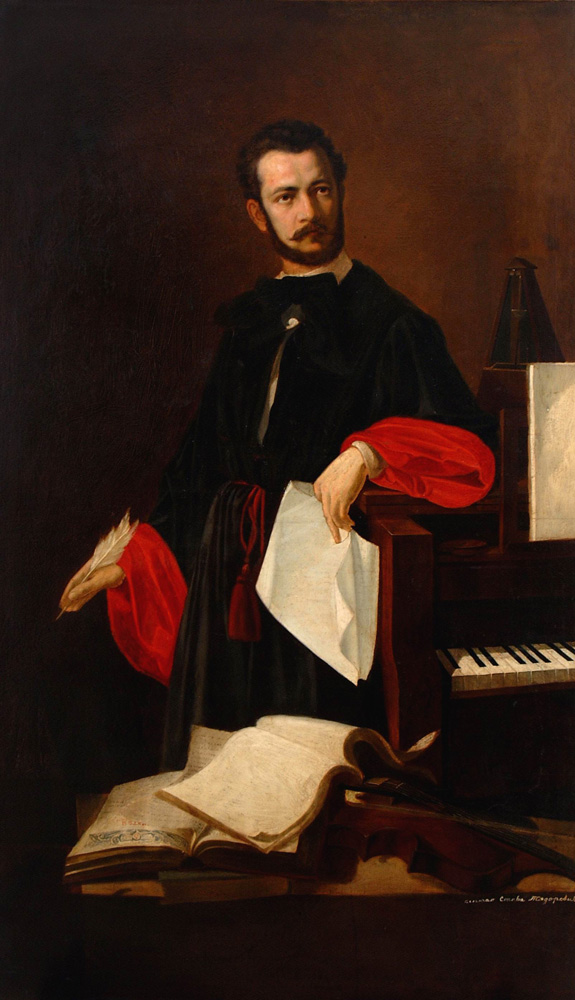
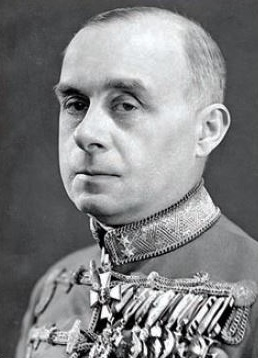
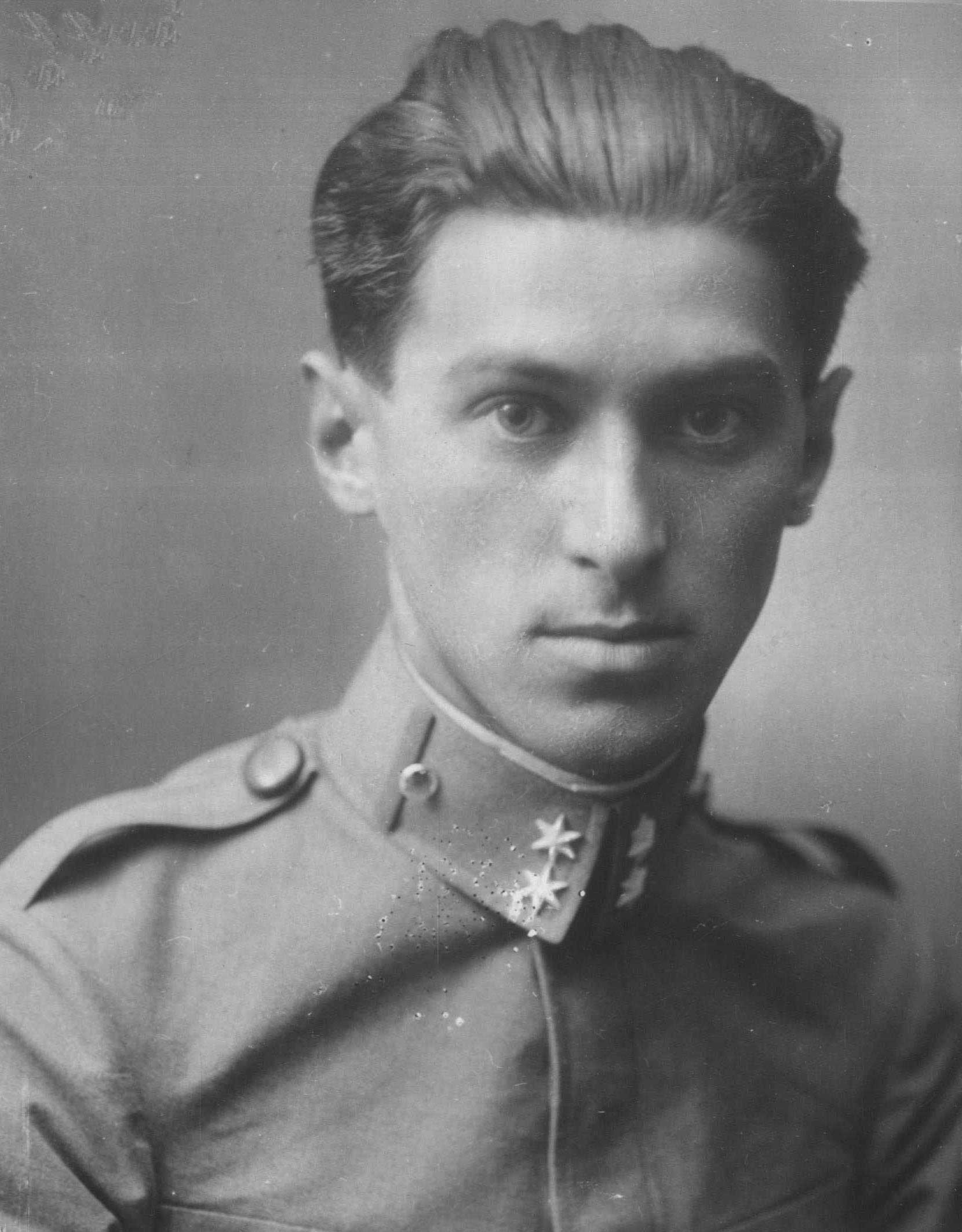
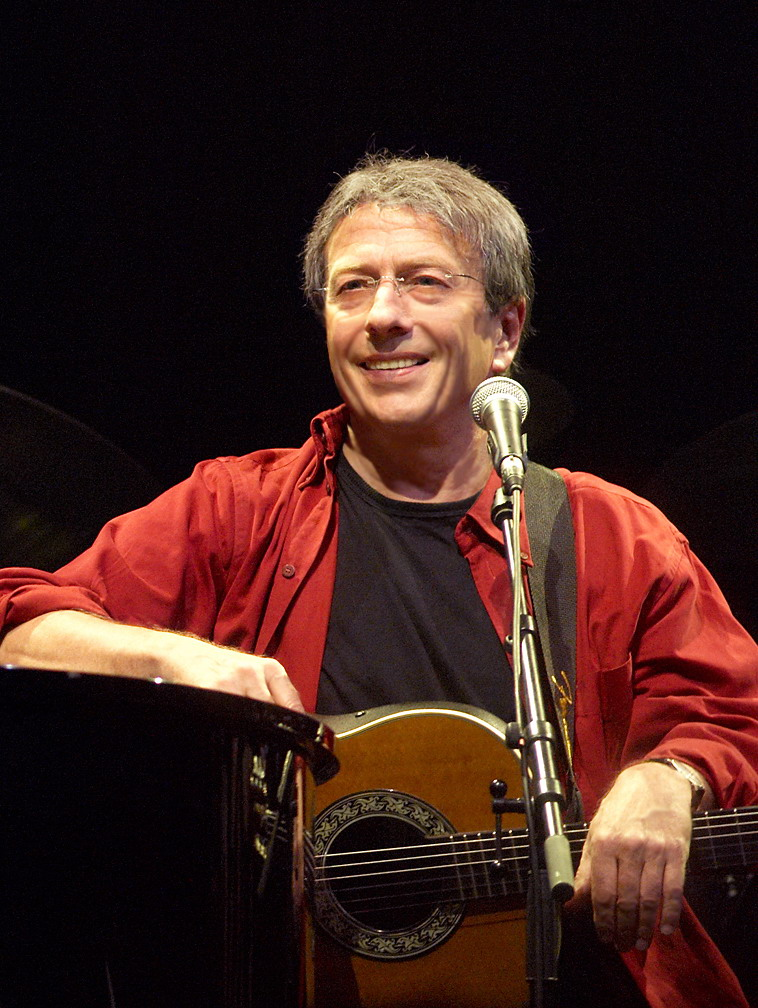
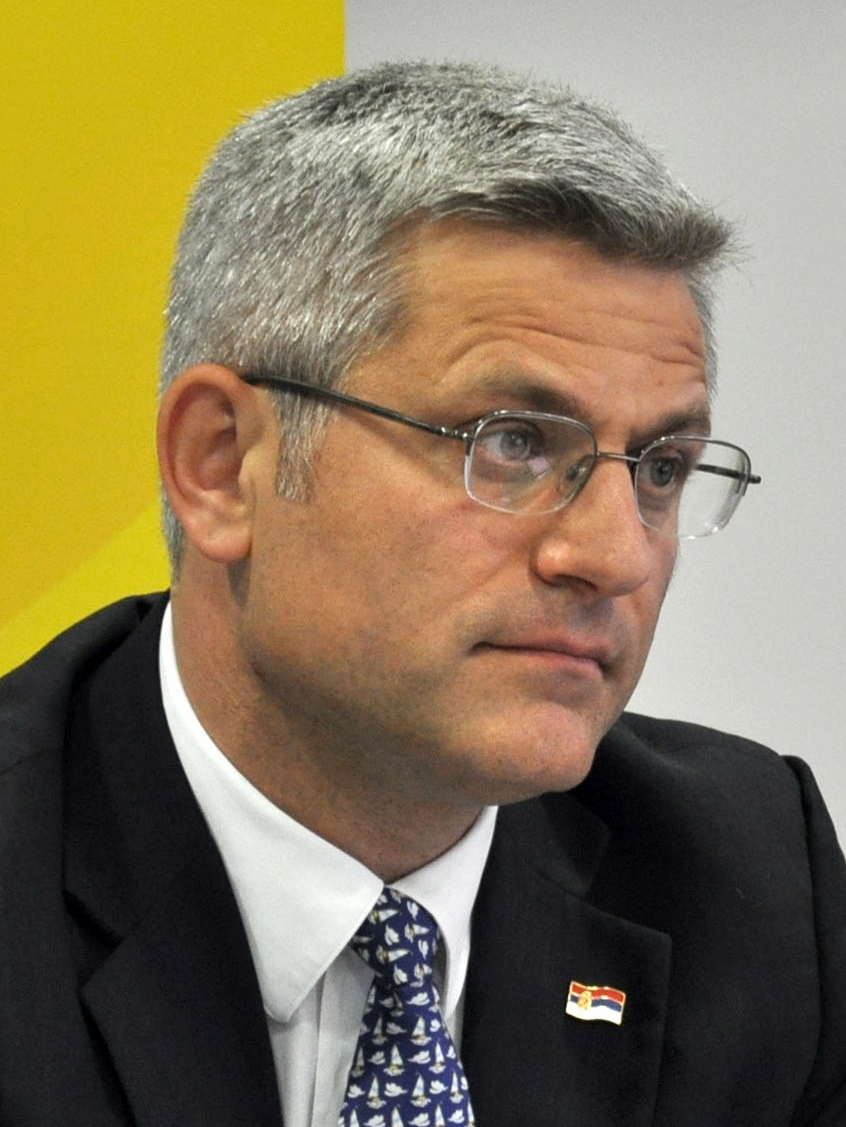
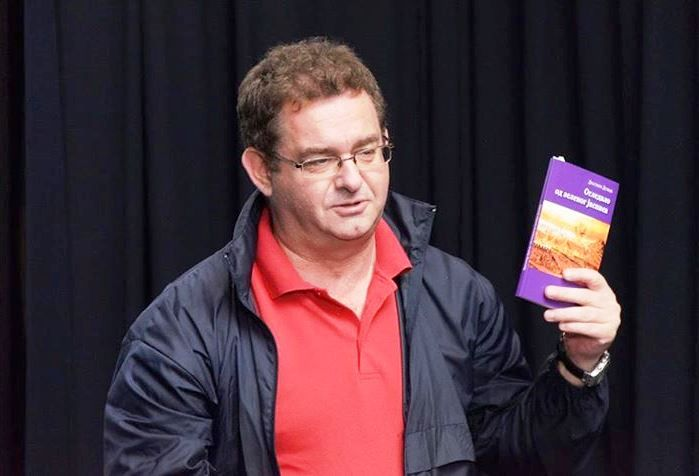
Joakim Vujić	Mihailo Vitković	János Damjanich	Jakov Ignjatović	Kornelije Stanković	Döme Sztójay	Miloš Crnjanski	Rajko Tomović	Zorán Sztevanovity	Radovan Jelašić	Dragomir Dujmov

- Helena – Queen consort of Hungary
- Jovan Avakumović – poet
- Miloš Crnjanski – writer
- János Damjanich – general
- Petar Dobrović – painter and politician
- Dragomir Dujmov – poet
- Jakov Ignjatović – writer
- Radovan Jelašić – economist, governor of the National Bank of Serbia
- Vikentije Jovanović – Metropolitan of Karlovci
- Gáspár Károlyi – Calvinist reformer
- Milos Kerkez – football player
- Fedor Nikolics – politician
- Jovan Pačić – poet and officer
- Soma Orlai Petrich – painter, paternal Serb descent
- Kornelije Stanković – composer
- Zorán Sztevanovity – musician
- Döme Sztójay – the Prime Minister of Hungary
- Momcsilló Tapavicza – athlete, Hungarian Olympic medalist
- Rajko Tomović – scientist
- Emil Uzelac – aviator
- Mihailo Vitković – poet
- Sebo Vukovics – politician
- Joakim Vujić – writer

== See also ==
- Hungary–Serbia relations
- Eparchy of Buda

== Sources and further reading ==
- Adler, Philip J. (1976). "Serbs, Magyars, and Staatsinteresse in Eighteenth Century Austria: A Study in the History of Habsburg Administration". Austrian History Yearbook. 12 (1): 116–147.
- Andrić, Stanko (2016). "Saint John Capistran and Despot George Branković: An Impossible Compromise". Byzantinoslavica. 74 (1–2): 202–227.
- Bataković, Dušan T., ed. (2005). Histoire du peuple serbe [History of the Serbian People] (in French). Lausanne: L’Age d’Homme. ISBN 9782825119587.
- Ćirković, Sima (2004). The Serbs. Malden: Blackwell Publishing. ISBN 9781405142915.
- Dávid, Géza; Fodor, Pál, eds. (1994). Hungarian-Ottoman Military and Diplomatic Relations in the Age of Süleyman the Magnificent. Budapest: Loránd Eötvös University, Hungarian Academy of Sciences, Institute of History. ISBN 9789638312310.
- Engel, Pál (2001). The Realm of St. Stephen: A History of Medieval Hungary, 895-1526. London & New York: I.B.Tauris. ISBN 9781850439776.
- Fine, John Van Antwerp Jr. (1991) [1983]. The Early Medieval Balkans: A Critical Survey from the Sixth to the Late Twelfth Century. Ann Arbor, Michigan: University of Michigan Press. ISBN 0472081497.
- Fine, John Van Antwerp Jr. (1994) [1987]. The Late Medieval Balkans: A Critical Survey from the Late Twelfth Century to the Ottoman Conquest. Ann Arbor, Michigan: University of Michigan Press. ISBN 0472082604.
- Fodor, Pál; Dávid, Géza, eds. (2000). Ottomans, Hungarians, and Habsburgs in Central Europe: The Military Confines in the Era of Ottoman Conquest. Leiden: BRILL. ISBN 9004119078.
- Gavrilović, Slavko (1993). "Serbs in Hungary, Slavonia and Croatia in struggles against the Turks (15th-18th centuries)". Serbs in European Civilization. Belgrade: Nova, Serbian Academy of Sciences and Arts, Institute for Balkan Studies. pp. 41–54. ISBN 9788675830153.
- Isailović, Neven G.; Krstić, Aleksandar R. (2015). "Serbian Language and Cyrillic Script as a Means of Diplomatic Literacy in South Eastern Europe in 15th and 16th Centuries" ( (PDF)). Literacy Experiences concerning Medieval and Early Modern Transylvania. Cluj-Napoca: George Barițiu Institute of History. pp. 185–195. Archived from the original on 2024-06-07.
- Ilić-Mandić, Jelena (2025). "Collective Identity(ies) in the 18th-Century Military Frontier: A Study of the Serbian Case" (PDF). Concepts of Nationalism and Patriotism in Serbian Political Discourse: Medieval, Modern, Contemporary. Belgrade: Faculty of Philosophy. pp. 77–82.
- Ivić, Pavle, ed. (1995). The History of Serbian Culture. Edgware: Porthill Publishers. ISBN 9781870732314.
- Jireček, Constantin (1911). Geschichte der Serben. Vol. 1. Gotha: Perthes.
- Jireček, Constantin (1918). Geschichte der Serben. Vol. 2. Gotha: Perthes.
- Krestić, Vasilije (2015). "The Serbs in Hungary during the First World War". The Serbs and the First World War 1914-1918. Belgrade: Serbian Academy of Sciences and Arts. pp. 43–56. ISBN 9788670256590.
- Krstić, Aleksandar R. (2017). "Which Realm will You Opt for? – The Serbian Nobility Between the Ottomans and the Hungarians in the 15th Century". State and Society in the Balkans Before and After Establishment of Ottoman Rule. Belgrade: Institute of History, Yunus Emre Enstitüsü Turkish Cultural Centre. pp. 129–163. ISBN 9788677431259.
- Krstić, Aleksandar R. (2025). "Between Serving the Holy Crown and Keeping Serbian Traditions – On the Identity of the Serbs in Hungary in the Second Half of the 15th and the First Half of the 16th Centuries" (PDF). Concepts of Nationalism and Patriotism in Serbian Political Discourse: Medieval, Modern, Contemporary. Belgrade: Faculty of Philosophy. pp. 65–70.
- Pálosfalvi, Tamás (2018). From Nicopolis to Mohács: A History of Ottoman-Hungarian Warfare, 1389-1526. Leiden: BRILL. ISBN 9789004375659.
- Prelić, Mladena (2003). "Ethnic identity: The Serbs in Hungary" (PDF). Glasnik Etnografskog instituta. 50–51 (2002-2003): 71–78.
- Simić, Vladimir (2025). "Religion, Dynasty and Enlightenment: Serbian Patriotism in the Habsburg Monarchy in the 18th Century" (PDF). Concepts of Nationalism and Patriotism in Serbian Political Discourse: Medieval, Modern, Contemporary. Belgrade: Faculty of Philosophy. pp. 88–91.
- Točanac-Radović, Isidora (2022). "The Great Migration of Serbs and the Question of the Serbian Ethnic and Religious Community in the Habsburg Monarchy". Migrations in the Slavic Cultural Space: From the Middle Ages to the Present Day. Łódź: Łódź University Press. pp. 15–27.
- Točanac-Radović, Isidora (2025). "Natio nostra Illyrico-Rasciana seu Serviana: The Creation of a Privileged Identity of Serbs in the Habsburg Monarchy" (PDF). Concepts of Nationalism and Patriotism in Serbian Political Discourse: Medieval, Modern, Contemporary. Belgrade: Faculty of Philosophy. pp. 83–87.
- Todorović, Jelena (2006). An Orthodox Festival Book in the Habsburg Empire: Zaharija Orfelin's Festive Greeting to Mojsej Putnik (1757). Aldershot: Ashgate Publishing. ISBN 9780754656111.
