= Lórév =

Lórév Ловра
- Coat of arms
- Interactive map of Lórév
- Coordinates: 47°07′N 18°54′E
- Country: Hungary
- County: Pest County

Government
  - Mayor: György Bogdán

Area
  - Total: 9.88 km^{2} (3.81 sq mi)

Population (2025)
  - Total: 294
  - Density: 29.8/km^{2} (77.1/sq mi)

Population by ethnicity (2022)
  - Hungarian: 83,2%
  - Serbian: 45,2%
  - Bulgarian: 2,4%
  - Gypsy: 1,0%
  - Croat: 0,7%
  - Slovenian: 0,3%
  - Other: 1,4%
  - Unreported: 12,7%

Population by religion (2022)
  - Orthodox: 37,0%
  - Roman Catholic: 12,7%
  - Reformed: 9,6%
  - Greek Catholic: 0,3%
  - Non religious: 5,8%
  - Unreported: 34,6%
- Time zone: UTC+1 (CET)
  - Summer (DST): UTC+2 (CEST)
- Postal code: 2309
- Area code: 24

Lórév (Serbian: Ловра, Lovra) is a village on Csepel Island in Hungary. It is situated in Pest County. Lorev is the northernmost settlement in the world with an ethnic Serb majority.

== Name ==
Lórév means "horse ford" in Hungarian referring to the nearby ford of the Danube.

== Demographics ==
Lórév is the only settlement in Hungary with an ethnic Serb majority. According to the 2001 Census, village had 307 people of which some 180 (58.63%) were Serbs (and 202 people with a Serb "cultural heritage") while 39.09% of the population were Hungarians (120 people). Also, the neighbouring village of Szigetcsép and the town of Ráckeve on the Csepel Island have Serb settlements. Not far to the north the Bunjevci settlement of Tököl is to be found. A tradition of mutual weddings between these two geographically close villages existed as well as strong connections with Serbs from the villages of Medina in the south, three villages north of Budapest -- Budakalász, Pomáz and Csobánka—and the small town of Szentendre.

=== Religion ===
According to the 2001 census the religious distribution of the population included 69 Roman Catholics, 32 Calvinists and 181 Serbian Orthodox.

== See also ==
- Csepel Island
- Pest County
- Serbs in Hungary
