= Eastern Orthodoxy in Hungary =

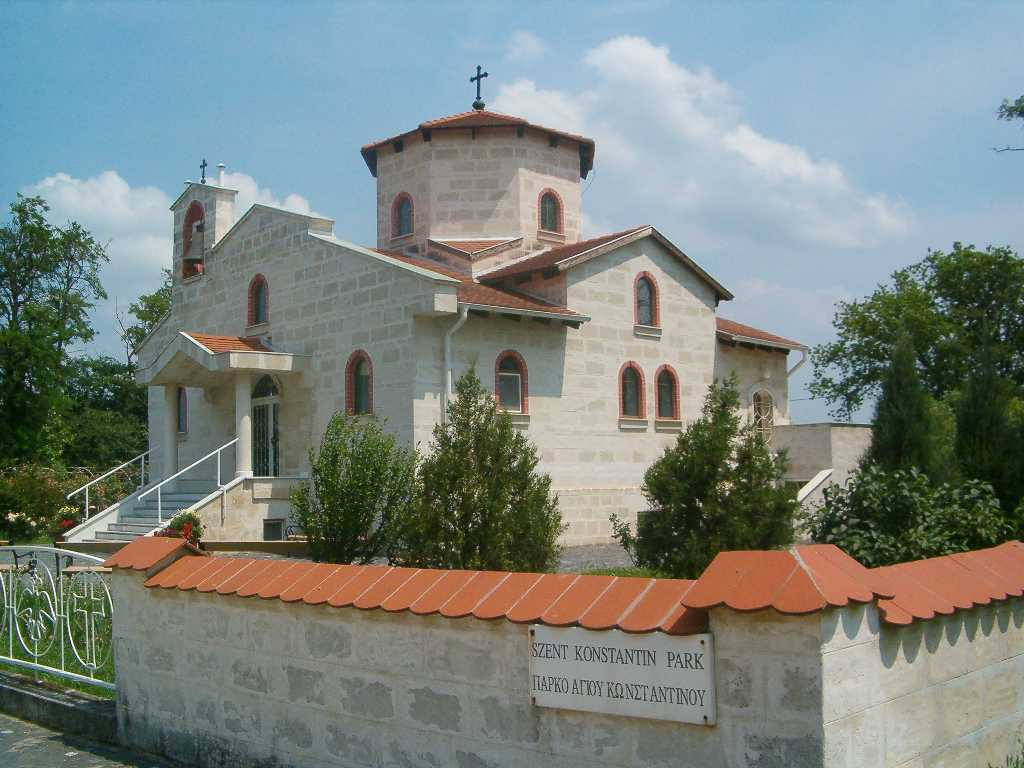
Church of the Hungarian Orthodox Exarchate of the Ecumenical Patriarchate of Constantinople in Beloiannisz

Eastern Orthodoxy in Hungary (Hungarian: Keleti ortodoxia) refers to communities, institutions and organizations of the Eastern Orthodox Christianity in Hungary. Historically, Eastern Orthodoxy was a significant denomination in the medieval and early modern Kingdom of Hungary. The first Eastern Orthodox diocese (eparchy) in Hungary was the Metropolitanate of Tourkia. It was established in 952 and subject to the Patriarchate of Constantinople. The first known record of its metropolis status was recorded in 1028.

In modern times, Eastern Orthodoxy is mainly the religion of some ethnic minorities. In the 2001 national census, only 15,928 persons declared themselves Orthodox Christians (0.21% of the people with declared religious affiliation and 0.15% of the whole population). Estimates in 2020 suggested that 1.54% of the population was Orthodox.

== History ==
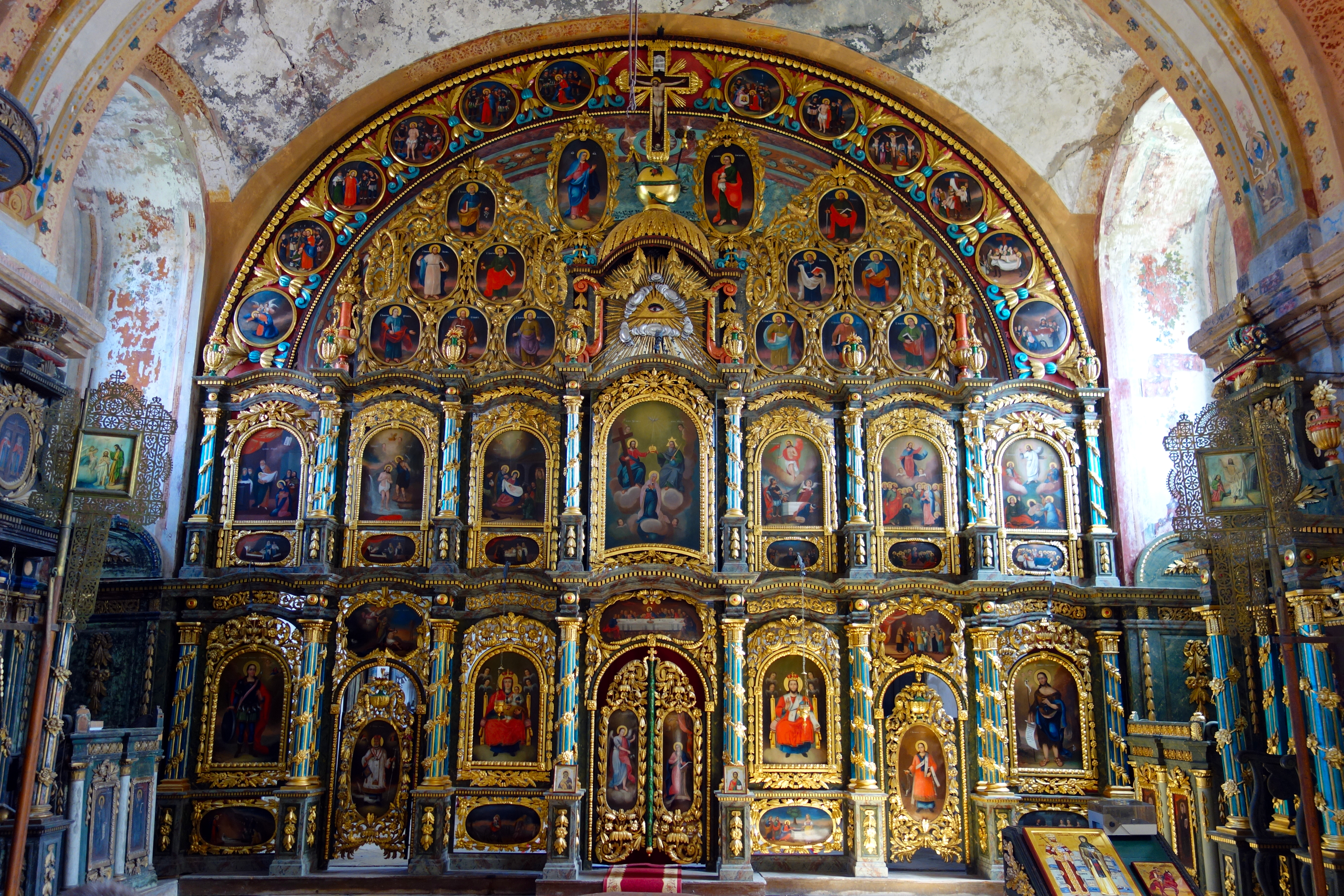
Iconostasis in Saint Demetrius Church, Siklós

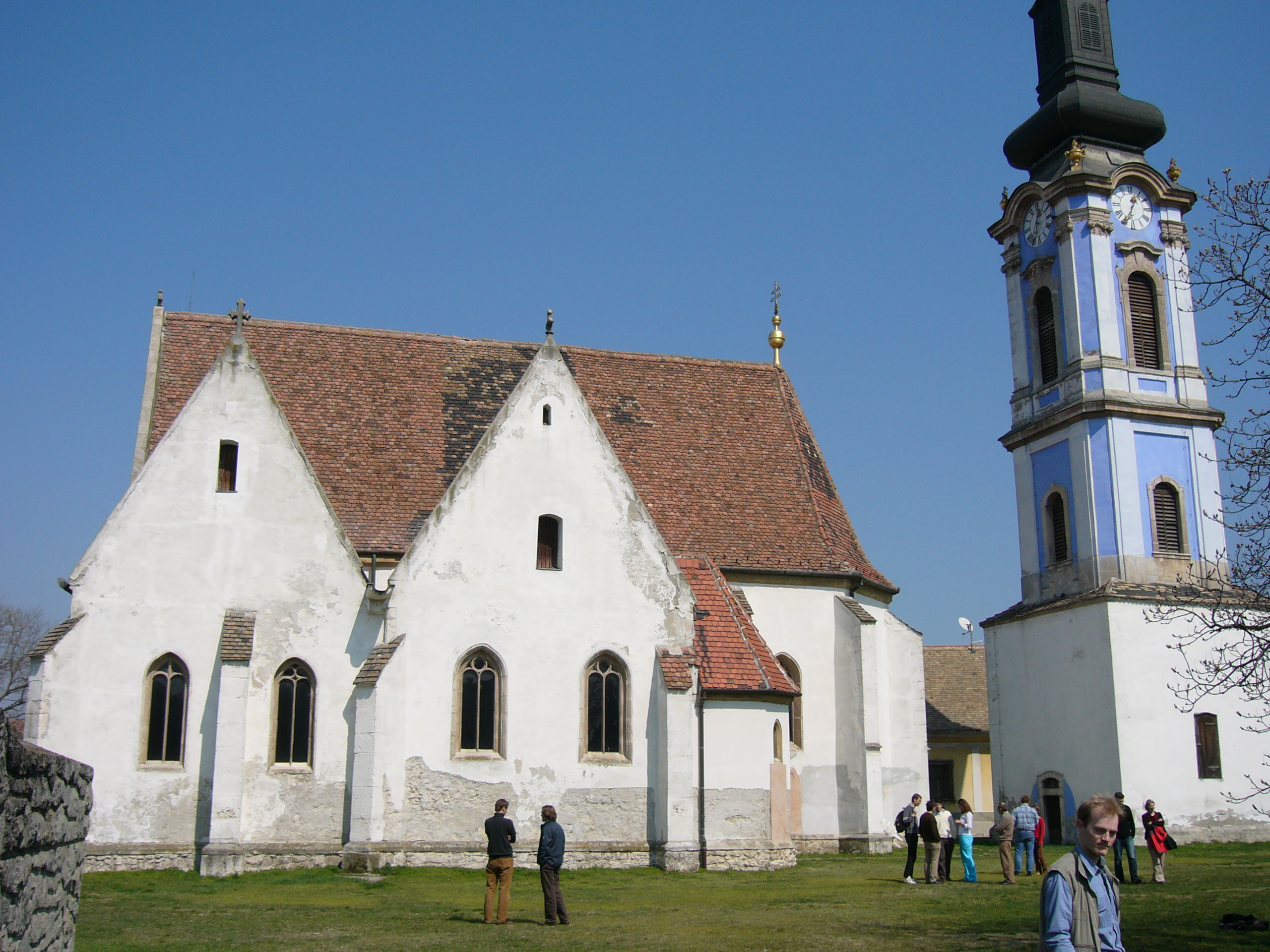
The Monastery of the Dormition of the Holy Mother of God in Ráckeve

St. Cyrill & Methodius Bulgarian Orthodox Church in Budapest

Between the middle of the 10th and the beginning of the 13th century, medieval Hungary had occasional political ties with the Byzantine Empire and Kievan Rus'. In the mid 10th century, the Patriarchate of Constantinople sent a mission, headed by bishop Hierotheos, to the Principality of Hungary. The first eparchy in Hungary, the Metropolitanate of Tourkia, was established in 952. Hierotheos was consecrated as bishop of Tourkia by the Patriarchate of Constantinople. The first known record of its metropolis status was in 1028 at a synod in Constantinople, when a hierarch named Ioannes is recorded as “Metropolitan of Tourkia”. Byzantine authors of this period referred to Hungarians as Tourkoi ("Turks") and to their land as Tourkia ("Turkey").

During medieval period, there was significant presence of Eastern Orthodoxy in some southern and eastern parts of medieval Kingdom of Hungary, including Romanian, Serbian and Ukrainian minorities.

In 1440, Hungarian king Ladislaus the Posthumous granted special privileges to Eastern Orthodox Christians for the establishment of the Serbian Kovin Monastery. In 1481 and 1495, during the times of Turkish invasions, Hungarian kings Matthias Corvinus and Vladislaus II have granted special privileges to Eastern Orthodox Christians in order to secure demographic recovery and improve the defenses of southern frontiers.

During the period of Ottoman rule (16th and 17th centuries), Eastern Orthodox Christians in Ottoman Hungary were under ecclesiastical jurisdiction of the Serbian Patriarchate of Peć, with several eparchies existing in the region. Since the liberation at the end of the 17th century, Eastern Orthodox Christians on the territory of Hungary were under jurisdiction of the Metropolitanate of Karlovci (since 1848 the Patriarchate of Karlovci), that was incorporated in 1920 into unified Serbian Orthodox Church. The Eparchy of Buda, created in the 16th century, remained in Hungary, with its seat in Szentendre, near Budapest.

Nowadays, besides the Serbian Orthodox Church, there are other jurisdictions of the Eastern Orthodox Church active in Hungary.

The Russian Orthodox Church has the Diocese of Budapest and Hungary headed by metropolitan Nestor Sirotenko whose see is in Budapest. The diocese has eleven parishes, with 14 priests and 3 deacons.

The Ecumenical Patriarchate of Constantinople also maintains a presence in Hungary. The Hungarian Exarchate is part of the Metropolis of Austria of the Ecumenical Patriarchate of Constantinople. They have seven parishes in the country.

The Romanian Orthodox Church has the Diocese of Gyula headed by Siluan Mănuilă, whose see is in Gyula.

The Bulgarian Orthodox Church has two parishes in Hungary, in Budapest and Pécs, with one priest. Both parishes are under the authority of the Bulgarian Orthodox Eparchy for Central and Western Europe.

== See also ==
- Religion in Hungary
- History of Christianity in Hungary
- Metropolitanate of Tourkia
- Union of Uzhhorod
- Metropolitanate of Karlovci
- Catholic Church in Hungary

== Literature ==
- Baán, István (1997). "The Foundation of the Archbishopric of Kalocsa: The Byzantine Origin of the Second Archdiocese in Hungary". Early Christianity in Central and East Europe. Warszawa: Semper. pp. 67–74. ISBN 9788386951338.
- Baán, István (1999). "The Metropolitanate of Tourkia: The Organization of the Byzantine Church in Hungary in the Middle Ages". Byzanz und Ostmitteleuropa 950-1453. Wiesbaden: Harrassowitz Verlag. pp. 45–53. ISBN 9783447041461.
- Berend, Nora; Urbańczyk, Przemysław; Wiszewski, Przemysław (2013). Central Europe in the High Middle Ages: Bohemia, Hungary and Poland, c. 900-c. 1300. New York: Cambridge University Press. ISBN 9780521781565.
- Ćirković, Sima (2004). The Serbs. Malden: Blackwell Publishing. ISBN 9781405142915.
- Curta, Florin (2006). Southeastern Europe in the Middle Ages, 500–1250. Cambridge: Cambridge University Press. ISBN 978-0-521-81539-0.
- Gavrilović, Slavko (1993). "Serbs in Hungary, Slavonia and Croatia in struggles against the Turks (15th–18th centuries)". Serbs in European Civilization. Belgrade: Nova, Serbian Academy of Sciences and Arts, Institute for Balkan Studies. pp. 41–54.
- Kiminas, Demetrius (2009). The Ecumenical Patriarchate: A History of Its Metropolitanates with Annotated Hierarch Catalogs. Wildside Press LLC. ISBN 9781434458766.
- Koszta, László (2014). "Byzantine Archiepiscopal Ecclesiastical System in Hungary?". The Carpathian Basin, the Hungarians and Byzantium. Szeged: Szegedi Tudományegyetem. pp. 127–143.
- Madgearu, Alexandru (2008). "The Mission of Hierotheos: Location and Significance". Byzantinoslavica. 66: 119–138.
- Madgearu, Alexandru (2017). "Further Considerations on Hierotheos' Mission to the Magyars". Acta Musei Napocensis. 54 (2): 1–16.
- Molnár, Antal (2019). "Szerb ortodox egyházszervezet a hódolt Magyarországon". Szerb székesegyház a Tabánban: Az eltűnt Rácváros emlékezete. Budapest: Budapesti Történeti Múzeum. pp. 33–63.
- Nesbitt, John; Oikonomides, Nicolas, eds. (1991). Catalogue of Byzantine Seals at Dumbarton Oaks and in the Fogg Museum of Art, Volume 1: Italy, North of the Balkans, North of the Black Sea. Vol. 1. Washington, DC: Dumbarton Oaks Research Library and Collection. ISBN 0-88402-194-7.
- Éva Révész, Régészeti és történeti adatok a kora árpád-kori bizánci-bolgár-magyar egyházi kapcsolatokhoz, Doktori értekezés, Szeged 2011.
- Sotirović, Vladislav B. (2011). "The Serbian Patriarchate of Peć in the Ottoman Empire: The First Phase (1557–94)" (PDF). Serbian Studies. 25 (2): 143–169. Archived from the original (PDF) on 2016-08-10.
- Stephenson, Paul (2000). Byzantium's Balkan Frontier: A Political Study of the Northern Balkans, 900-1204. Cambridge University Press. ISBN 9780521770170.
- Stojkovski, Boris (2016). "The Greek Charter of the Hungarian King Stephen I". Зборник радова Византолошког института. 53: 127–140.
- Točanac-Radović, Isidora (2022). "The Great Migration of Serbs and the Question of the Serbian Ethnic and Religious Community in the Habsburg Monarchy". Migrations in the Slavic Cultural Space: From the Middle Ages to the Present Day. Łódź: Łódź University Press. pp. 15–27.
- Véghseő, Tamás (2015). "Reflections on the Background to the Union of Uzhhorod / Ungvár (1646)" (PDF). Eastern Theological Journal. 1 (1): 147–181.
