= Serbian Kovin Monastery =

Serbian Orthodox monastery in Rackeve, Hungary

Coordinates: 47.1605°N 18.9430°E

The Monastery of the Dormition of the Holy Mother of God
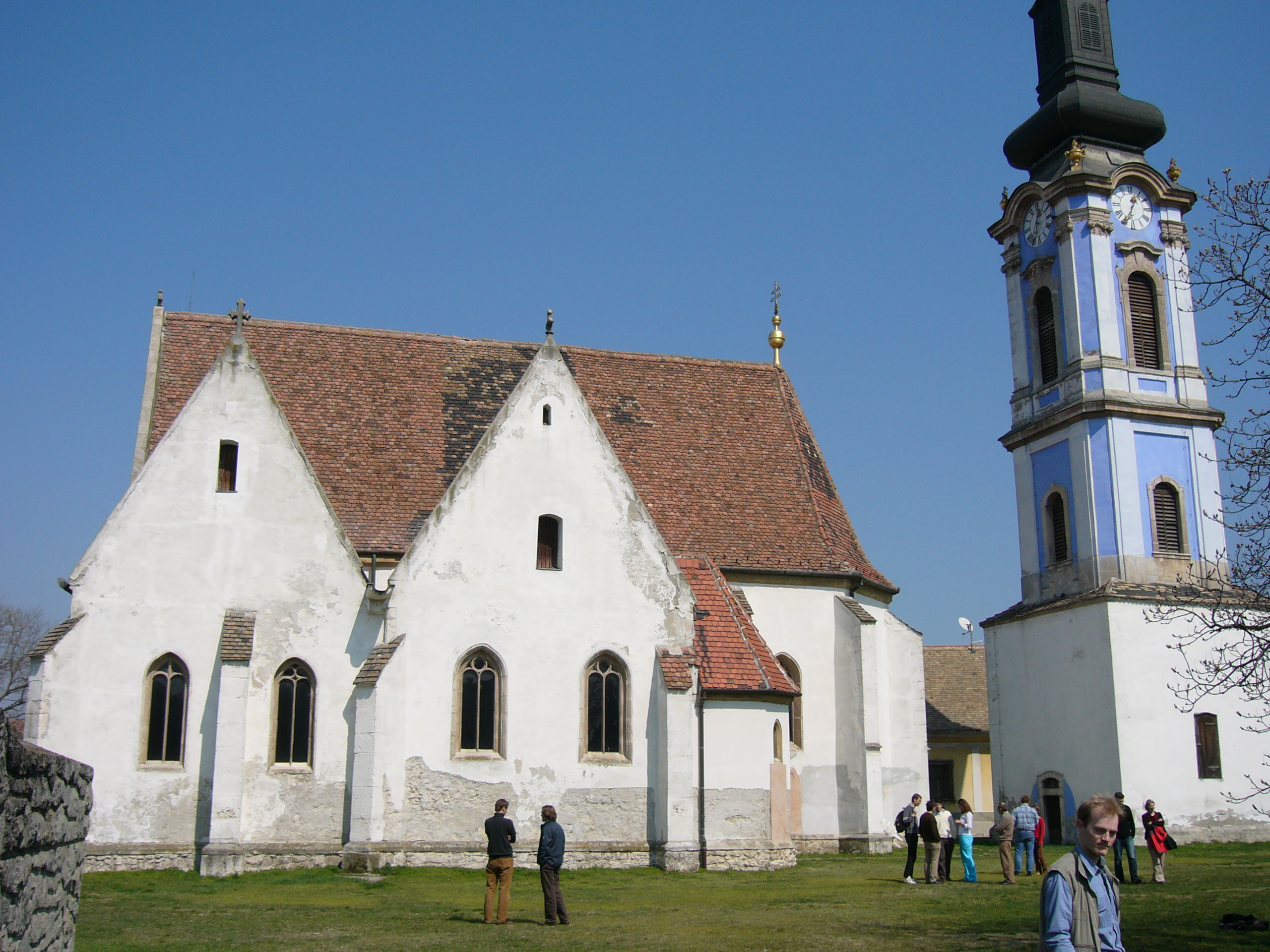
- Interactive map of The Monastery of the Dormition of the Holy Mother of God

Monastery information
- Full name: Serbian Kovin Monastery
- Order: Serbian Orthodox Church
- Established: 12th century
- Dedication: Dormition of the Theotokos
- Diocese: Eparchy of Buda

People
- Founder: Queen Helena

Site
- Location: Ráckeve, Hungary
- Public access: Yes

The Monastery of the Dormition of the Holy Mother of God, often called the Serbian Kovin monastery (Serbian: Манастир српски Ковин, romanized: Manastir srpski Kovin; Hungarian: Ráckevei Szerb Monostor) is an Eastern Orthodox Christian monastery located in Ráckeve, Hungary. It is under jurisdiction of the Eparchy of Buda of the Serbian Orthodox Church

The monastery is one of the oldest in Hungary and is situated 40 km south of Budapest, on the island of Csepel, in the center of the little town of Ráckeve (Serbian: Srpski Kovin).

== History ==
According to a preserved tradition, often neglected, this monastery has a medieval heritage and appeared in the first half of the 12th century. Queen Helena, the daughter of the Grand Prince of Serbia Uroš I, and the wife of Hungarian king Bela II the Blind is mentioned as the founder of the monastery. At the time when the monastery was founded Hungary was being ruled by Helena instead of her underage son, Geza II (1141–1161).

After the Turks had besieged and for the first time conquered Smederevo Fortress in 1439, they crossed the Danube on two occasions and devastated and robbed Kovin and all surrounding villages. Those who escaped moved to the inland of Hungary and reached to the island of Csepel on the Danube. On October 10, 1440, Hungarian king Vladislav gave to the Kovin migrants the Early Gothic style church with chapels and bell tower, and with it, presumably, the corresponding part of the royal landholdings. From that time on, there is on Csepel, Upper (Serbian: Gornji) or Serbian (Serbian: Srpski) Kovin, with the church dedicated to the Dormition of Mother of God with the chapels of the Nativity of St. John the Baptist and St. Unmercenary Physicians and Wonderworkers Cosmas and Damian (the first on the southeast, the second on the southwest side).

There is a possibility that in the years around the half of the 16th century the parish church was transformed into the monastery. There is no direct evidence for this conclusion, but in the Turkish census of 1546 three monks and a priest were recorded in Serbian Kovin, that indicates the possibility that, along with the church, the monastery was already there. The (so far) reliable data from 1680 confirms the existence of the monastery on the island of Csepel. As part of the reduction of the monasteries in the time of Maria Theresa, the Serbian Kovin monastery was abolished in 1777 and the small monastic brotherhood, probably led by Archimandrite Josif Stanojević, moved to the monastery of Grabovac and the Serbian Kovin church was turned into a parish. After more than two centuries, this great shrine of Serbs in Hungary again gained the status of the monastery, led by Abbot Andrej Pandurović.

== Architecture ==
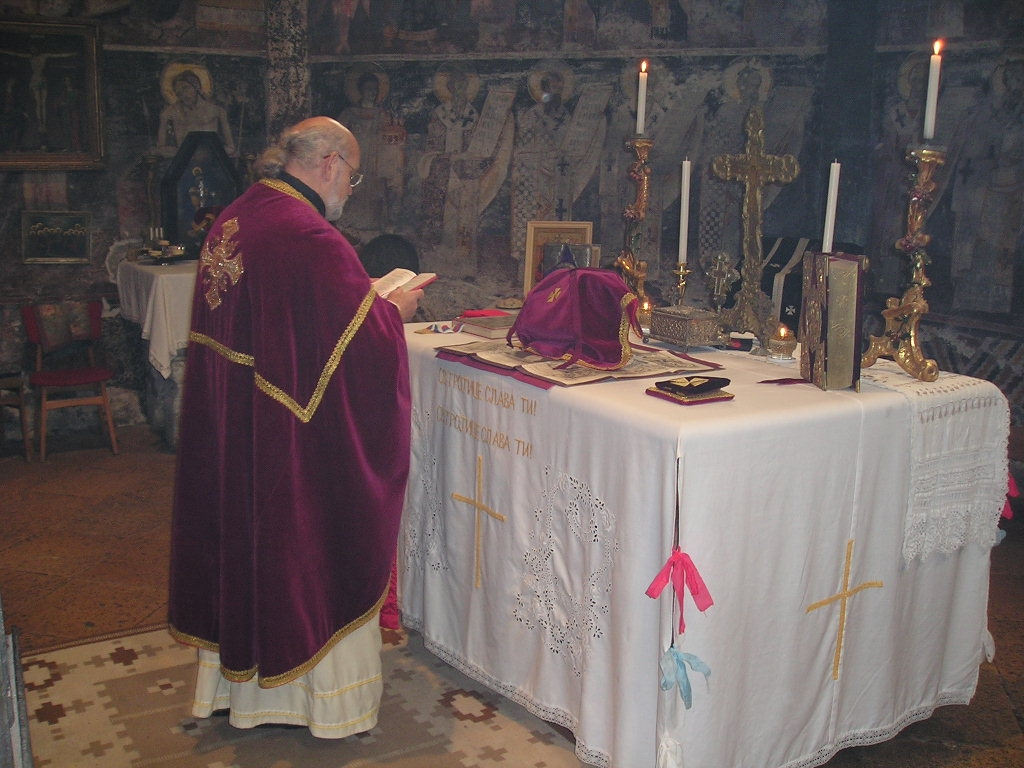
Abbot Andrej Pandurović

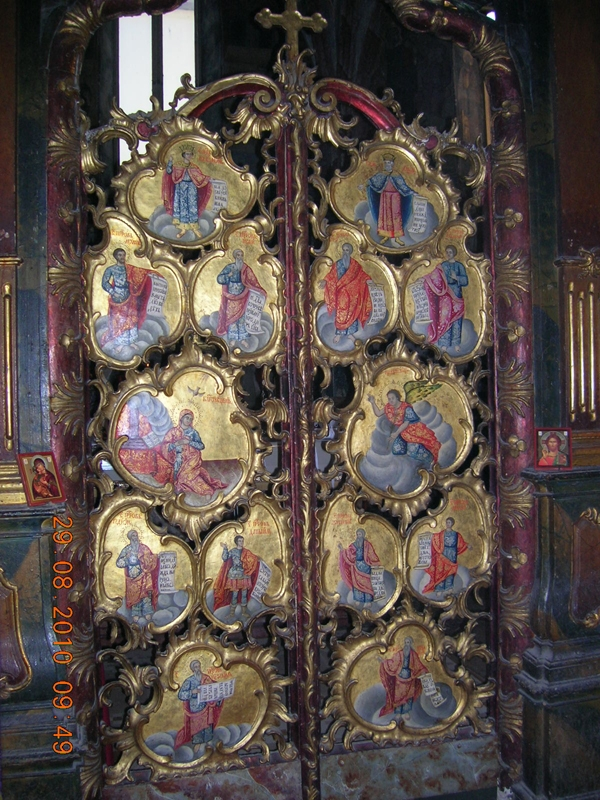
Royal door

Initially, at the end of the 13th century, the church was a larger one-nave Early Gothic style building of rectangular base shape, dimensions of about 10 x 25 meters and with a useful floor area of about 175 m2. In the massive hewn stone walls, about 90 cm thick, there were two portals, nine two-part windows and 16 supporting pillars. Approximately from the same period dates the isolated belfry on the east side, built of hewn stone, is now preserved in the ground and first floors. Its basic size ( 7,40 X 7,20 m ), the thickness of its walls about 2,50 m and a small usable area indicate the depth of its foundations to two meters and its height of about 50 meters with a narrow pyramidal cap on top.

In the time after the year of 1440, after the church had been given to the Serbs, the harmonious and proportionate Gothic building ( with the chapels ) was, with minor interventions, turned into the Orthodox oratory. The eastern aisle, trigonously completed, was renovated and converted into the altar area of appropriate size. Without a doubt, the original iconostasis in the obtained church was a low altar screen with a small number of icons brought from Kovin in Banat. Today's iconostasis with a smaller number of icons dates from 1770. Only four main icons were painted earlier, in 1746, and present the work of unknown Russian and Ukrainian masters. Other icons, including those in unusual places below the main ones, belong to the masters from Moshopolis. This "developed" altar screen has several horizontal zones. The first is a parapet one and unpainted. The second comprises the Royal Doors with 14 medallions of Prophets, side doors with icons above them and finally the main icons with the elongated medallions in the foot. In the final fourth zone there are the cross with the crucifixion, two associated icons and the icons of Apostles in the carved frames.

On the foundations of an earlier, probably collapsed tower, there was built the Baroque part of the bell tower in 1756 in two floor level with the high decorative cap on top. Together with the earlier levels the belfry has a ground floor, three floors and a cap of timber coated with copper sheeting. The height of the masonry part of the belfry is 26,10 m, the height of the decorative cap (with the apple and the cross is 14,30 m while the overall height is 40,40 meters. Observed in the context of the Serbian Baroque architecture, the belfry belongs to the group of rare towers completely separated from the church.

== Frescoes ==
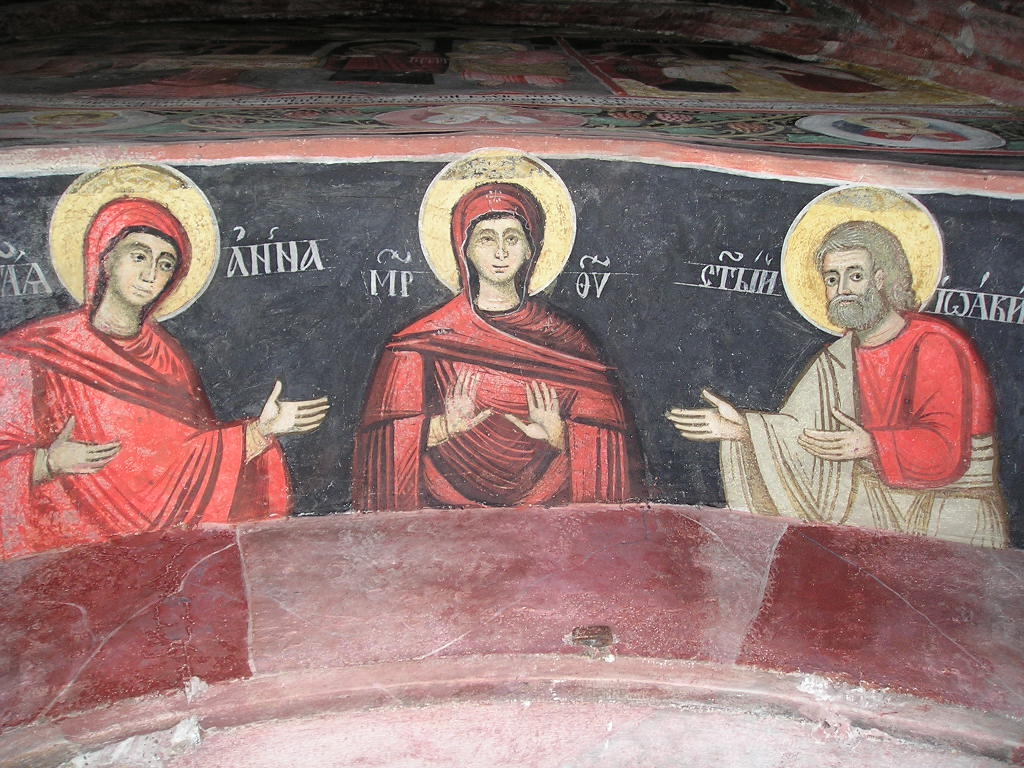
Virgin Mary and her parents

The inscription on a bronze plate embedded into the southern wall of the narthex says that the church was painted three times – in 1320 ( of which there are no surviving traces ), then in 1514 ( as for those paintings one can see only a fragment of the image of Virgin Mary with Christ under the parts of plaster from 1765 that fell off ) and the last time in 1765. The inscription above the southern door leading from the church into the chapel of St. John the Baptist, also tells about wall painting of the church on three occasions. In the side chapels the wall paintings were made in 1771, as can be read in the inscription.

The wall paintings in the Church of the Dormition of Mother of God and its two chapels in Serbian Kovin were painted by artists led by Teodor Simeonov from Moshopolis. The contracts that the master signed with the purchasers of the paintings are also preserved. Since the church is done in the Gothic style, the iconographer faced a difficult task to develop the scenes in the manner of the old Byzantine and Serbian church painting placing them in the Gothic divided sections of the walls. The whole main church as well as the chapels, from the ground up to the top of the Gothic vaults, among the intertwined pillars, according to the proportion of space that up in the arches gets narrower, are symmetrically filled with frescoes of saints and Serbian rulers and saints. The joints of the columns are nicely combined and covered with smaller images of the Evangelists, Apostles, Martyrs, Angels and Archangels. In the lower parts of the walls, between the vertical columns, the Serbian rulers, from Nemanja to Emperor Uroš and Prince Lazar, are aligned in their actual size.

The fresco in the south wall, in the doorpost of the passage between the chapel of St. John the Baptist and the main church, painted in 1765, in which Joachim and Anna prayerfully address the Virgin, is an interesting and remarkable phenomenon in Serbian painting. The scene resembles the composition of Deisis, but the Virgin and her parents appear as protagonists.

== See also ==
- List of Serbian Orthodox monasteries
- Eparchy of Buda
- Serbs of Hungary
