= Szigetcsép =

- Coat of arms

- Location of Szigetcsép in Hungary
- Coordinates: 47.26507°N 18.96828°E
- Country: Hungary
- Region: Central Hungary
- County: Pest
- Subregion: Ráckevei
- Rank: Village

Area
  - Total: 18.20 km^{2} (7.03 sq mi)

Population (1 January 2008)
  - Total: 2,358
  - Density: 129.6/km^{2} (335.6/sq mi)
- Time zone: UTC+1 (CET)
  - Summer (DST): UTC+2 (CEST)
- Postal code: 2317
- Area code: +36 24
- KSH code: 07870
- Website: https://szigetcsep.hu/

Szigetcsép is a village in Pest county, Hungary. The Csepel Island has two villages, Lórév (Lovra) and Szigetscép (Čip), and the town of Ráckeve which is inhabited by Serbs as well as Hungarians and Germans. In this Hungarian village, approximately one hundred Serbs are living with Hungarians and Germans. The majority of the old Serbian population moved from Szigetcsép to Serbia in 1924 to settle in the village of Bački Brestovac.
