= Niedervellmar =

Human settlement in Germany

Coordinates: 51°21′14″N 9°28′21″E

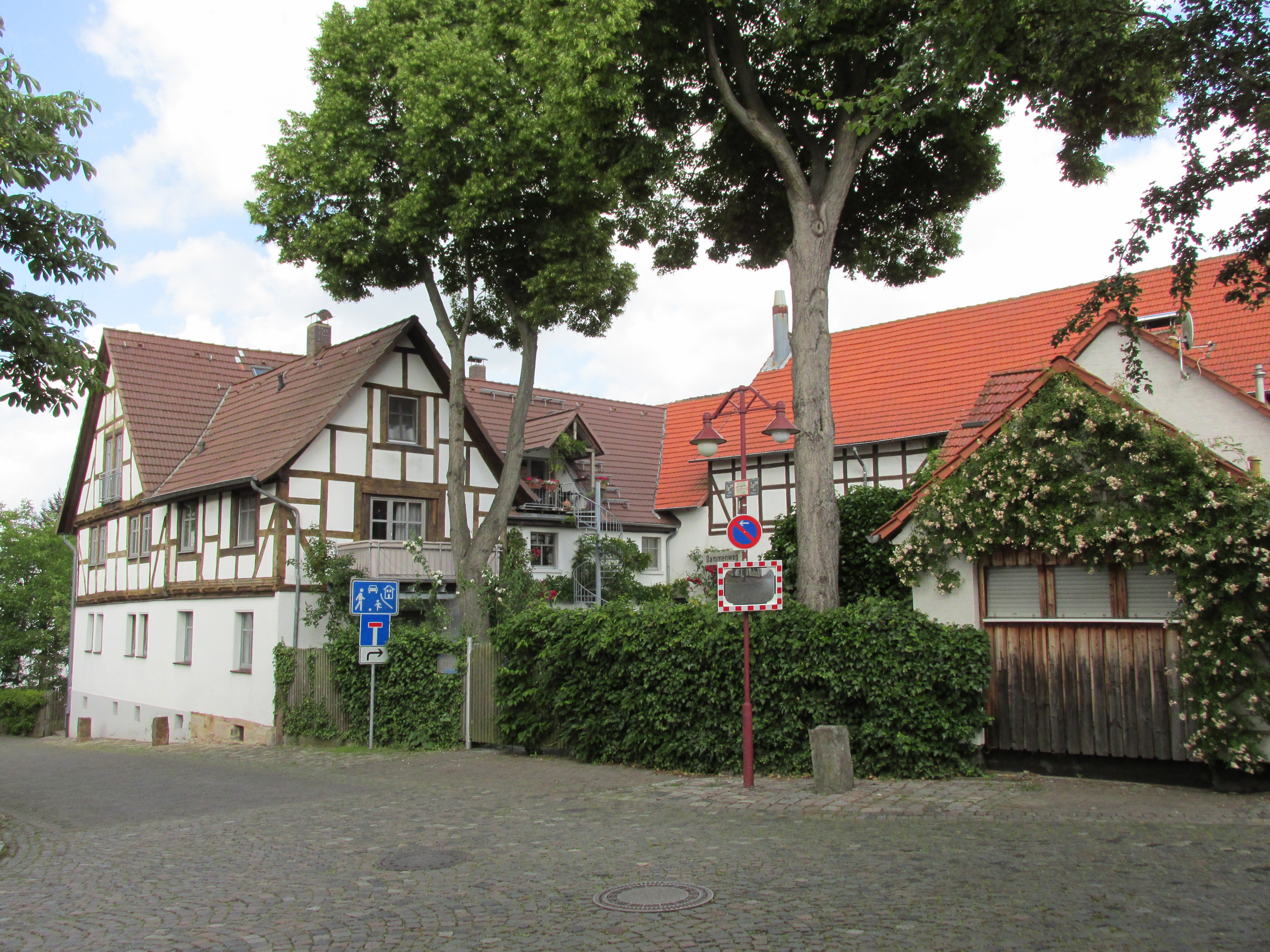
A street in Niedervellmar.

Niedervellmar is a district of Vellmar, a town in Hesse in Germany.
