= Vellmar =

- Town
- Coat of arms

- Location of Vellmar within Kassel district
- Interactive map of Vellmar
- Location within Germany Location within Hesse
- Coordinates: 51°21′N 09°28′E
- Country: Germany
- State: Hesse
- Admin. region: Kassel
- District: Kassel

Government
  - Mayor (2020–26): Manfred Ludewig (SPD)

Area
  - Total: 13.97 km^{2} (5.39 sq mi)
- Elevation: 163–361 m (535–1,184 ft)

Population (2025-12-31)
  - Total: 17,751
  - Density: 1,271/km^{2} (3,291/sq mi)
- Time zone: UTC+01:00 (CET)
  - Summer (DST): UTC+02:00 (CEST)
- Postal codes: 34246
- Dialling codes: 0561
- Vehicle registration: KS
- Website: www.vellmar.de

Vellmar (German pronunciation: [ˈfɛlmaʁ]) is a town in the Kassel district, in Hesse, Germany. It is located on the Ahne river.

== History ==
Vellmar gained city rights on August 30, 1975, to mark its 1200th anniversary, becoming, together with Baunatal, the youngest city in the district of Kassel. Between 1975 and the mid-1980s, the centre of the city with the town hall, shops and medical-centre, and the residential area of Musikerviertel, was built. The river Ahne that runs through the city is the namesake for the Ahnepark local recreation area, built in 1986.

Vellmar consists of four districts: Obervellmar, Niedervellmar, Frommershausen and Vellmar-West.

== Transportation ==
The traffic infrastructure of Vellmar consists of three railway stations – Obervellmar, Niedervellmar and Osterberg/EKZ - and the B 7 road. There is a tram into the city of Kassel.

== International relations ==
Vellmar is twinned with:

- Zell am See (Austria)
- Bewdley (United Kingdom)
- Szigetszentmárton (Hungary)
