= Deszk =

Deszk _{Деска}
- Village
- Coat of arms

- Location within Hungary
- Coordinates: 46°13′N 20°15′E
- Country: Hungary
- County: Csongrád

Area
  - Total: 52.05 km^{2} (20.10 sq mi)

Population (2018)
  - Total: 4,048
  - Density: 62/km^{2} (160/sq mi)
- Time zone: UTC+1 (CET)
  - Summer (DST): UTC+2 (CEST)
- Postal code: 6772
- Area code: 62

Deszk [ˈdɛsk] (Serbian: Деска or Deska) is a village in Csongrád-Csanád County, Hungary, located near the city of Szeged. Deszk has a historically important Serb minority that comprised 4.9% of the population in 2001. The name of the village was first mentioned in 1490.

== Climate ==
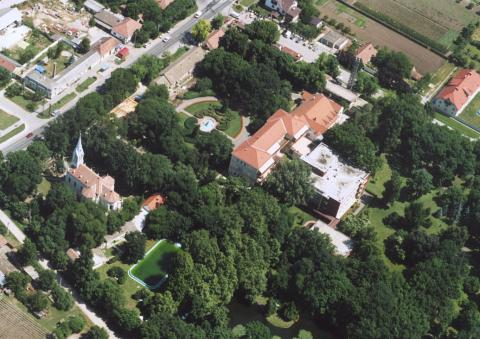
Aerial view

Climate in this area has mild differences between highs and lows, and there is adequate rainfall year-round. The Köppen Climate Classification subtype for this climate is "Cfb" (Marine West Coast Climate/Oceanic climate).

== Twin towns – sister cities ==
Deszk is twinned with:

- Dealu, Romania
- Dumbrava, Romania
- Königstein (Sächsische Schweiz), Germany
- Novi Kneževac, Serbia
- Pollare (Ninove), Belgium
- Rakhiv, Ukraine
- Uhersko, Czech Republic
