= Csobánka =

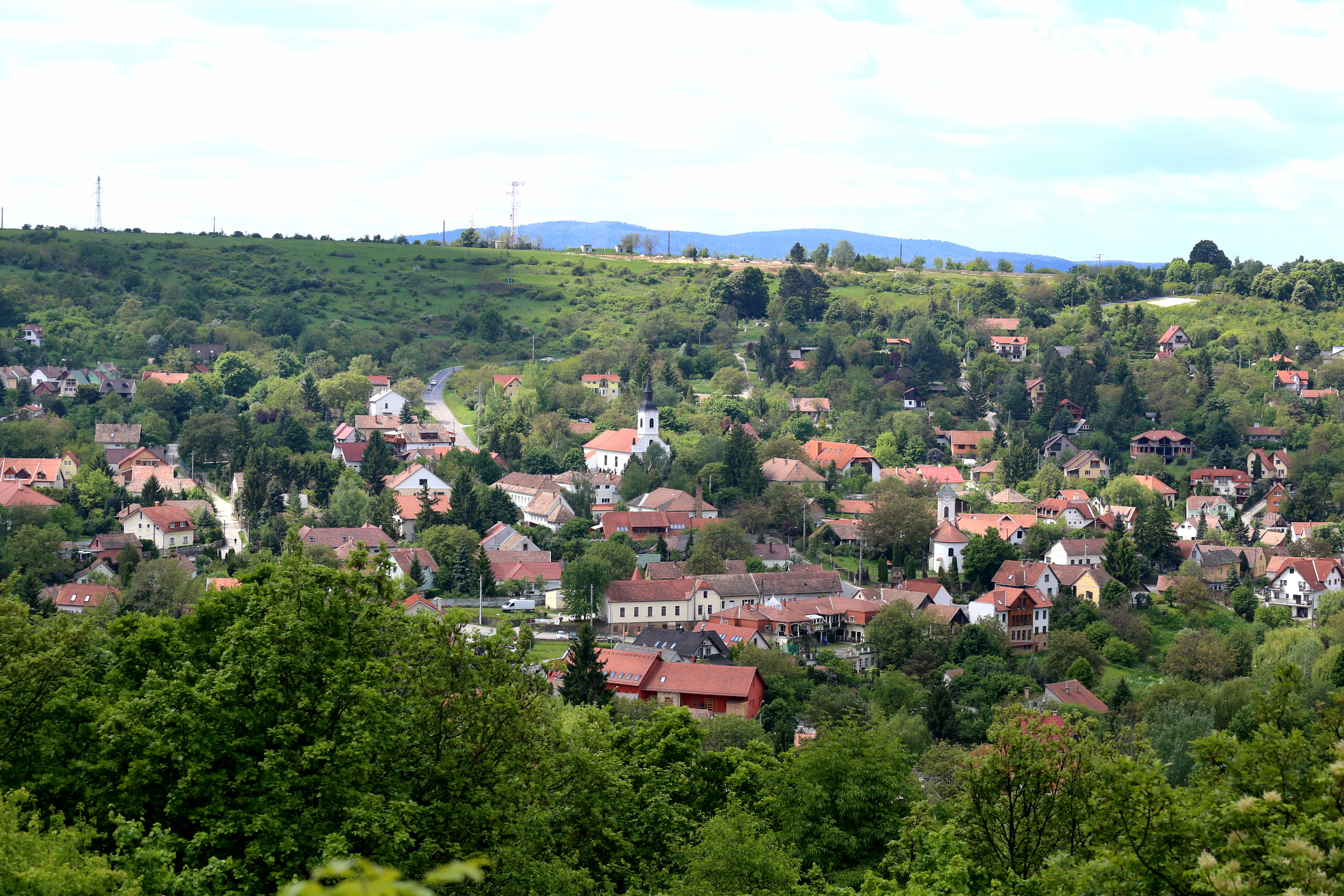
- Csobánka

- Coat of arms

- Location within Hungary
- Coordinates: 47°38′32.89″N 18°58′4.12″E
- Country: Hungary
- County: Pest

Area
  - Total: 22.76 km^{2} (8.79 sq mi)

Population (2011)
  - Total: 3,175
  - Density: 122/km^{2} (320/sq mi)
- Time zone: UTC+1 (CET)
  - Summer (DST): UTC+2 (CEST)
- Postal code: 2014
- Area code: 26

Csobánka is a village in Pest County, Budapest metropolitan area, Hungary. Csobánka is located in the Pilis Mountains which is a National Park in Hungary.

The name Csobánka comes from Ottoman Turkish چوبان (çoban) rooted in < Persian چوبان (čubân). which means shepherd. The word csobán originated from the settlement of the Magyars in Hungary. The earliest record of the official name was mentioned in a tax minute-book on January 3, 1698.

== Twin towns – sister cities ==
Csobánka is twinned with:

- Wertheim, Germany (1992)
