= Szigetszentmárton =

- Coat of arms

- Location of Szigetszentmárton in Hungary
- Coordinates: 47°13′36.77″N 18°57′26.71″E
- Country: Hungary
- Region: Central Hungary
- County: Pest
- Subregion: Ráckevei
- Rank: Village

Area
  - Total: 10.73 km^{2} (4.14 sq mi)

Population (1 January 2008)
  - Total: 2,080
  - Density: 194/km^{2} (502/sq mi)
- Time zone: UTC+1 (CET)
  - Summer (DST): UTC+2 (CEST)
- Postal code: 2318
- Area code: +36 24
- KSH code: 15185
- Website: http://www.szigetszentmarton.hu

Szigetszentmárton (German: Sankt Martin, Bulgarian: Сигесентмартон) is a picturesque, colorful - almost 750-year-old - small settlement in the heart of Csepel Island, Pest County Hungary.

== Civil organizations and churches ==
- Ganz Fishing Association
- Catholic Church
- Reformed Church
- German National Music Association
- Choir
- Dance group
- Monarchy Music Arts Association
- Swabian Tradition Preservation Association
- Village Sports Association
- St. Márton Youth and Water Sports Association
- Szigetszentmárton Lovasudvar Sports Association
- Kinizsi Fishing Association
- Volunteer Firefighters Association

== Twin towns ==
Szigetszentmárton terminated all of its twinnings.

- Oelde, Germany
- Vellmar, Germany
- Balchik, Bulgaria
- Pavlikeni, Bulgaria

== History ==
Szigetszentmárton belongs to the ancient settlements. The fact that people have lived here for thousands of years is also proven by the village's 4,000-year-old, world-famous archeological "ancient car" find, which is currently in the National Museum are guarded. In the name of the settlement, the name Szent Márton refers to the patron saint of the church. Szigetszentmárton's name appeared in writing for the first time in 1285, when IV.(Kun) László one of the charters of king was dated from here. Deák Lázár 's map made in 1528 also marks the village of Szent Márton. In the Middle Ages, the village also had the status of a market town. After the occupation of Buda, according to the Turkish censuses, a populated settlement with 43 tax-paying family names is listed with 26 houses. During the liberation war launched to recapture Buda, the dwindling population of the village dispersed. After the expulsion of the Turks, the victorious general Jenő Savoyai received the entire Csepel Island as a reward. When the fighting ended, only a few families returned, so Jenő of Savoy the lord Swabian settled settlers in the area of the village, later Mária Terézia settled Bavarian settlers. The great Danube flood of 1838 is 1886. A fire in 2006, which destroyed two-thirds of the village, changed the character of the settlement, the streets and inner plots became more orderly. The public school was founded in 1855 (the church's had been operating since 1742), in 1888 a kindergarten was organized. In the settlement since 1898 Voluntary Fire Brigade Association, since 1909 Farmers' Circle, From 1936, the Civil Shooting Society operated, then in 1939 the Hungarian The local organization of the Association of Germans, and in 1952, also the brass band. The German-speaking population of the village tried to promote its economic growth with diligent work. At the time of the census held in 1941, there were 1,069 people living in Szigetszentmárton. According to their mother tongue, 226 people considered themselves Hungarian, and 843 considered themselves German. The resettlement following World War II was carried out on the basis of this census. Hungarians from the Great Plains and Slovakia replaced those taken in the wagons.

Before the system change Szigetcsép, Szigetújfalu, Szigetszentmárton formed a common administrative unit. This was eliminated with the system change.

The number of inhabitants on 1 January 2010 was 2199.

The expedient implementation of the investments made it possible that today the settlement has 100% piped drinking water supply. 80% of the apartments have wired gas, 70% have a wired telephone. 85% of the road surface is dust-free. Construction of the sewer network is a priority.

The development of the infrastructure also kept pace with the development of the settlement. Shops, accommodation, restaurants were opened and the cultural center was also renewed.
