= Csepel Island =

Island in the Danube in Hungary

Coordinates: 47°15′N 18°57′E

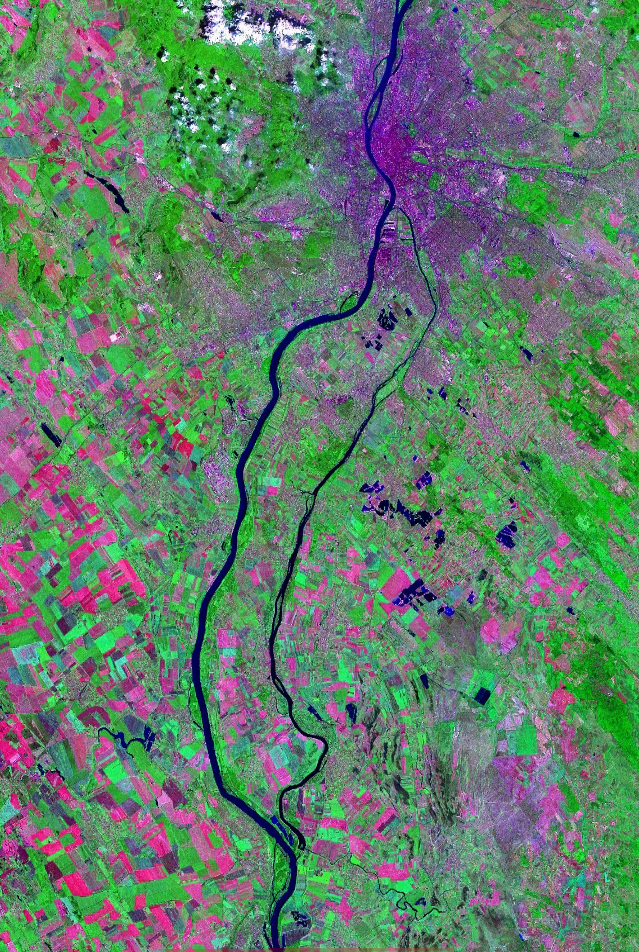
Satellite picture of Csepel Island

Csepel Island (Hungarian: Csepel-sziget, Hungarian pronunciation: [ˈtʃɛpɛl]) is an island in the Danube in Hungary. It is 48 km (30 mi) long, with a width generally ranging from 5 to 8 km (3 to 5 mi). It has an area of 257 km^{2} (99 sq mi) and its population is 165,000. The island extends south from Budapest, and its northern section forms the city's District XXI. Most of the island is accessible from Budapest by HÉV suburban railway, and the northern part belongs to the metropolitan area of the capital. Towns include Ráckeve, Szigetszentmiklós, Szigethalom, Halásztelek and Tököl. The central and southern sections retained their rural character.

== History ==
=== Early History ===
The island remained inhabited during the Early Iron Age, although archaeological evidence from this period remains scarce. At Szigetszentmárton, a cremation burial dated to the 6th century BC was discovered. The finds suggests that Csepel Island formed part of a transitional zone where cultural influences from the Hallstatt–Kalenderberg tradition of Transdanubia and the Scythian-related communities of the Great Hungarian Plain met and interacted.

During the Late Iron Age, the area was inhabited by Celtic peoples. Near the northern tip of the island, on the site of today’s Budapest Central Wastewater Treatment Facility, archaeologists uncovered a cemetery used from the second half of the 4th century BC to the late 3rd century BC. With 87 burials, including both inhumations and cremations, it is one of the most significant Celtic sites in the Pannonian Basin. Later Celtic presence is indicated by a rural waterside settlement excavated at Szigetszentmiklós-Üdülősor. Located beside the Soroksári-Duna, a side branch of the Danube, the settlement existed from the second half of the 1st century BC to the first half of the 1st century AD. The northern section of the island may have been part of the tribal territory of the Eravisci in the late La Tène period.

In the Roman period, Csepel Island occupied a transitional position along the Danube frontier. Although geographically located on the eastern edge of Pannonia, neither archaeological evidence nor written sources suggest that it formed an integrated part of the province. Roman-period finds on the island—primarily pottery, brooches (fibulae), and coins—occur sporadically and are concentrated mainly along the riverbanks, without forming any discernible settlement pattern. In contrast, the opposite bank of the Danube was lined with a chain of limes fortifications, including Campona, Matrica, and Vetus Salina, which played a key role in controlling river crossings. Based on the available evidence, the island was probably a sparsely used border zone where contacts took place between the Roman world and the populations living east of the river, including the Sarmatian Iazyges.

During the Hungarian conquest of the Carpathian Basin (Hungarian: honfoglalás: "conquest of the homeland"), Csepel Island became the early homestead of Árpád's tribe. The island is named after Árpád's horse groom, Csepel.

It features Hungary's tallest structure, Lakihegy Tower, a 314-metre (1,030 ft) radio mast used today intermittently for power network control purposes.
