= Ráckeve =

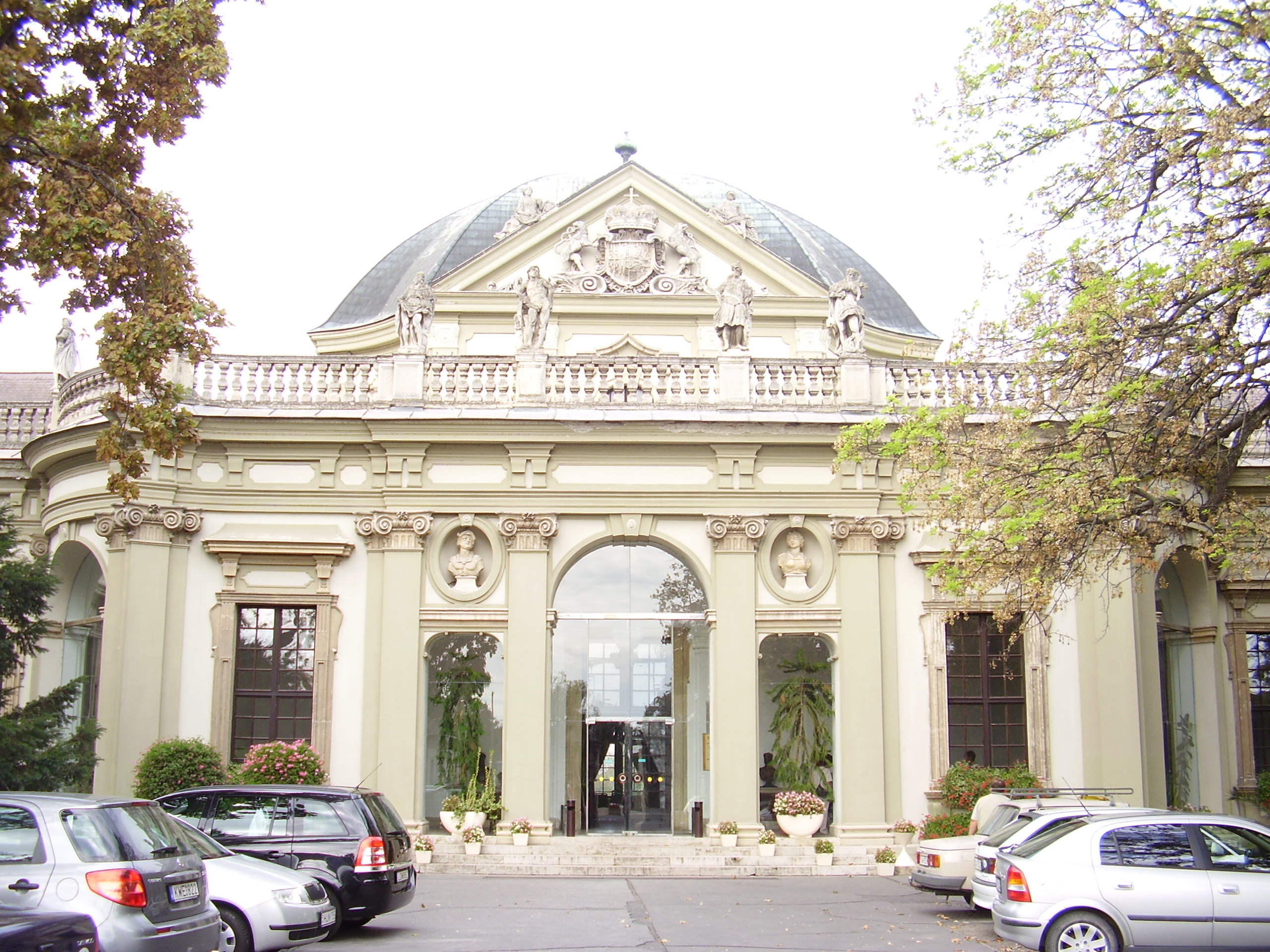
- Savoy Castle

- Flag Coat of arms

- Location of Ráckeve in Hungary
- Coordinates: 47.13116°N 18.94747°E
- Country: Hungary
- Region: Central Hungary
- County: Pest
- Subregion: Ráckevei
- Rank: City

Area
  - Total: 64.09 km^{2} (24.75 sq mi)

Population (2008)
  - Total: 9,726
  - Density: 151.8/km^{2} (393.0/sq mi)
- Time zone: UTC+1 (CET)
  - Summer (DST): UTC+2 (CEST)
- Postal code: 2300
- Area code: +36 24
- KSH code: 17260
- Website: http://www.rackeve.hu

Ráckeve (Serbian: Српски Ковин, Srpski Kovin) is a town on Csepel Island in the county of Pest County, Hungary. Its residents are mainly Magyars, with a minority of Serbs.

The Serbian Kovin Monastery, the oldest in Hungary and one of two in the Diocese of Buda of the Serbian Orthodox Church was built in 1487 in the center of Ráckeve. Also located in the center of the town is the Savoy Castle of Prince Eugene of Savoy, which was built in the baroque style between the years 1701 and 1702 by Johann Lukas von Hildebrandt.

== History ==
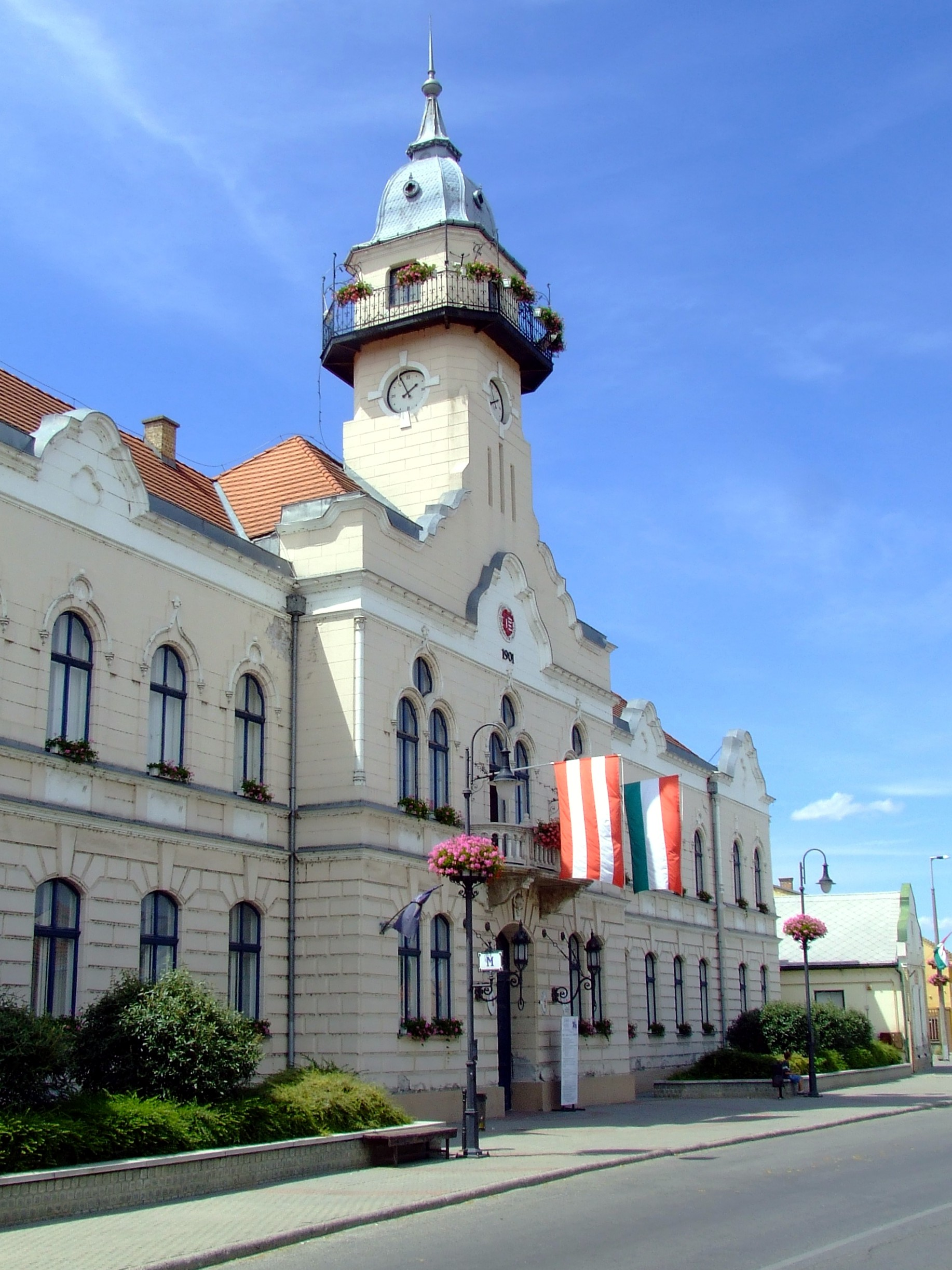
The town hall of Ráckeve

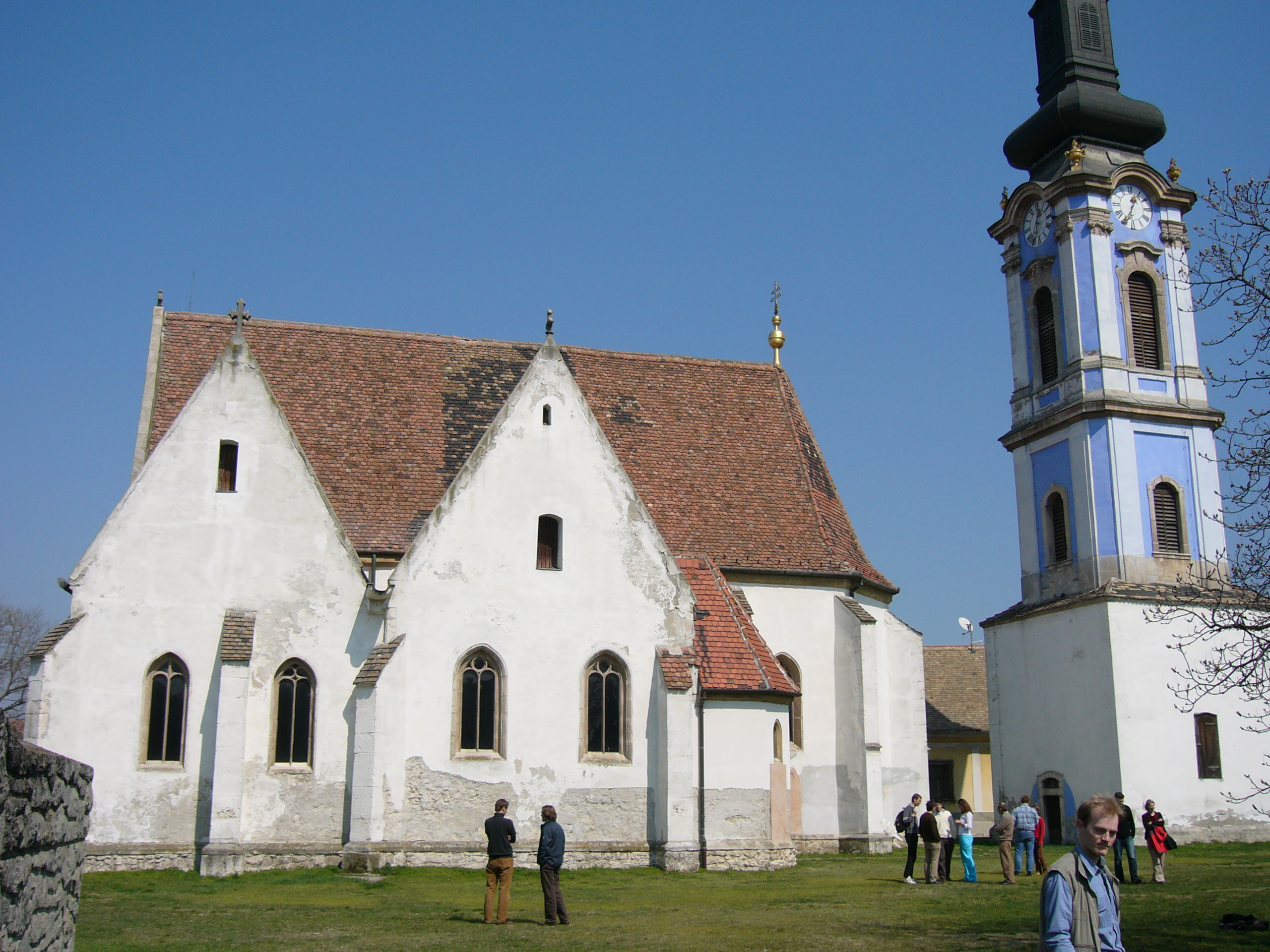
Serbian Orthodox Church From Year 1487.

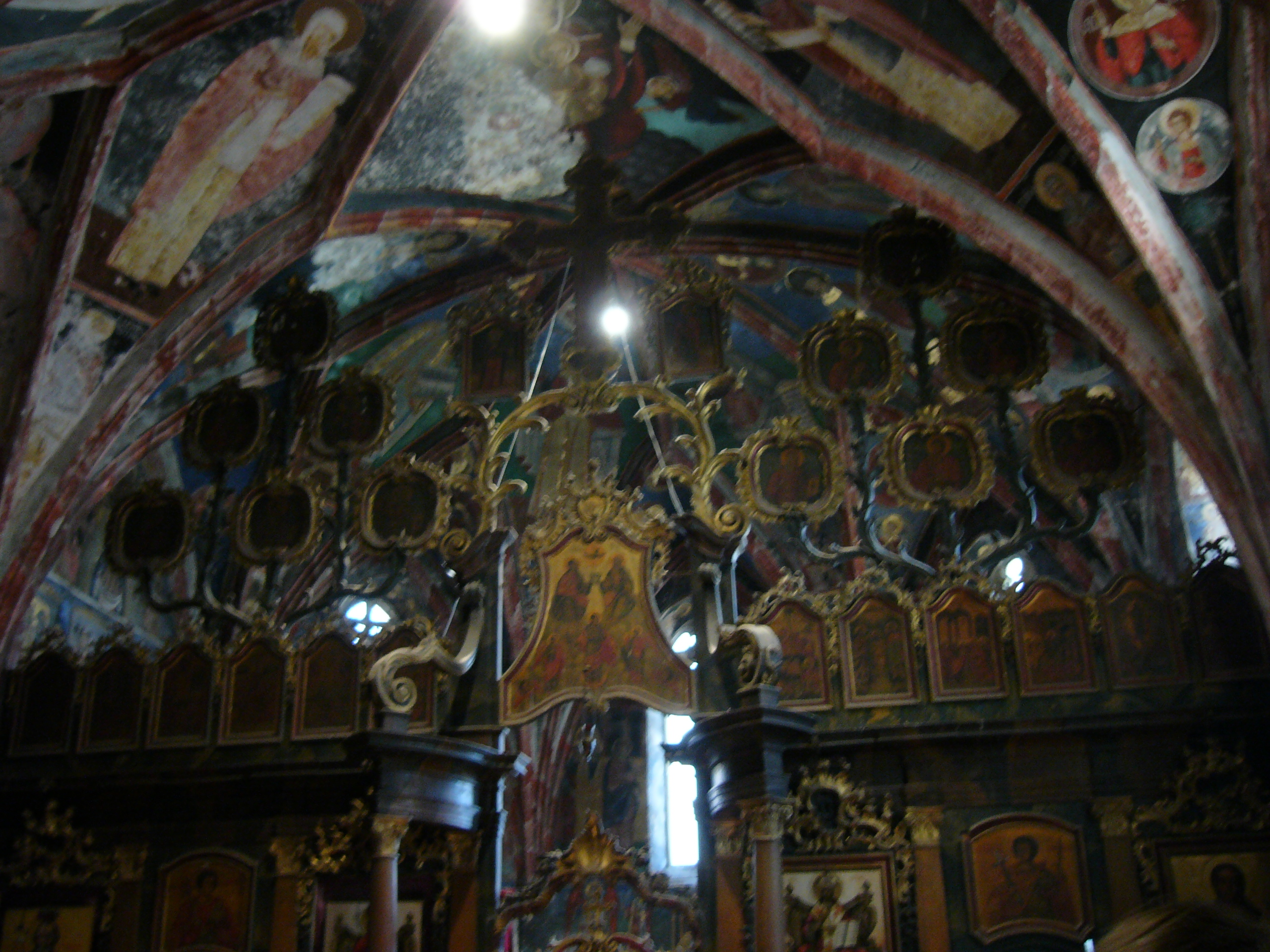
Serb Orthodox Church Paintings

After the Árpád dynasty was established, the region of today's Ráckeve belonged to the Hungarian king.

In the Middle Ages, there was a settlement here called Ábrahámtelke, and also a monastery built in the 12th century, mentioned in an official document in 1212 for the first time.

In the 15th century, many Serb refugees came from the South, fleeing the invasions of the Ottoman Turks. At this time, the settlement was called Kiskeue, that is to say "Kiskeve" in modern Hungarian. Kiskeve means "Little Keve" in English, and the Serbs in the town called it Mali Kovin = "Lesser Kovin", or Gornji Kovin ("Upper Kovin") in contrast with the name of other Kovin (Donji Kovin / "Lower Kovin") in the South, where the Serbs had fled from.

In the 16th century, Ráckeve was a respectable mercantile town. The Calvinist variant of Protestantism was spread in the town by István Szegedi Kis.

In 1541, the town fell under Ottoman rule, and most of its population fled towards the North. Many Serbs who used to live in the town settled in Győr and Komárom. Those who stayed in the town elected a "duke" called Đurđe (1543–46). In 1567, the town was populated by (mostly Calvinist) Hungarians and Serbs.

In 1698, after the expulsion of the Turkish, the whole of Csepel Island (Csepel-sziget), and thus Ráckeve too, became the land of the victorious Prince Eugene of Savoy. The new landlord had his mansion built in this settlement; it can be visited by prior appointment.

In the 18th century, the arrival of German settlers increased the number of inhabitants in the town. Thus the settlement became a tri-ethnic location with Hungarians, Serbs, and Germans. Their descendants still refer to the place as Srpski Kovin or Ratzenmarkt.

The end of the 19th century, the Millennium period represented a great upswing in the life of the town. At that time, the original wooden bridge was replaced by a permanent iron bridge and the decision was taken to build a new town hall, which was later erected in the Secession style on the site of the original.

A renowned angling paradise, Angelic Island divides the Danube branch here. The holiday resort areas were developed in the 1970s, at the same time the hot water spa and lido were also established. City status was granted again to Ráckeve in 1984.

== Name ==
The name of Ráckeve in today's form derives from the Hungarian words rác and keve.

Rác is a name formerly used in Hungarian to designate Serbs, who lived, among other regions, in the medieval Serbian region of Raška (Latin: Rascia), that became the second designation for medieval Serbia, since the end of the 12th century.

Keve means cemetery in medieval Hungarian. In pre-modern Hungarian it also meant little stone, or pebble, that was put on tombs. There is also a theory that the word keve is of Hunnic origin and it was the name of one of the leaders of Attila in the 4th century. Since the 19th century, the name Keve has been used as a personal name among Hungarians, due to the traditional theories among Hungarians on Hun-Hungarian historical relations.

The Serbs named the place after the town of Kovin in Banat (Vojvodina in Serbia) whence most inhabitants had fled to settle in Ráckeve. In Serbian, Ráckeve is known as Горњи Ковин / Gornji Kovin ("Upper Kovin"), Мали Ковин / Mali Kovin ("Lesser Kovin"), or Srpski Kovin / Српски Ковин ("Serbian Kovin"). This is to contrast it in Serbian with the name of the original town in Vojvodina, known as just Kovin in Serbian and Keve in Hungarian.

The Serbian word Kovin comes from the root "ков-" / "kov-" = "smith" (cf. ковач / kovač = ironsmith; ковница / kovnica = "copper mint" кованица / kovanica = "coin" потковица / potkovica = "horseshoe" etc.)

== Sights ==
Ráckeve is famous for the only Gothic style Serb Orthodox Church in Hungary, from the 15th century.

The Catholic church was designed by Patay László. The Fresco-secco in the church is worth seeing.

The Calvinist church was built in a neo-gothic style in 1913.

There is also an Árpád Museum.

There is Hungary's only authentic old Ship mill. It was built from donations exclusively, and operated by "Ráckevei Molnár Céh" (Ráckeve Miller Guild). This is the most visited attraction in the city.

=== Savoy Castle ===
The Savoy Castle of Prince Eugene of Savoy in central Ráckeve was built in the baroque style in 1702–1750.

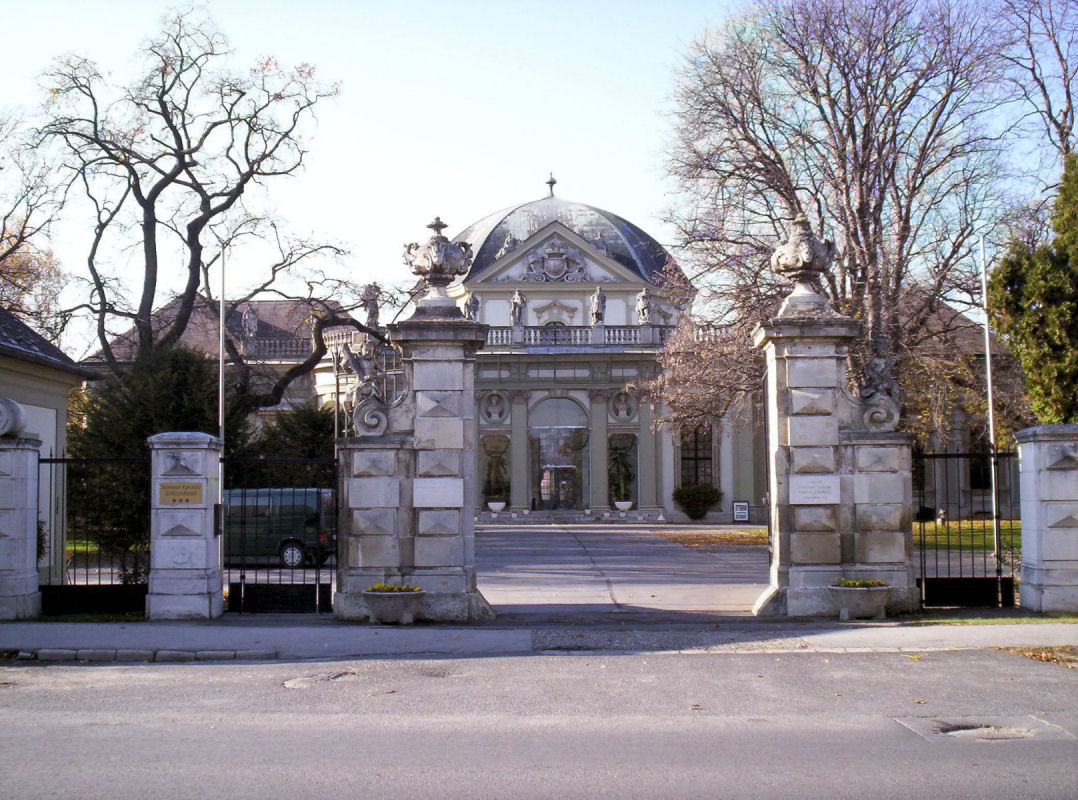

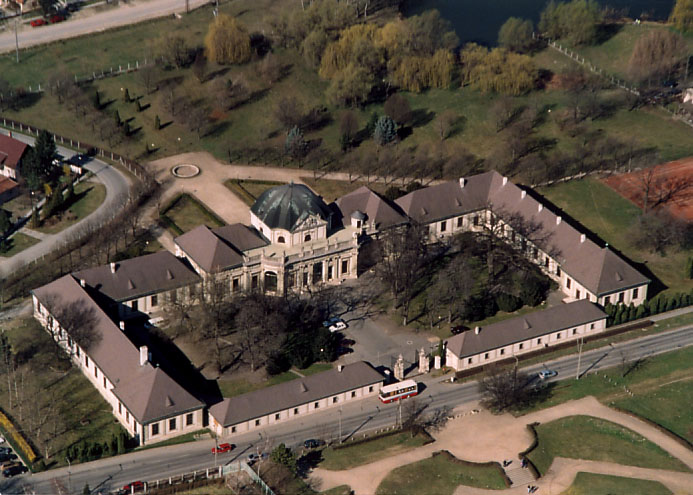

== Twin towns – sister cities ==
Ráckeve is twinned with:

- Baktalórántháza, Hungary
- Calden, Germany
- Ciumani, Romania
- Dány, Hungary
- Kovin, Serbia
- Nenince, Slovakia
- Shom, Ukraine
- Amiens, France
- Konya, Turkey
- Borbona, Italy
- Kalvarija, Lithuania
- Nylars, Denmark

== Notable people ==
- Jovan Monasterlija, Habsburg commander
- Klári Katona, singer
