= Pest County 12th constituency =

Constituency in Hungary (2012-)

- Constituency for the National Assembly
- Location of Pest county 12 within Pest county

- Location of Pest county within Hungary
- County: Pest
- Electorate: 73,146 (2026)
- Major settlements: Monor

Current constituency
- Created: 2024
- Party: Tisza Party
- Member: György Polgár
- Elected: 2026

The Pest County 12th parliamentary constituency is one of the 106 constituencies into which the territory of Hungary is divided by Act LXXIX of 2024, and in which voters can elect one member of the National Assembly. The standard abbreviation of the constituency name is: Pest 12. OEVK. The seat is Monor.

== Area ==
The constituency includes the following settlements:

1. Bénye
2. Farmos
3. Gomba
4. Káva
5. Monor
6. Nagykáta
7. Pánd
8. Szentlőrinckáta
9. Szentmártonkáta
10. Tápióbicske
11. Tápiógyörgye
12. Tápióság
13. Tápiószecső
14. Tápiószele
15. Tápiószentmárton
16. Tápiószőlős
17. Tóalmás
18. Úri

== Members ==
The constituency was first represented by László Földi of the KDNP from 2014, and he was re-elected in 2018 and 2022. In the 2026 election, György Polgár of the Tisza Party was elected representative.

Election	Member	Party	%
2014	László Földi	KDNP	44.1
2018	László Földi	KDNP	51.2
2022	László Földi	KDNP	59.1
2026	György Polgár	TISZA	50.20
