= Battle of Tápióbicske =

Battle in the Hungarian revolution of 1849

Coordinates: 47°22′15.7″N 19°41′24.0″E

- Part of the Hungarian Revolution of 1848
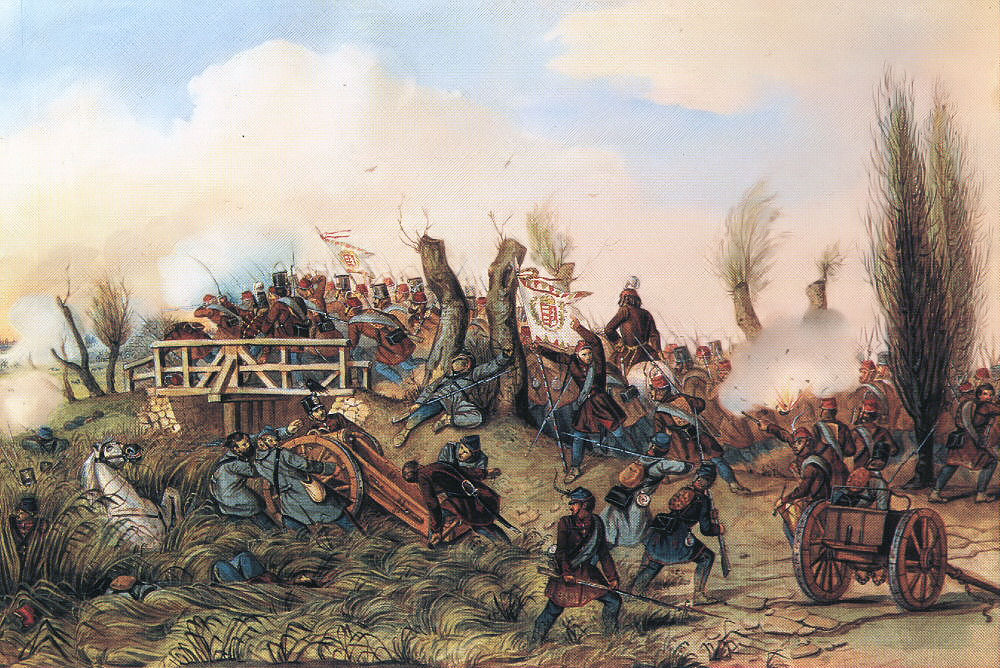
- The Battle of Tápióbicske by Mór Than
Date	4 April 1849
Location	Around and in Tápióbicske, Hungary
Result	Hungarian victory

Belligerents
Hungarian Revolutionary Army; Polish Legion	Austrian Empire: Kingdom of Croatia

Commanders and leaders
Artúr Görgei; György Klapka; János Damjanich; Józef Wysocki	Josip Jelačić; Daniel Rastić (Austrian Empire) Leopold Sternberg

Strength
Total: 22,419; *I. corps: 10,827; *III. corps: 11,592; 63 cannons	2 brigades from the I. corps 16,000 (the total number of the I. corps); 12 cannons

Casualties and losses
around 130 killed	Total: 301; 53 dead 186 wounded and prisoner 62 missing

The Battle of Tápióbicske was a battle in the Spring Campaign of the Hungarian War of Independence (1848–1849), fought on 4 April 1849 between the Austrian Empire and the Hungarian Revolutionary Army. The Habsburg forces consisted of the I Corps of the Imperial Army led by Lieutenant Field Marshal Josip Jelačić. The Hungarians deployed I and III Corps led by General György Klapka and General János Damjanich respectively. Although initially the careless soldiers of the I. corps were put to flight by the Croatian and Austrian soldiers, after entering in their trap, the Hungarians were victorious, thanks to the intervention of the III. corps, and the main Hungarian armies could advance towards the Hungarian capitals (Buda and Pest), forcing the Austrian high commander, Field Marshal Alfred I, Prince of Windisch-Grätz fight a decisive battle at Isaszeg, which would decide the fate of Central and Western Hungary until the intervention of the Russian forces on the Habsburg side in June 1849.

== Background ==
After the Hungarian Revolutionary Army's Spring Campaign started well with a victory at the Battle of Hatvan. Although this victory was not very important, its psychological significance for the Hungarian soldiers, was enormous, facilitating also the success of the plan of the campaign, because of the commander of the III. corps, General Franz Schlik could not gather information about the real size of the opposing army, keeping Windisch-Grätz uncertain about where the Hungarian army will attack from. After the battle Schlik considered that the Hungarian army that faced him was at least 12,000-15,000 stronger, making Windisch-Grätz think that his general was beaten by the main Hungarian army, which is still at Hatvan. On 1 April Görgei gave the order for the I, II, and III Corps, to start their encircling march towards the southwest. General Artúr Görgei, the interim commander-in-chief of the Hungarian armies, issued the marching orders. György Klapka was to depart with I Corps at 4 the next morning towards Tápióbicske via Nagykáta. János Damjanich with III Corps was to set off at 5 am Nagykáta. Lieutenant-Colonel István Szekulits, with II Corps, was to move off at 6 am towards Farmos. The army headquarters was to be at Nagykáta. The Hungarian plan for the Spring Campaign, as elaborated by Antal Vetter, was that VII Corps, commanded by András Gáspár, had to attract the attention of the Austrian Windisch-Grätz by making a feint attack from the direction of Hatvan. Meanwhile, the other three corps (I, II, and III) would encircle the Austrian forces from the southwest and cut them off from Pest and Buda. These three corps needed not to be detected by the Austrians as they advanced towards Windisch-Grätz. On 3 April the I., II., and III. corps marched to Jászberény and Jászjákóhalma, as was scheduled in the marching plan for that day, but although his formulation recommended to his officers to accomplish that night, also the marches scheduled for the next day, these were not carried out, probably because of the fatigue of the soldiers, or the uncertainty about the enemies purposes. On the same day being informed that Jelačić's I. corps marched out of Szolnok, Görgei sent orders to Colonel István Mesterházy stationing at Cibakháza and Colonel Lajos Asbóth stationing at Törökszentmiklós, to cross the Tisza, attack the railroad between Szolnok and Pest, and cause as many damages as possible to the enemy.

On 2 April, Field Marshal Windisch-Grätz ordered Lieutenant General Anton Csorich to march with his division from Vác to Gödöllő, and join with Schlik's III. corps. Jelačić's I. corps, which had the duty to transport away the valuable goods from Szolnok, and to march to Alberti, did not carry out Windisch-Grätz's order because he did not finish the transfer of the salt stock yet. Windisch-Grätz was infuriated by his corps commander's slowness, asking him to hurry to support the III. corps if they needed. In this situation Windisch-Grätz ordered Jelačić to march towards Kóka and Dány, and to watch the Alberti-Monor road with smaller detachments. Receiving this letter at 4:00 p.m., Jelačić promised that on the same day he will march to Tápióbicske, and on the next day, he will continue his march to Tápiószecső, Kóka, and Dány, hoping to reach the last with the bulk of his army at 10:00 a.m. He also mentioned that the Rastić and Sternberg brigades from the rearguard will only arrive at Kóka in the evening. Then he gave the order to his troops to prepare for the march, asking them to hurry. This order was especially hard to be fulfilled for the Rastić brigade, which on that day already made a march from Abony to Cegléd, and now, during the night, he had to move to Alberti, then, only after two hours resting, at 4:00 p.m., they had to continue their way to Kóka, to join with the bulk of the I. first corps.

== Prelude ==
According to Görgei's orders regarding the troops' movements for 4 April, Klapka's I. corps had to march from Jászberény, through Nagykáta, towards Tápióbicske at 4:00 a.m., Damjanich's III. corps follow them at 5:00 a.m. to Nagykáta, while the II. corps had to depart from Jászberény at 6:00 a.m., and march to Farmos, and Nagykáta was designed to be the new headquarters. Klapka planned to depart with his troops an hour earlier than was planned at, 3:00 a.m., but because of an unknown reason, they only departed from Jászberény at 6:00 a.m. On the way he received news from the locals, that Jelačić's troops had spent the night at Tápióbicske but departed, leaving only their baggage and a few soldiers in the village. So, without thinking about the danger of revealing the campaign plan to the enemy, Klapka decided to fall on them by surprise and take this, apparently, easy booty. But in the meanwhile, without Klapka's knowledge, Colonel Leopold Sternberg had arrived in Tápióbicske with his cavalry brigade, as had an infantry brigade under the command of Major-General Daniel Rastić.

On 3 April the bulk of the Jelačić corps arrived in Tápióbicske, while the Rastić and Sternberg brigades reached Tápiószele. The next day in the morning, the bulk of the corps continued its march, arriving at noon at Tápiószecső and Kóka. The Rastić and Sternberg brigades, which followed them from a 15 km distance, arrived at Tápióbicske around 10:00 a.m., from where they could still see the end of the corps supply wagons. Here, after leaving the Croatian banderial hussars in Tápióbicske, colonel Sternberg made a with the rest of the cavalry (8 companies) reconnaissance towards Nagykáta, and finding nothing suspicious in the area which stretched until the Tápió river, he gave to his brigade a longer break to feed their horses.

Meanwhile, the Rastić brigade also arrived at Tápióbicske, and let his soldiers rest for an hour. When this hour was over, right when the brigade started to prepare for leave, suddenly on the hills east of the village, the Hungarian guns started to shoot.

The Hungarians

I. corps

Máriássy division:

- Dipold infantry brigade: 17 infantry companies, 8 cannons = 2475 soldiers
- Bobich infantry brigade: 18 infantry battalions, 6 cannons = 3129 soldiers

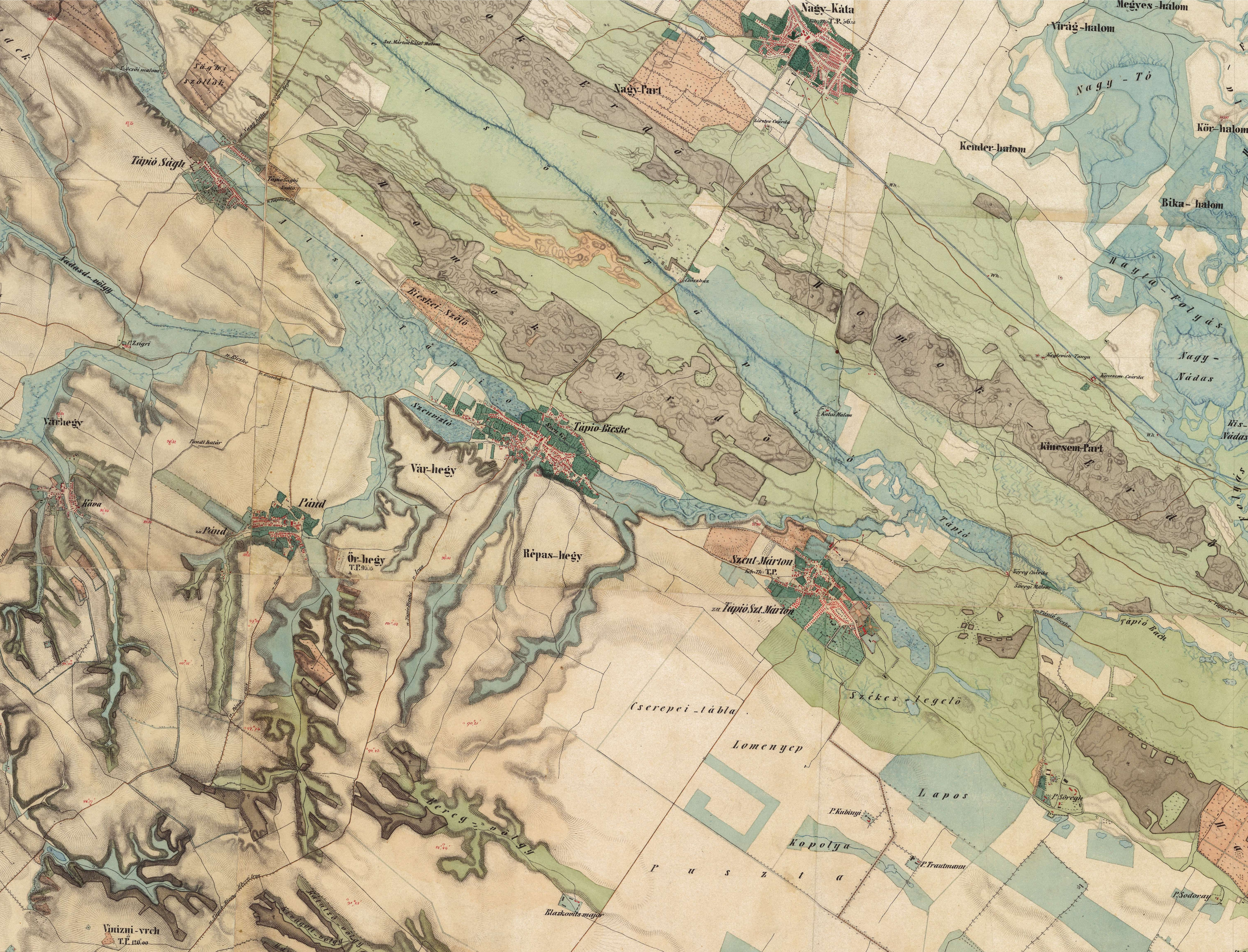
Map of the Battlefield of Tápióbicske (04.04.1849)

Kazinczy division:

- Schulcz infantry brigade: 18 infantry battalions, 8 cannons = 2086 soldiers
- Zákó infantry brigade: 6 infantry battalions, 8 cannons = 1052 soldiers
- Dessewffy cavalry brigade: 16 cavalry battalions = 2085 soldiers

III. corps

Knezić division:

- Kiss infantry brigade: 16 infantry companies, 8 cannons = 2658 soldiers
- Kökényessi infantry brigade: 15 infantry companies, 3 cannons = 2511 soldiers

Wysocki division:

- Leiningen infantry brigade: 12 infantry companies, 8 cannons = 1772 soldiers
- Czillich infantry brigade: 16 infantry companies, 8 cannons = 2373 soldiers
- Kászonyi cavalry brigade: 16 cavalry battalions, 6 cannons = 2278 soldiers

The Austrians

- Rastić infantry brigade: 1. battalion of the 2. border guards regiment (6 infantry companies), 2. battalion of the 2. border guards regiment (6 infantry companies), 3. battalion of the 3.-4. combined border guards regiment (6 infantry companies), 5. battalion of the 10. border guards regiment (4 infantry companies), 1. six pounder infantry battery (6 cannons)
- Sternberg cavalry brigade: 3. dragoon regiment (6 cavalry companies), 3. cuirassier regiment (2 cavalry companies), Ban's Hussars (6 cavalry companies), 10. cavalry battery (6 cannons)
- 7. cuirassier regiment (2 cavalry companies)

From the Austrian side, only two brigades were involved in the battle. The Rastić infantry brigade, and the Sternberg cavalry brigade. Unfortunately, there are no data about the exact number of the soldiers of these two brigades. So we can only estimate their number, knowing the number of the companies of these brigades: 22 infantry and 16 cavalry companies. The number of soldiers in an infantry company from the armies in the Habsburg empire was between 214 and 234 men, while the cavalry companies had 178 officers and soldiers, as well as a couple of assistants, which counted also as soldiers. So the two Austrian brigades involved in the battle had, in total, around 7556-7996 soldiers.

== Battle ==
Klapka attacked Tápióbicske, where he thought to find only minor units with the Dipold brigade as the vanguard, supported by the Bobich brigade and 4 companies of the Koburg hussars, while the rest of the corps (the Sulcz and Zákó brigades and the cavalry division led by Colonel Arisztid Dessewffy) remained in reserve on the shore of the Tápió river. Klapka sent envoys to inform Damjanich and Görgei about his action. The vanguard crossed the Tápió river on the unprotected bridge, then repulsed the weak Croatian vanguard, found on the other side of the river, which retreated northwest from Tápióbicske, The Hungarians deployed on the sand dunes along the road which led to Tápióbicske. Klapka sent envoys to inform Damjanich and Görgei about his action. Only when the Hungarians started to shoot with their cannons Tápióbicske, learned Major General Daniel Rastić about their presence. The latter quickly ordered his troops to prepare for the battle, but to win them some time for this, he sent the 6 companies of Croatian banderial hussars in attack, then deployed his 6-pounder battery, under the protection of the Ogulin-Slunj border guard battalion, on a hill which laid 1000 paces northwest from the village. Meanwhile, the Dipold brigade repulsed the attack of the Banderial Hussars, which retreated behind the village, then entered Tápióbicske, which they thought unoccupied by the enemy, in tight company columns. But here they were caught by surprise by the crossfire (or a bayonet charge) of two Otočac battalions, hidden among and in the houses of the village and suffered heavy losses. When the Croatians appeared at the back of the Hungarians, closing their way of retreat, Captain Dénes Bég took the lead of the battalions and attacked the Croatian battalion attacking from behind, breaking the encirclement, and running out from the village Although, initially, the Hungarian retreat was ordered, the close pursuit of the enemy caused panic among the soldiers, who started to retreat in disorder towards the Tápió bridge. The soldiers of the fleeing Dipold-brigade ran into the Bobich-brigade which had just crossed the river and deployed its horse battery, causing disorder and panic among them. Their infectious panic routed Bobich's infantry and artillery as well, then also the Sulcz and Zákó brigades, which were waiting in the reserve outside of Tápióbicske. Because of the frequent rains in the last few days, the water of the, usually shallow river was swollen, and many soldiers, who, instead of the crowded bridge, tried to cross Tápió by swimming, drowned in the marshy waters. Two of the 12-pounder cannons, which they tried to bring over the river, sunk, while 5 were captured by the enemy. The Hungarians also lost an entire battery because the gunners were confused by the attacking enemy infantry with theirs, due to them having the same color uniforms.

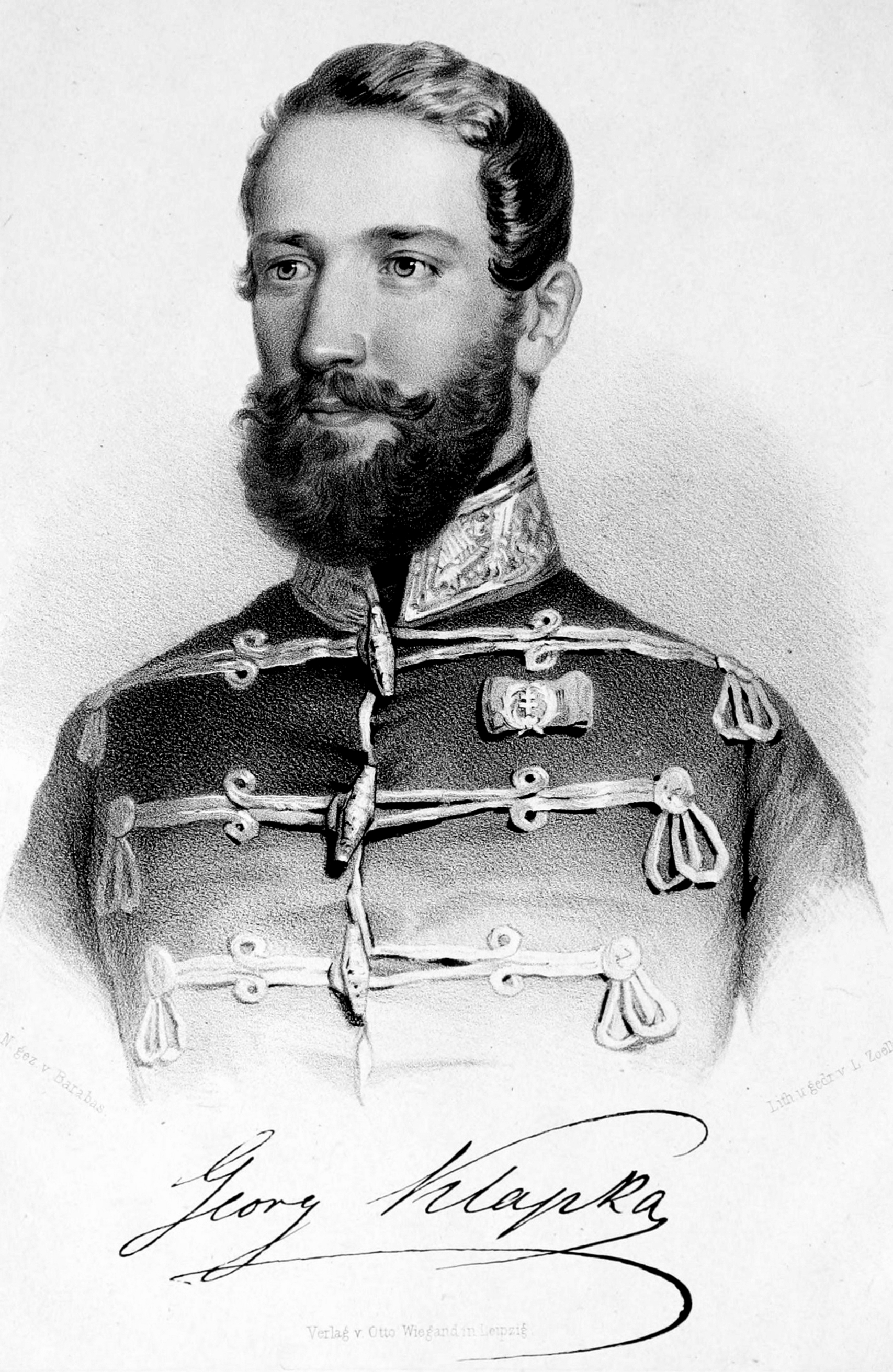
Portrait of György Klapka

This predisposition to panic was a common problem in the Hungarian revolutionary army because they often used irregulars alongside the regular soldiers, especially in the first months of the Hungarian War of Independence. The panicking irregulars caused major problems, for example in the Battle of Schwechat. This was due to the poor quality of their training, or the short period of their instruction, caused by the urgent need for new troops to replace losses and the pressures of defending a country attacked from every direction, and the unpreparedness and lack of training of the officers; all of these down to the fact that the Hungarian army was only a few months old, while its enemy, the Habsburg army was the product of many centuries of uninterrupted institutional tradition.

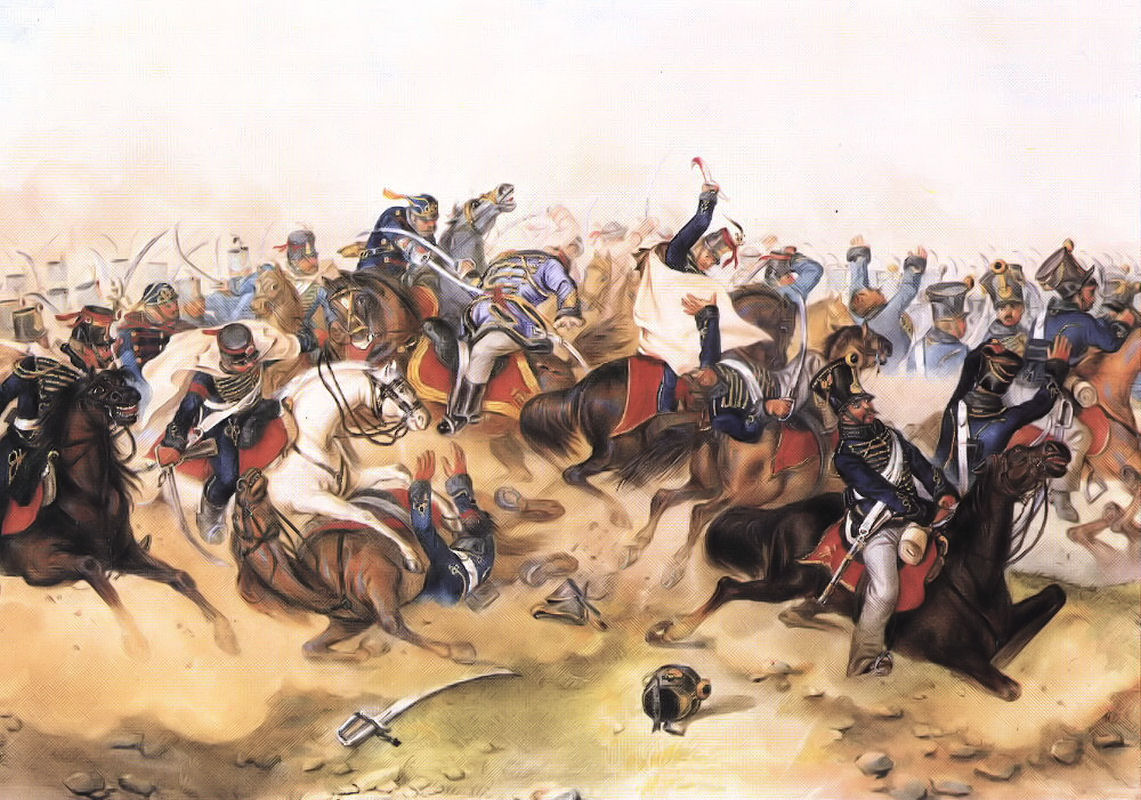
Than Mór: Cavalry fight in the battle of Tápióbicske with the duel of Alajos Sebő and Hermann Riedesel

To save his troops from the disaster, Klapka sent the VIIIth (Koburg) and the I. (imperial) and hussar regiments to stop the advancing enemy. 4 companies of Koburg VIIIth (Koburg) hussar regiment along the Tápióbicske road to stop the charging two Otočac battalions, but they too were put to flight by the bayonet charge of the Croatian infantry.

Right to them I. (imperial) hussars came face to face with the Croatian Ban's Hussars, who were also participating in the pursuit of the Hungarian infantry. At the head of the I. Hussar Regiment was Major Alajos Sebő, a very good officer, while at the head of the Croats was Major Hermann Riedesel, a strapping man, one of the best duelists in the imperial army. The two men knew each other. Riedesel challenged Sebő to a duel, and this he accepted, despite fearing that he would certainly be killed, as he said later, to set a courageous example for his regiment, which was known as one of the weakest in the Hungarian army. After they had charged each other twice, neither of them was wounded, but on the third charge, after Riedesel had injured his hand or arm, Sebő made his smaller and quicker horse push the Austrian officer's horse, causing him to lose his balance, then struck him down with his sword, slashing Riedesel's face, who fell down dead.

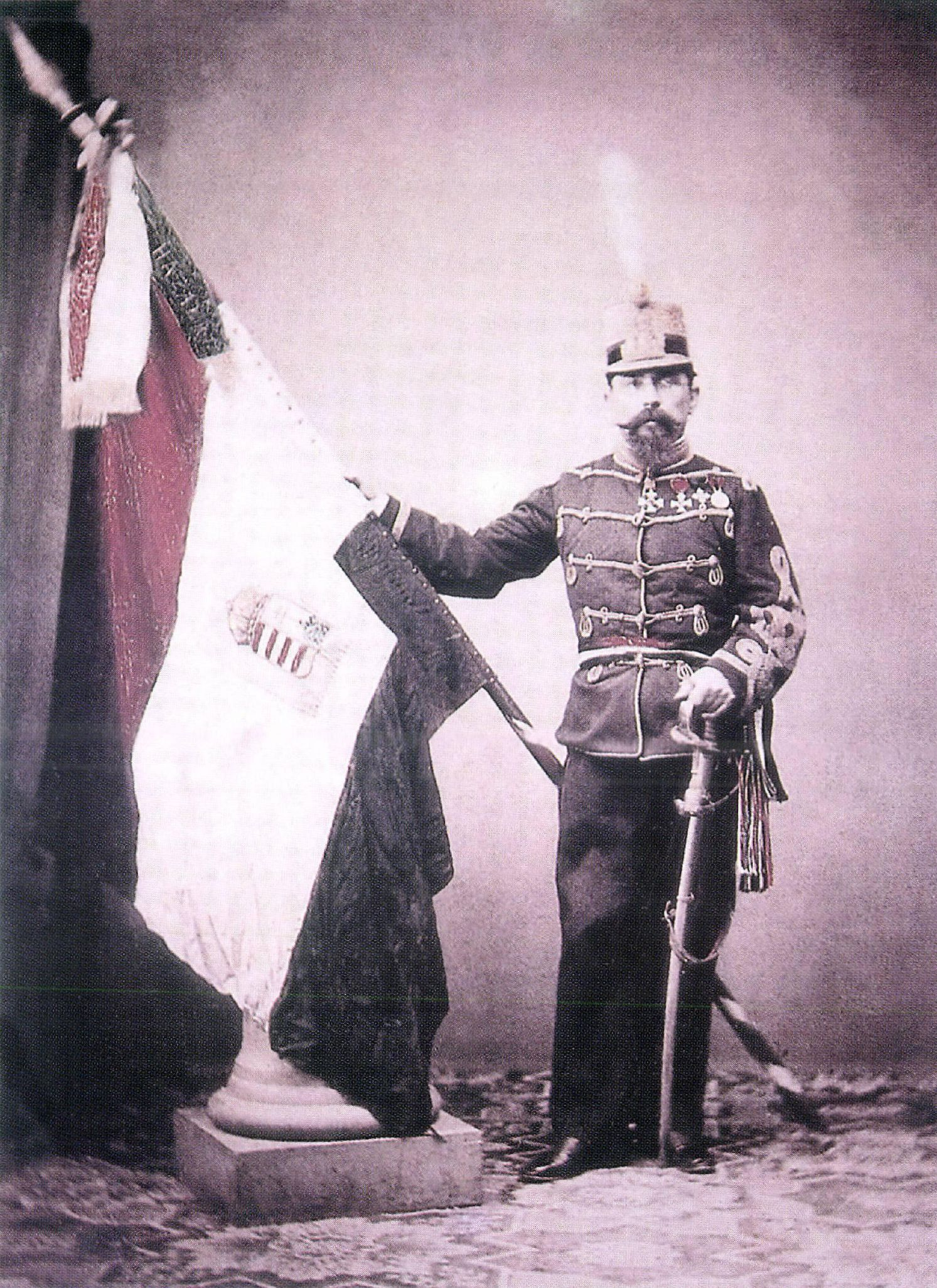
Károly Földváry as a soldier of the Hungarian Legion fighting in the Italian War for Unification. Foto: 1863

After Sebő's success, the Hungarian hussars drove the Croat cavalry back but were halted by the imperial artilleries and the Croat border guard battalions' fire, and when also the Sternberg cavalry battalion returned from the direction of Nagykáta, they retreated over the bridge, to the other side of the Tápió river. The retreat of the cavalry caused again chaos among the Hungarian troops, who started a hasty retreat, which was contributed to by the fact that Klapka lost contact with his troops while trying to cross the river, but not on the bridge filled with retreating soldiers, but on a ford far from the bridge. Because of this he arrived only in the evening at Nagykáta, to meet with his troops, which lacked his presence during the rest of the battle. Taking advantage of the Hungarian retreat, the Rastić, and Sternberg brigades crossed the river via the bridge, took 10 Hungarian cannons and 4 ammunition caissons, and captured two Hungarian officers and 123 men. The Croat batteries fired at the retreating Hungarians, who were fortunate that the terrain on this side of the river was quite broken ground, so the Austrian cavalry could not do its job of pursuing the retreating forces.

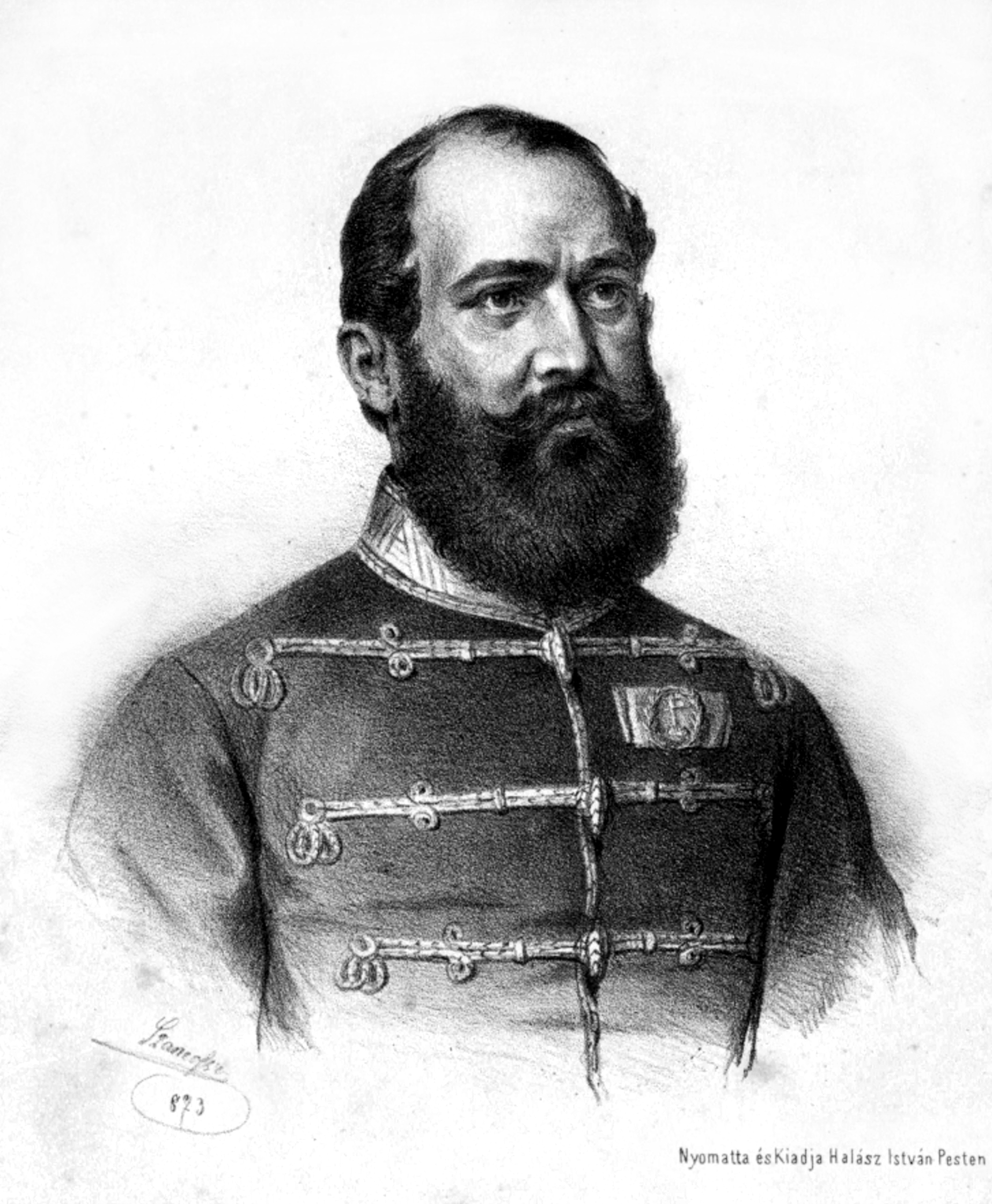
Damjanich János

Meanwhile, General János Damjanich, following, with the Wysocki division, the III. corps arrived at Nagykáta, and when they prepared to set up camp, they heard the sound of the guns from the direction of Tápióbicske. Damjanich immediately ordered the division, to take up arms and take defensive positions southeast of Nagykáta. Around 1:30 p.m. Görgei too arrived with his suite to Nagykáta, and ordered to the Wysocki division to rush towards Tápióbicske. Arriving on the battlefield, he saw the fleeing soldiers of the I. corps and tried unsuccessfully to stop the I. Corps soldiers retreat and get them into battle order.

Görgei ordered the Wysocki division to attack the bridge and take it back from the enemy, sending also the soldiers of the, earlier fleeing, but now regrouped I. corps, to support them. First of all Görgei deployed the two batteries under the leadership of Captain Freudenreich and Captain Philippovsky, on the left side of the road, the shootings of these batteries, forced the Austrian cavalry battery placed in front of the bridge to retreat. Shortly after that appeared before the bridge the Hungarian armies two famous battalions: the 9. "Red Hatted" battalion, and the 3. battalion, "White Feathered" battalion, followed by the 3. battalion of the 19. infantry regiment. The Hungarians, after a short exchange of fire with the enemy, charged, forcing the Croatians to retreat over the bridge, to the other side of the Tápió river, from where, in a favorable position, they tried to prevent the Hungarians to cross it. First the "Red Hatted" battalion attacked the bridge, but they jammed up on the narrow path, being caught in a harsh enemy fusillade, losing many soldiers, causing them to retreat. Seeing this, Damjanich sent the 3. "White Feathered" battalion to attack the bridge, led by their commander, Major Károly Földváry, renowned for his extraordinary bravery in many battles, led his soldiers against the bridge. Before they arrived there, they met the "Red Hatted" Battalion, led by Lieutenant Colonel Pál Kiss, which meanwhile regrouped, and were preparing to attack again the bridge. Here, without giving any attention to the volley of the enemy bullets, the two battalions started to argue about which of them will first cross the bridge first. Because of the great rivalry between these two battalions, none of them wanted to let the other cross it first. Major Földváry resolved this problem by taking in his hand also the 9. battalions flag, and shouting: Then let's charge with united forces! Then the two battalions attacked together the enemy positioned in front of the bridge, shooting at them, and pushing them back, establishing a foothold on the other bank of the Tápió. The 3. and the 9. battalions were followed by the rest of the Wysocki division, as well as the soldiers of the I. corps, wiping in this way the stain off their honor, for their shameful retreat at the start of the battle. Major-General Daniel Rastić gathered his troops on the dunes in front of Tápióbicske, and withstand the Hungarian attacks, and their counterattack shook the Hungarian lines, forcing them to start to retreat. But Lieutenant Colonel Károly Leiningen-Westerburg stopped his soldiers and sent them to counterattack. Meanwhile, all the Wysocki division crossed the Tápió, and with the support of the canister fire of Captain Freudenreich's two cannons, the Hungarians executed a bayonet charge, forcing the soldiers of Daniel Rastić to retreat through the village, which he burned, in order to slow down the Hungarian advance. Rastić stopped with a portion of his troops on the heights west of Tápióbicske, in order to secure the retreat of the bulk of his army towards Tápióság. Despite the Hungarian artillery hurrying after the retreating brigades, they climbed the heights behind the village, which caused them to delay, so it could not cause them any damage. The battle ended around 5:00 .p.m.

The Archduke Ferdinand and Hannover Hussar regiments from the cavalry of the III. Corps led by Colonel József Nagysándor tried to pursue the retreating Austrians, but they went in quite the opposite direction, towards Pánd, instead of Tápióság, and when they finally found out their mistake and, changing their way, started to ride in the right direction, they could not catch up the retreating enemy.

Meanwhile, the Hungarian I. and III. corps made camp for the night on the heights southwest to Tápióbicske. On the same day the II. corps arrived to Nagykáta, where Görgei installed his headquarters.

The Austrian Sternberg and Rastić brigades arrived at 8:00 p.m. in Szecső, joining Jelačić's Ia. corps.

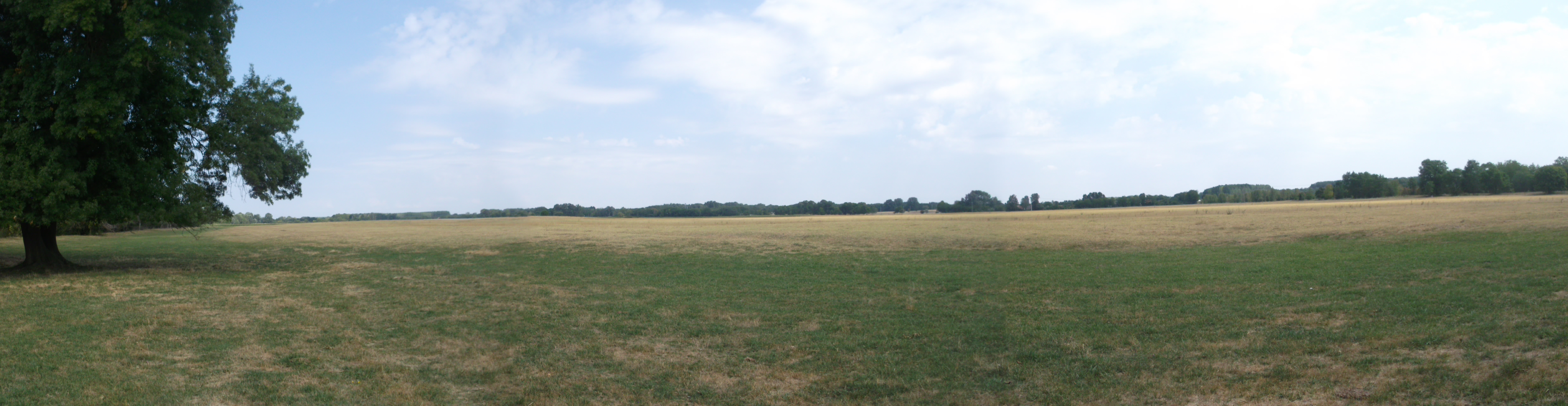
The Tápióbicske battlefield in 2022

== Aftermath ==
The Hungarian victory was made bitter-sweet by the fact that the enemy captured 10 guns, and although they managed to take back 6, partially spiked cannons, the other 4 were taken away by the enemy. Additionally, György Klapka, normally a very capable general, had made a considerable tactical error in giving the order to attack Tápióbicske, because in doing so he had revealed the location of his troops. Because of this, Görgei did not dare to give the order for the encirclement of the main imperial forces at Isaszeg and Gödöllő. According to László Pusztaszeri, Klapka thereby prevented a decisive Hungarian victory over Windisch-Grätz. Róbert Hermann believes that although Görgei was uncertain what to do, he finally decided to order his troops to continue their movements according to the initial plan.

On the other hand, after the battle on 4 April, Jelačić falsely reported a Croat victory over the Hungarians. This misled Windisch-Grätz, who did not understand what was happening on the south-eastern front, and contributed to him ordering the Ban of Croatia (Jelačić) to pursue the Hungarians, who in reality were not fleeing but nearing Gödöllő. He was totally unclear about where the Hungarian forces really were and feared that their main forces would get around him either from the south, cutting his lines of communication with the capital, or from the north, liberating the fortress of Komárom from the imperial siege. So Windisch-Grätz scattered his forces on a 54-kilometer front, which made it impossible for his troops to support each other effectively (some units were more than a day's march apart). In contrast, the Hungarian front line was only 22 kilometers long, and so at all times during the battle, Görgei could concentrate up to two-thirds of his force at any point of his front line. Windisch-Grätz's error reduced his chance of victory against the Hungarian main forces in the Battle of Isaszeg which followed two days after Tápióbicske. The correspondence, on 4–5 April between Windisch-Grätz and Jelačić, shows that they both were uncertain about where is the Hungarian main force, and from which direction will attack, which underlines the fact that the failure of the Ban of Croatia to communicate the real outcome of the battle, as well the hesitating character of Windisch-Grätz, undone Klapa's errors made in the Battle of Tápióbicske, making possible one of the most important purposes of the Hungarian campaign: encircling and crushing the Austrian main army in front of Budapest, or to push them towards Vác, preventing them to retreat through the capital city, to remain still achievable.

== Legacy ==
Twenty years later after the Battle of Tápióbicske, the great Hungarian novelist, Mór Jókai, used two events from this battle in his novel The Baron's Sons (A kőszívű ember fiai). Both these events are related to duels that happened during the battle. Interestingly the Battle of Tápióbicske is not depicted in The Baron's Sons, the two duels being integrated into the depictions of two other battles from the 1848-1849 War of Independence. First, in chapter XIX. with the title Királyerdőben (In the Royal Forest), the duel during the Battle of Isaszeg between two of its fictional characters, the Hungarian hussar Richárd Baradlay and the Austrian officer Otto Palvicz is inspired by the fight between Major Alajos Sebő and Major Hermann Riedesel. In the same novel, in chapter XXIII. with the title Zenit (A Duel Between Brothers), before the siege of Buda two of the main characters of the novel, Richárd and Ödön Baradlay started an argument, in which Richárd called Ödön a coward, as a result of which, Ödön challenged his brother to a duel. But they decided not to fight with weapons against each other but by trying to enter first in the castle, by climbing the walls during the final assault of the Buda castle. The first who managed to do this was the winner of the duel. The event which inspired this episode of the novel was the "revolutionary duel" between Lieutenant Colonel Pál Kiss and Lieutenant Colonel Károly Leiningen-Westerburg during the battle of Tápióbicske. On the day before the battle, the two entered into a heated argument after General János Damjanich decided to take away from his command the 9. battalion and put it under Kiss's command. The 9. battalion was earlier under Kiss's command, so he too was attached to the famous "Red Hatted" battalion, so they entered a heated argument, at the end of which Leiningen challenged Kiss to a duel. During the battle of Tápióbicske on the next day, when the 9. battalion, still under the lead of Leiningen, was preparing to attack the bridge, Kiss appeared and wanted to take the lead of the battalion. Leiningen replied that the fight for the bridge will decide the argument between the two: the one who will be the braver and the more effective in driving the Austrian soldiers away, will win their duel. This episode inspired the two Baradlay brothers "duel" in Jókai's novel.

== Sources ==
- Bánlaky, József (2001). A magyar nemzet hadtörténelme (The Military History of the Hungarian Nation XXI) (in Hungarian). Budapest: Arcanum Adatbázis.
- Bóna, Gábor (1987). Tábornokok és törzstisztek a szabadságharcban 1848–49 ("Generals and Staff Officers in the War of Independence 1848–1849") (in Hungarian). Budapest: Zrínyi Katonai Kiadó. p. 430. ISBN 963-326-343-3.
- Csikány, Tamás (2015). A szabadságharc hadművészete 1848-1849 ("The Military Art of the Freedom War 1848–1849") (in Hungarian). Budapest: Zrínyi Katonai Kiadó. p. 382. ISBN 978-963-327-647-1.
- Hermann, Róbert (2018). "A tápióbicskei ütközet. 1849 április 4-én" [The Battle of Tápiobicske. On 4 April 1849]. In Pelyach, István (ed.). Damjanich János : "a mindig győztes" tábornok [János Damjanich : "The Always Victorious General"]. New York: Line Design. pp. 171–194. ISBN 978-963-480-006-4.
- Hermann, Róbert (1996). Az 1848–1849 évi forradalom és szabadságharc története ("The history of the Hungarian Revolution and War of Independence of 1848–1849) (in Hungarian). Budapest: Videopont. p. 464. ISBN 963-8218-20-7.
- Hermann, Róbert (2001). Az 1848–1849-es szabadságharc hadtörténete ("Military History of the Hungarian War of Independence of 1848–1849") (in Hungarian). Budapest: Korona Kiadó. p. 424. ISBN 963-9376-21-3.
- Hermann, Róbert (2004). Az 1848–1849-es szabadságharc nagy csatái ("Great battles of the Hungarian War of Independence of 1848–1849") (in Hungarian). Budapest: Zrínyi. p. 408. ISBN 963-327-367-6.
- Jókai, Mór (1900). The Baron's Sons. Boston: L.A C. Page and Company (Incorporated) 1900.
- Nobili, Johann. Hungary 1848: The Winter Campaign. Edited and translated Christopher Pringle. Warwick, UK: Helion & Company Ltd., 2021.
- Pászti, László (2013). A magyar honvédsereg harcászata az 1848–49-es szabadságharcban ("Strategics of the Hungarian Honvéd Army in the 1848/49 Revolution and War of Independence") (in Hungarian). Budapest: Hadtörténeti intézet és Múzeum Könyvtára. p. 270. ISBN 978-963-7097-63-8.
- Pusztaszeri, László (1984). Görgey Artúr a szabadságharcban ("Artúr Görgey in the War of Independence") (in Hungarian). Budapest: Magvető Könyvkiadó. p. 784. ISBN 963-14-0194-4.
- Szabó, Attila (2007). Tápióbicske (in Hungarian). Budapest: NKÖEOK Szerkesztőség. Száz magyar falu könyvesháza. ISBN 963 9287 16 4.
