= Monor District =

Coordinates: 47.3500°N 19.4500°E

Monor District Monori járás
- Districts of Hungary
- Coat of arms

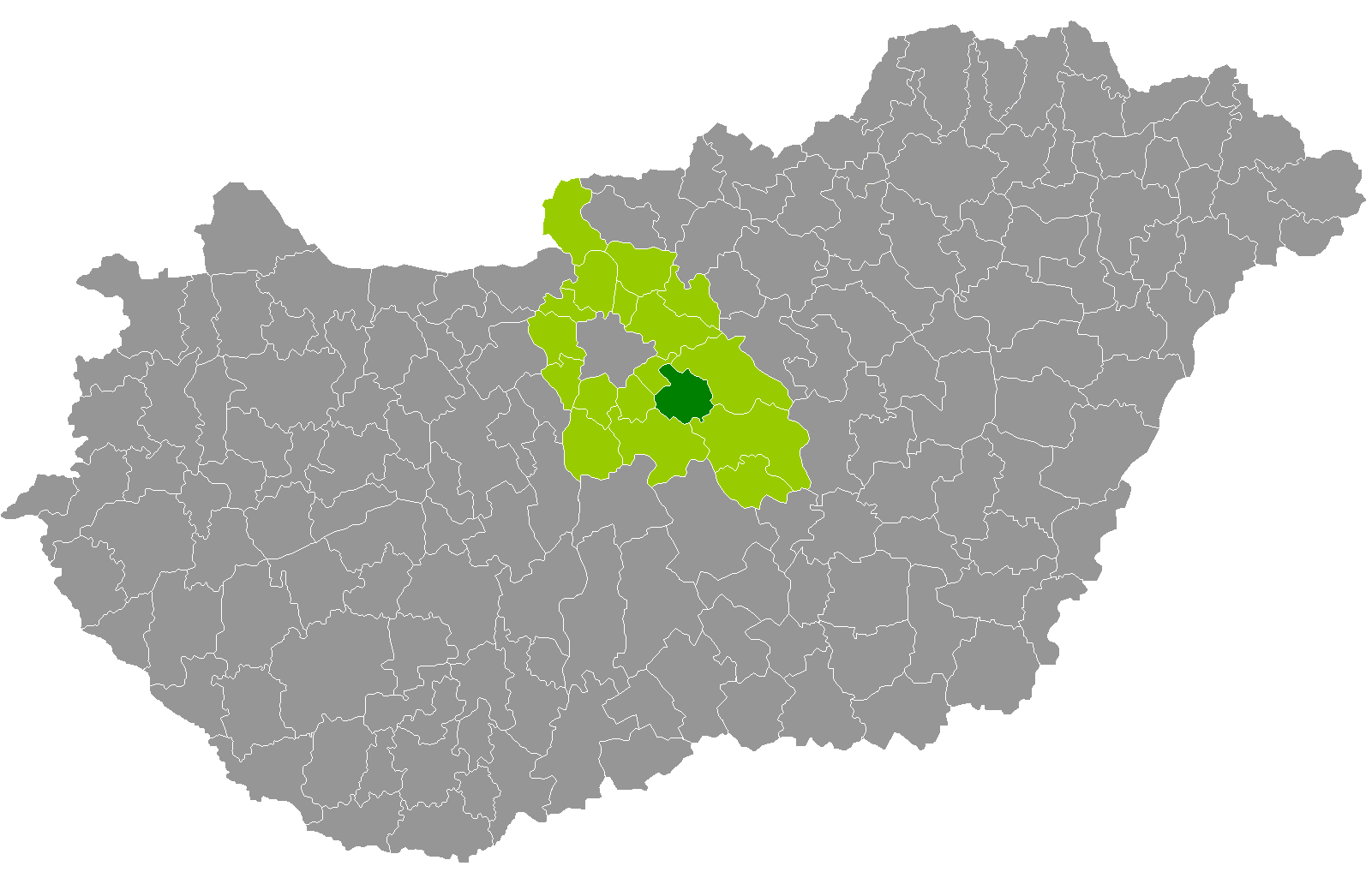
- Monor District within Hungary and Pest County.
- Country: Hungary
- County: Pest
- District seat: Monor

Area
  - Total: 329.81 km^{2} (127.34 sq mi)
  - Rank: 9th in Pest

Population (2011 census)
  - Total: 64,016
  - Rank: 10th in Pest
  - Density: 194/km^{2} (500/sq mi)

Monor (Hungarian: Monori járás) is a district in central-eastern part of Pest County. Monor is also the name of the town where the district seat is found. The district is located in the Central Hungary Statistical Region.

== Geography ==
Monor District borders with Nagykáta District to the northeast, Cegléd District to the southeast, Dabas District to the south, Gyál District to the west, Vecsés District to the northwest. The number of the inhabited places in Monor District is 12.

== Municipalities ==
The district has 3 towns and 9 villages. (ordered by population, as of 1 January 2013)

- Bénye (1,193)
- Csévharaszt (1,895)
- Gomba (2,951)
- **Gyömrő** (16,466)
- Káva (664)
- **Monor** (17,677) – district seat
- Monorierdő (4,116)
- Nyáregyháza (3,693)
- Pánd (2,006)
- Péteri (2,185)
- **Pilis** (11,498)
- Vasad (1,889)

The bolded municipalities are cities.

== Demographics ==
Religion in Monor District (2011 census)
1. Calvinism (16.6%)
2. Lutheranism (8.70%)
3. Catholic Church (23.5%)
4. Greek Catholicism (0.70%)
5. Other religions (2.90%)
6. Non-religious (16.2%)
7. Atheists (1.30%)
8. Undeclared (30.1%)

In 2011, it had a population of 64,016 and the population density was 194/km^{2}.

Year	County population	Change
2011	64,016	n/a

=== Ethnicity ===
Besides the Hungarian majority, the main minorities are the Roma (approx. 1,400), Romanian (450), German (400) and Slovak (300).

Total population (2011 census): 64,016
Ethnic groups (2011 census): Identified themselves: 58,414 persons:

- Hungarians: 55,071 (94.28%)
- Gypsies: 1,435 (2.46%)
- Others and indefinable: 1,908 (3.27%)

Approx. 5,500 persons in Monor District did not declare their ethnic group at the 2011 census.

=== Religion ===
Religious adherence in the county according to 2011 census:

- Catholic – 15,471 (Roman Catholic – 15,023; Greek Catholic – 438);
- Reformed – 10,641;
- Evangelical – 5,536;
- other religions – 1,829;
- Non-religious – 10,395;
- Atheism – 852;
- Undeclared – 19,292.

== Gallery ==
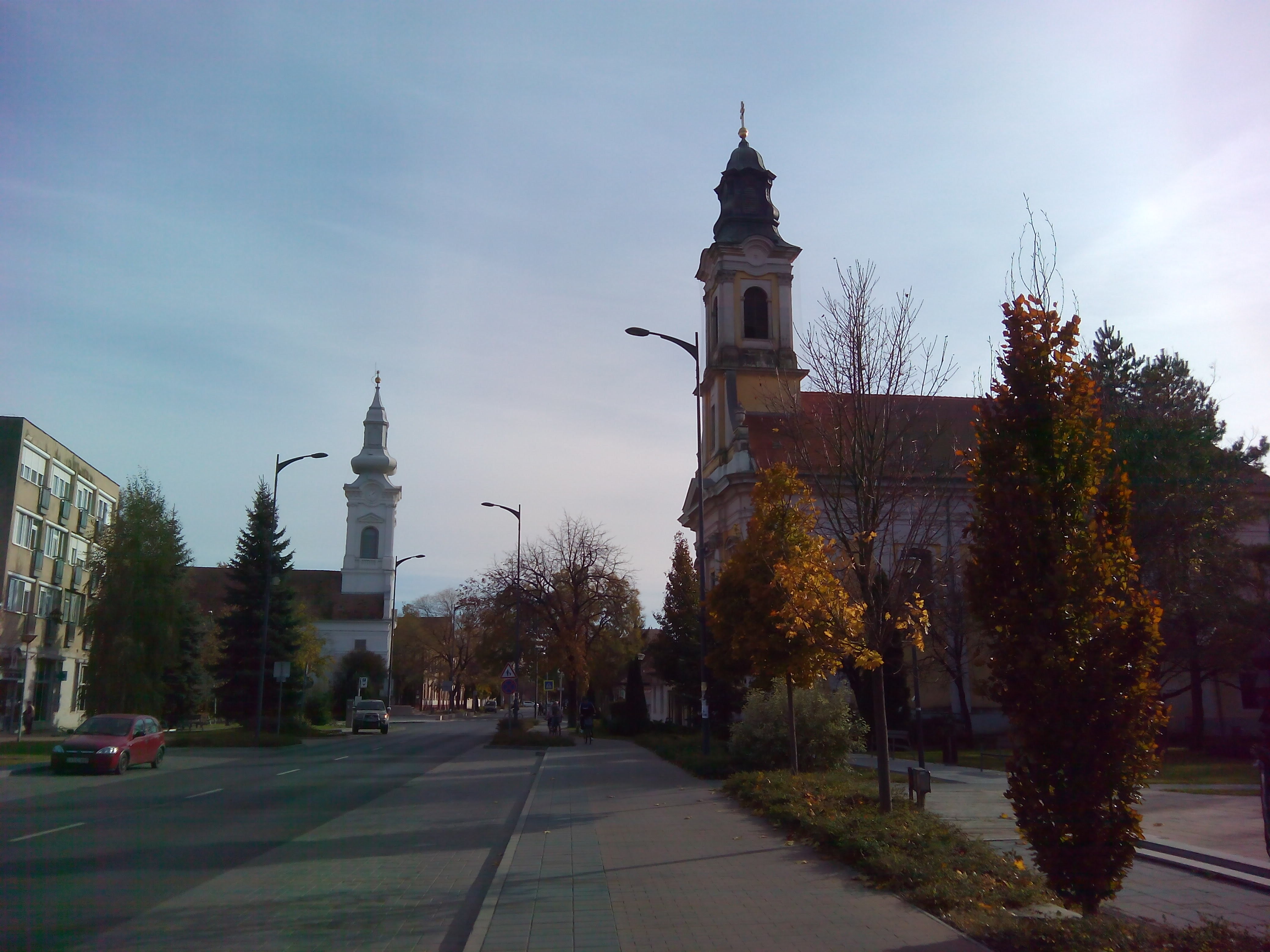
View of Monor

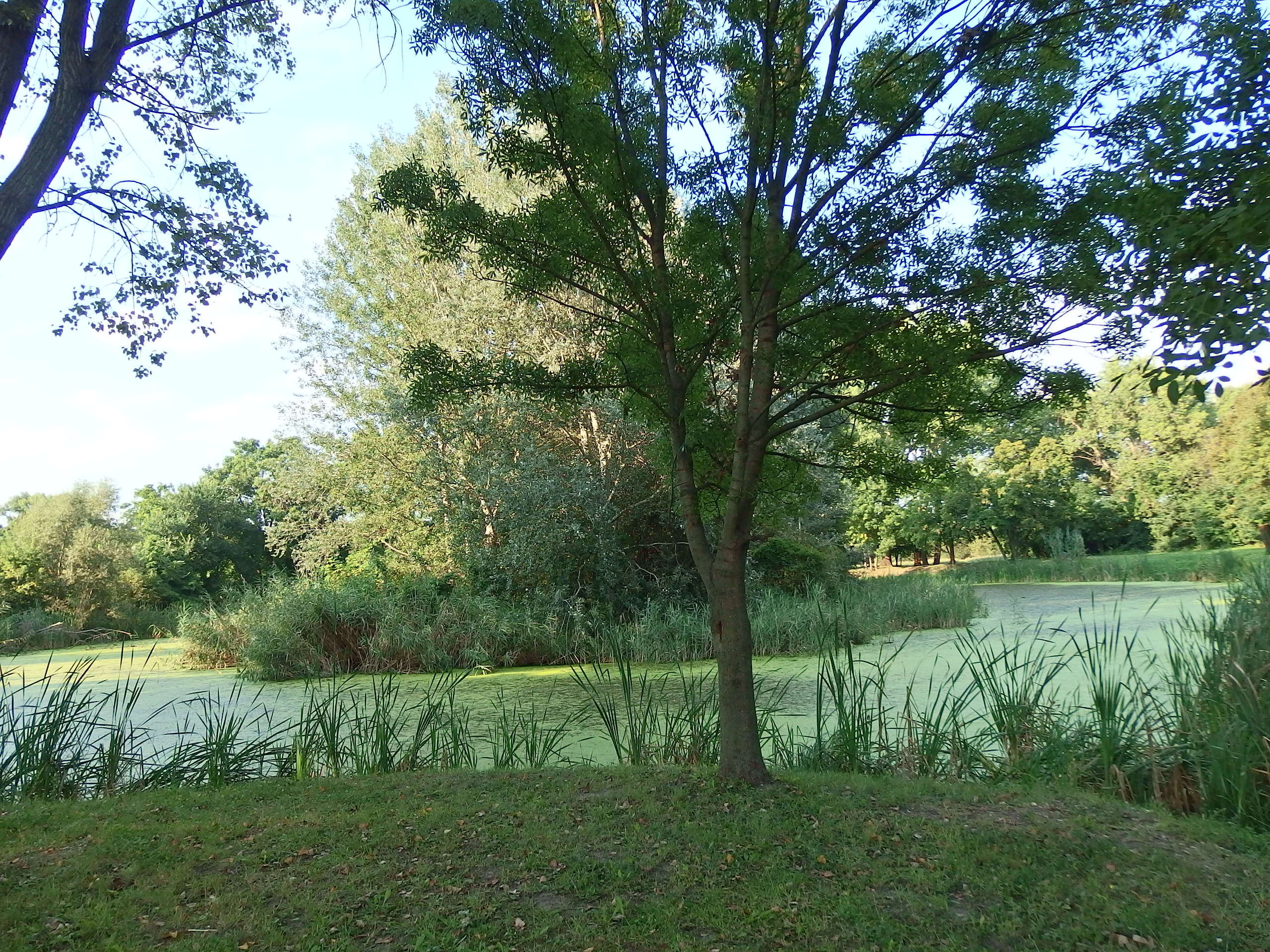
Landscape near Pilis

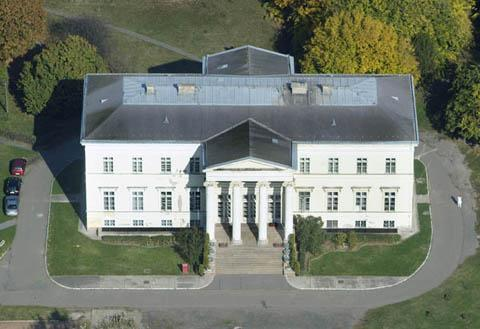
Teleki Mansion in Gyömrő

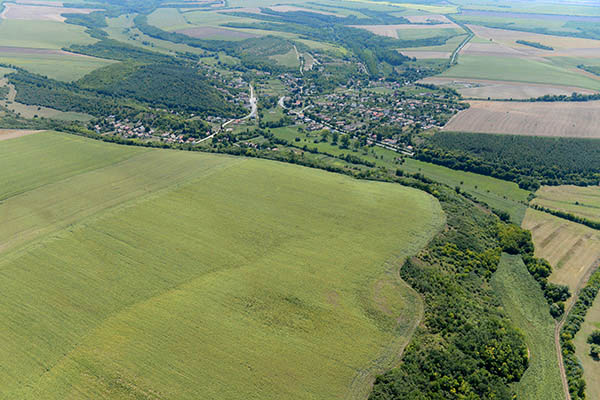
Aerial view of Káva

== See also ==
- List of cities and towns in Hungary
