= Nagykáta District =

Coordinates: 47.4167°N 19.7333°E

Nagykáta District Nagykátai járás
- Districts of Hungary
- Coat of arms

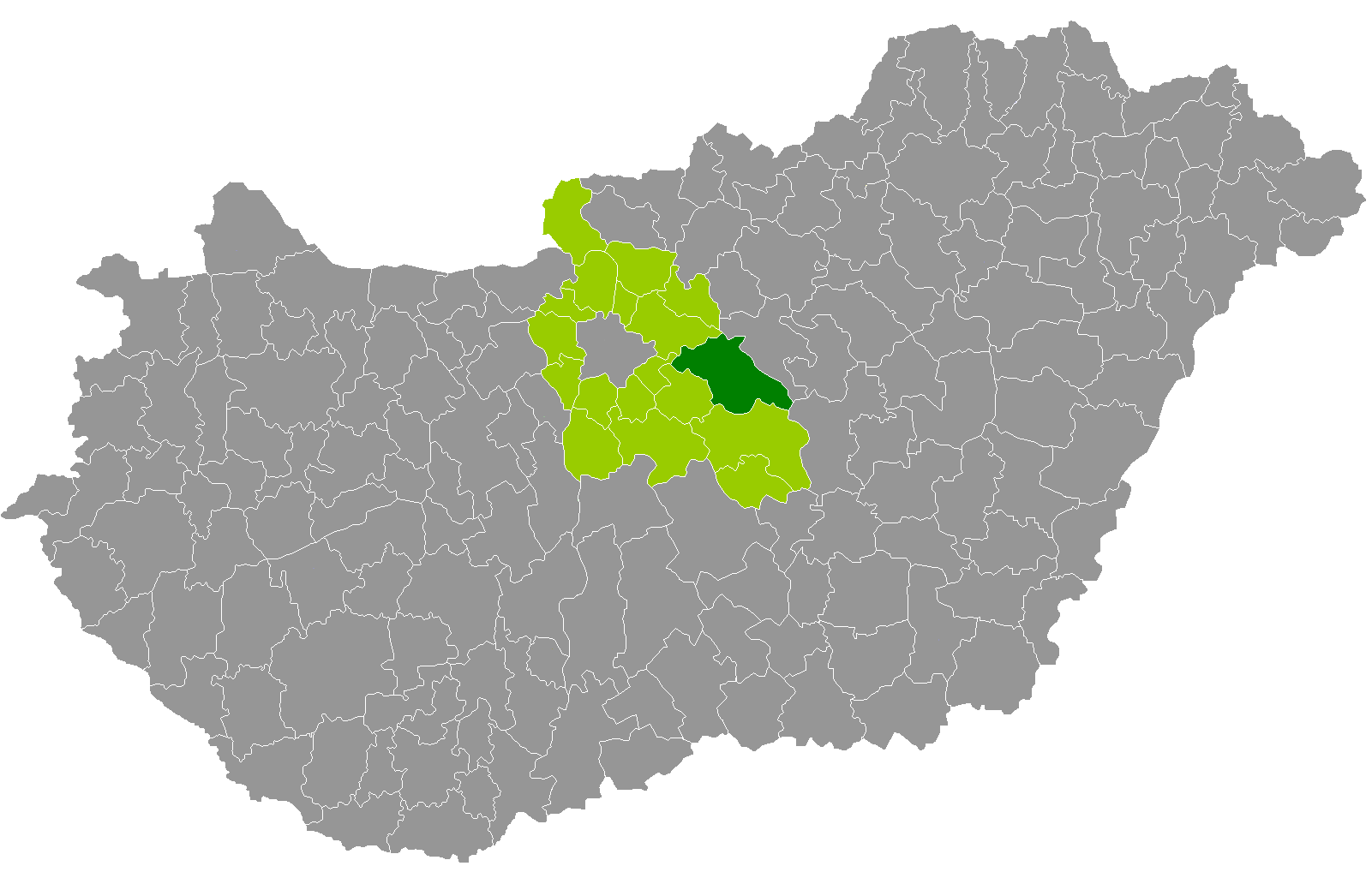
- Nagykáta District within Hungary and Pest County.
- Country: Hungary
- County: Pest
- District seat: Nagykáta

Area
  - Total: 710.12 km^{2} (274.18 sq mi)
  - Rank: 2nd in Pest

Population (2011 census)
  - Total: 73,959
  - Rank: 8th in Pest
  - Density: 104/km^{2} (270/sq mi)

Nagykáta (Hungarian: Nagykátai járás) is a district in eastern part of Pest County. Nagykáta is also the name of the town where the district seat is found. The district is located in the Central Hungary Statistical Region.

== Geography ==
Nagykáta District borders with Jászberény District (Jász-Nagykun-Szolnok County) to the northeast, Szolnok District (Jász-Nagykun-Szolnok County) to the east, Cegléd District to the south, Monor District and Vecsés District to the southwest, Aszód District to the northwest. The number of the inhabited places in Nagykáta District is 15.

== Municipalities ==
The district has 3 towns, 2 large villages and 10 villages (population, as of 1 January 2013)

- Farmos (3,507)
- Kóka (4,316)
- Mende (4,133)
- **Nagykáta** (12,576) – district seat
- **Sülysáp** (8,188)
- Szentlőrinckáta (1,915)
- Szentmártonkáta (4,905)
- Tápióbicske (3,331)
- Tápiógyörgye (3,461)
- Tápióság (2,586)
- Tápiószecső (6,162)
- **Tápiószele** (5,992)
- Tápiószentmárton (5,298)
- Tóalmás (3,219)
- Úri (2,573)

The bolded municipalities are cities, italics municipalities are large villages.

== Demographics ==
Religion in Nagykáta District (2011 census)
1. Catholic Church (51.0%)
2. Greek Catholicism (0.40%)
3. Calvinism (7.40%)
4. Lutheranism (2.00%)
5. Other religions (1.70%)
6. Non-religious (11.4%)
7. Atheists (0.70%)
8. Undeclared (25.4%)

In 2011, it had a population of 73,959 and the population density was 104/km².

Year	County population	Change
2011	73,959	n/a

=== Ethnicity ===
Besides the Hungarian majority, the main minorities are the Roma (approx. 2,250), German and Romanian (275).

Total population (2011 census): 73,959
Ethnic groups (2011 census): Identified themselves: 67,414 persons:

- Hungarians: 64,033 (94.98%)
- Roma: 2,233 (3.31%)
- Others and indefinable: 1,148 (1.70%)

Approx. 5,500 persons in Nagykáta District did not declare their ethnic group at the 2011 census.

=== Religion ===
Religious adherence in the county according to 2011 census:

- Catholic – 37,980 (Roman Catholic – 37,697; Greek Catholic – 277);
- Reformed – 5,474;
- Evangelical – 1,527;
- other religions – 1,251;
- Non-religious – 8,408;
- Atheism – 556;
- Undeclared – 18,763.

== Gallery ==
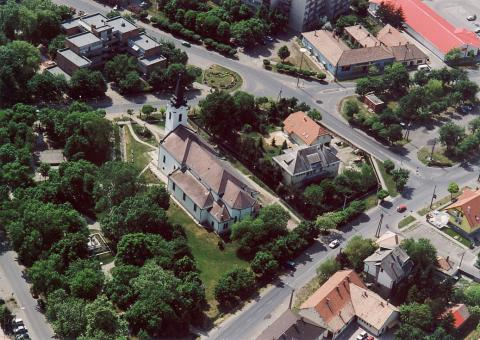
Downtown of Nagykáta

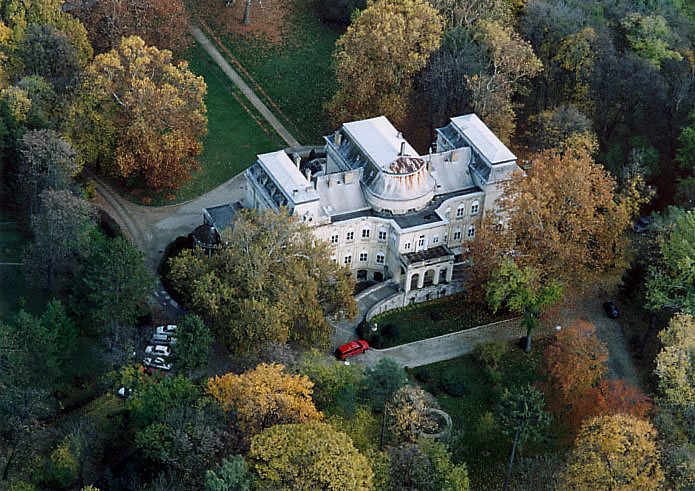
Andrássy Mansion in Tóalmás

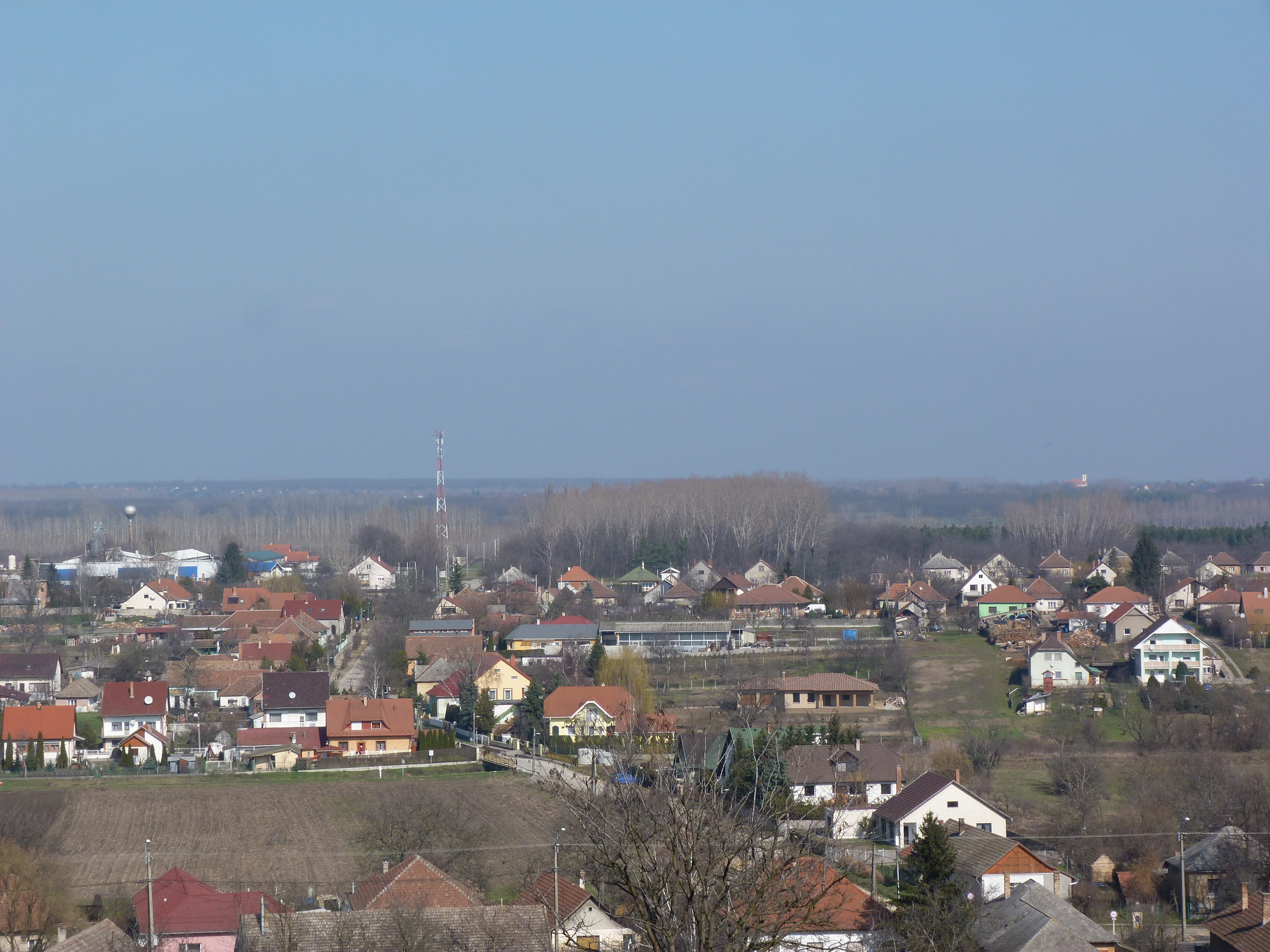
Panorama of Sülysáp

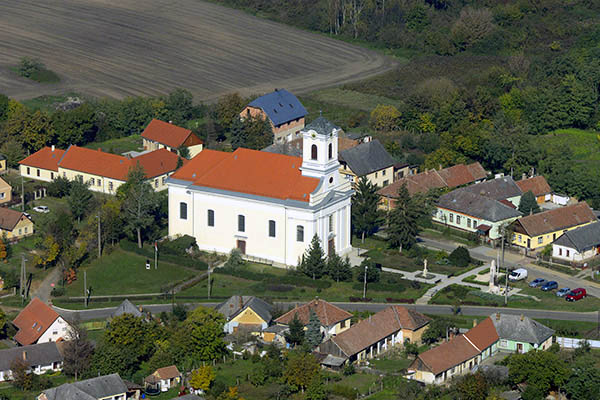
Roman Catholic Church in Kóka

== See also ==
- List of cities and towns in Hungary
