= Main road 31 (Hungary) =

Road in Hungary

Main road 31
- 31-es főút

Route information
- Length: 126 km (78 mi)

Major junctions
- From: Budapest
- M0 near Budapest; 311 in Nagykáta; 32 in Jászberény
- To: 33 in Dormánd

Location
- Country: Hungary
- Counties: Pest, Jász-Nagykun-Szolnok, Heves
- Major cities: Budapest, Maglód, Gyömrő, Sülysáp, Nagykáta, Jászberény, Jászapáti, Heves

Highway system
- Roads in Hungary; Highways; Main roads; Local roads

The Main road 31 is a west–east direction Secondary class main road in the Danube–Tisza Interfluve (Alföld) region of Hungary that connects Budapest to the Main road 33 main roads, facilitating access from the capital city of Hungary to Füzesabony. The road is 126 km long.

The road, as well as all other main roads in Hungary, is managed and maintained by Magyar Közút, state owned company.

== See also ==
- Roads in Hungary
- Transport in Hungary
