= Bénye =

- Coat of arms

- Location of Bénye in Hungary
- Coordinates: 47.35567°N 19.53888°E
- Country: Hungary
- Region: Central Hungary
- County: Pest
- Subregion: Monori
- Rank: Village

Area
  - Total: 16.53 km^{2} (6.38 sq mi)

Population (1 January 2008)
  - Total: 1,265
  - Density: 76.53/km^{2} (198.2/sq mi)
- Time zone: UTC+1 (CET)
  - Summer (DST): UTC+2 (CEST)
- Postal code: 2216
- Area code: +36 29
- KSH code: 25098
- Website: https://www.benye.hu/

Bénye is a village in Pest county, Hungary.

== Geography ==
It lies in the Tápió geographical microregion, in the valley of the Bényei stream. It is only accessible by road; on the main road M4 to Monor, then from there via Gomba on road 3112, and from Nagykáta via multiple settlements on road 3115, then also on road 3112. Its border is also touched by road 3123 in the southeast.

The nearest railway connection is offered by the Monor railway station of the Budapest–Záhony railway line, 9 kilometers away.

== History ==
The first documented mention of it dates back to 1368, when it was owned by the Bényei family. It became extinct during the Ottoman occupation. After the expulsion of the Ottomans, the depopulated village was settled by the Fáy family with Lutherans from Slovakia. The first settler families came from the area of Banská Bystrica.

On the Temple Hill towards Káva, the foundation of the church, which was destroyed around 1600, is still visible today.

The population has grown steadily since the 18th century. The Evangelical Slovak population preserved its native language and culture until the 20th century.

== Politics ==
=== List of mayors ===
- 1990–1994: Károly Racskó (Agrarian Union)
- 1994–1998: Károly Racskó (Agrarian Union)
- 1998–2002: Károly Racskó (Agrarian Union)
- 2002–2006: Károly Racskó (Agrarian Union-MSZP)
- 2006–2010: Károly Racskó (independent)
- 2010–2014: Károly Racskó (independent)
- 2014–2014: Brigitta Hegedüs (independent)
- 2015–2019: Erika Kovács (independent)
- 2019–2024: Erika Kovács (independent)
- 2024– : Erika Kovács (independent)
