= Main road 311 (Hungary) =

Road in Hungary

Main road 311
- 311-es főút

Route information
- Length: 34 km (21 mi)

Major junctions
- From: 31 in Nagykáta
- M4 near Cegléd
- To: 4 in Cegléd

Location
- Country: Hungary
- Counties: Pest
- Major cities: Nagykáta, Tápiószele, Cegléd

Highway system
- Roads in Hungary; Highways; Main roads; Local roads

The Main road 311 is a north-south direction Secondary class main road in the Tápióság (Alföld) region of Hungary, that connects the Main road 31 change to the Main road 4, facilitating access from Nagykáta to Cegléd. The road is 34 km long.

The road, as well as all other main roads in Hungary, is managed and maintained by Magyar Közút, state owned company.

== See also ==
- Roads in Hungary
- Transport in Hungary
