= György Polgár =

Hungarian politician

Member of the National Assembly
- Incumbent
- Assumed office 9 May 2026
- Preceded by: László Földi
- Constituency: Pest 12th

Personal details
- Party: Tisza

György Polgár is a Hungarian politician who was elected member of the National Assembly in 2026 representing the Pest County 12th constituency. He previously worked as an entrepreneur.
