= Gomba =

- Coat of arms

- Location of Gomba in Hungary
- Coordinates: 47°22′14.56″N 19°31′48.94″E
- Country: Hungary
- Region: Central Hungary
- County: Pest
- Subregion: Monori
- Rank: Village

Area
  - Total: 39.76 km^{2} (15.35 sq mi)

Population (1 January 2008)
  - Total: 3,011
  - Density: 75.73/km^{2} (196.1/sq mi)
- Time zone: UTC+1 (CET)
  - Summer (DST): UTC+2 (CEST)
- Postal code: 2217
- Area code: +36 29
- KSH code: 09441
- Website: gomba.hu

Gomba is a village in Pest county, Hungary.

== Geography ==
Gomba is located in the eastern part of Pest County. Budapest is 50 km away, Monor 9 km, Üllő 17 km, Tápióbicske 16.5 km, Káva 6.5 km, and Pánd 10 km away.

== Etymology ==
Its name has been spelled as Gomba, Gombad, and Gombal; it was first mentioned in a document dated 1337.

== History ==
The area has been inhabited since ancient times. According to soil analyses and the earliest surviving maps, the region was covered by a continuous forest for thousands of years. Its first known owner was László Gombai, head of the Gombai family. According to some sources, the family was originally called the Nemze family.

In 1408, Sigismund, Holy Roman Emperor confiscated it from the Gombai family on charges of disloyalty and granted it to Tamás Szentiványi and János Maróthi, the ban of Mačva. Its medieval church was built in 1424. In 1458, its owner, György Bothos, died childless, after which Matthias Corvinus granted it to Sebestyén Rozgonyi, the chief equerry. Still in the 15th century, it became the property of the Kerekegyházi family, who pledged it to the Dávidházi family. Bishop Orbán of Nagylucse redeemed it from the pledge, and then sometime in 1504requested a deed of donation for it from the king.

In the mid-1500s, Gomba came under Ottoman rule, but it did not immediately become depopulated like most of the villages in the area, because its remote location meant that large armies avoided it. In 1553, it had 9 tax-paying households; in 1562, it generated an income of 4,989 akçe.

After the expulsion of the Turks, the Calvinist community built a wooden church, incorporating the main beam from the medieval Catholic church into it. The village was affected by Rákóczi's War of Independence.

In 1904, the Reformed Church had a modern, four-classroom school built in the center of the village. The Catholic school opened in 1920; its building was originally the servants’ quarters next to the Fáy family's manor house. The parsonage was also located here. The schools were nationalized in 1949.

A new school was made in 2004.

== Structure ==
The village's historic center is today's main square, home to the Reformed and Catholic churches. The main factor shaping the street layout is the topography. The village center is also located here. Newer houses have been and continue to be built on the hills. The valleys run northwest-southeast, which is why the main streets follow this direction. As the settlement expanded toward the hills, it increasingly took on the form of a cluster village.

== Politics ==
=== List of mayors ===
- 1990–1994: József Kis (independent)
- 1994–1998: József Kis (independent)
- 1998–2002: József Kis (independent)
- 2002–2006: József Kis (independent)
- 2006–2010: Vilmos Lehota (independent)
- 2010–2014: Vilmos Lehota (independent)
- 2014–2019: Vilmos Lehota (independent)
- 2019–2024: Vilmos Lehota (independent)
- 2024– : Vilmos Lehota (independent)

== Economy ==
The main economic sector has traditionally been agriculture, particularly crop farming. In the 18th and 19th centuries, most of the land was arable, cultivated using a three-field rotation system. In addition to the main arable crops (wheat, rye, millet, and barley), winemaking was significant—the vineyards were planted on the Tetei Hills.

In animal husbandry, pig and sheep farming were the primary activities, but beekeeping was also common.

The importance of arable crop production declined only somewhat in the 1970s and 1980s, when forests and orchards (mainly apricots and plums) were planted on the outskirts of the village. Meanwhile, in arable farming, corn became the main crop alongside wheat, and in animal husbandry, the role of poultry farming increased.

The village's ability to retain its population declined significantly with the decline in the economic importance of agriculture: according to 2007 data, 80% of the working population commutes to Budapest for work. There are no direct routes to Budapest; passengers must transfer in Monor. From Gomba, Volánbusz buses take passengers to Monor, where a transfer at the bus station to another bus line provides access to both other rural settlements and Budapest. From the Monor train station, it is possible to reach Budapest within 30 minutes via the commuter trains. With the opening of the new M4 motorway, the capital is now also accessible by car in a short amount of time.
