= Pánd =

- Coat of arms

- Location of Pánd in Hungary
- Coordinates: 47.35036°N 19.63336°E
- Country: Hungary
- Region: Central Hungary
- County: Pest
- Subregion: Nagykátai
- Rank: Village

Area
  - Total: 22.21 km^{2} (8.58 sq mi)

Population (1 January 2008)
  - Total: 2,083
  - Density: 93.79/km^{2} (242.9/sq mi)
- Time zone: UTC+1 (CET)
  - Summer (DST): UTC+2 (CEST)
- Postal code: 2214
- Area code: +36 29
- KSH code: 22248
- Website: www.pand.hu

Pánd is a village in Pest county, Hungary.

== Location ==
Pánd is located between the towns of Káva and Tápióbicske along the minor road connecting Nagykáta and Monor. It is almost entirely located in the valleys of Őr Hill and Dobos Hill. A smaller stream crosses the southern part of the settlement that empties into the river Tápió which is part of the Danube's drainage basin.
