= Nyáregyháza =

- Village
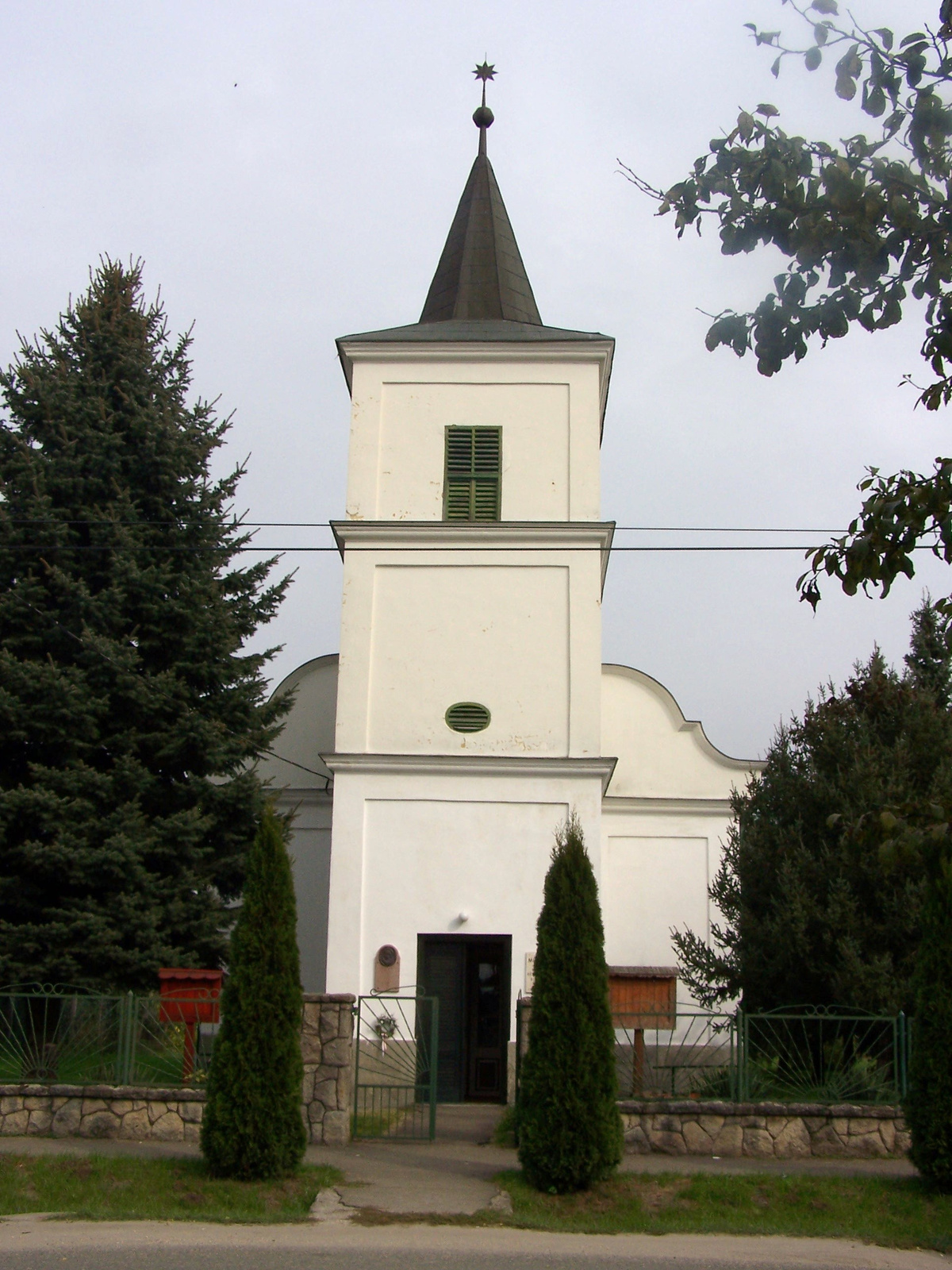

- Flag Coat of arms

- Location of Nyáregyháza
- Coordinates: 47.26156°N 19.50895°E
- Country: Hungary
- Region: Central Hungary
- County: Pest
- District: Monor

Area
  - Total: 32 km^{2} (12 sq mi)

Population (1 January 2025)
  - Total: 3,840
  - Density: 120/km^{2} (310/sq mi)
- Time zone: UTC+1 (CET)
  - Summer (DST): UTC+2 (CEST)
- Postal code: 2723
- Area code: (+36) 29
- KSH code: 23038
- Website: www.nyaregyhaza.hu

Nyáregyháza is a village in Pest county, Hungary.
