= The Gay Hussars =

Operetta composed by Imre Kálmán

See also The Gay Hussar restaurant, and Tatárjárás (disambiguation)

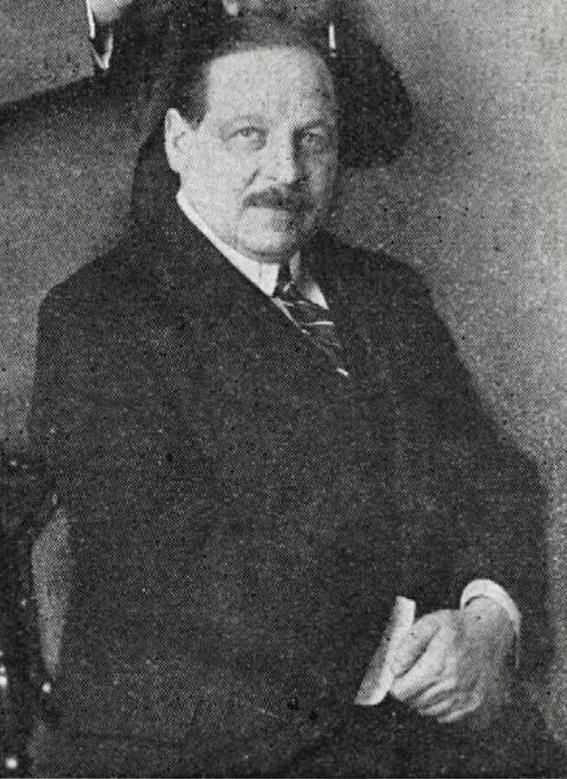
Emmerich Kálmán

The Gay Hussars is an operetta in three acts composed by Emmerich Kálmán. The piece was Kalman's first operetta and a hit throughout Europe and America. The first version, in Hungarian, Tatárjárás, with libretto by Karl von Bakonyi and Andor Gábor, premiered at the Vígszinház in Budapest on 22 February 1908. The German version, Ein Herbstmanöver, with libretto by K. von Bakonyi and Robert Bodanzky, premiered in Vienna on 22 January 1909. It was so popular there that it prompted Kalman to move to Vienna.

== English adaptations ==
Its New York premiere, as The Gay Hussars, adapted by Maurice Brown Kirby with lyrics by Grant Stewart, was at the Knickerbocker Theatre on 29 July 1909 with W. H. Denny. Another English adaptation played in London as Autumn Manoeuvres, opening in 1912 at the Adelphi Theatre with Robert Evett. The piece then toured in Britain.

== Roles ==
Role	Voice type	Premiere Cast, 22 February 1908 (Conductor: - )
Baroness Risa	soprano	
Leutnant Elekes	tenor	
Oberleutnant von Lörenthy	tenor	
Rittmeister von Emmerich	tenor	
Treszka	soprano	

== Selected recordings ==
A version of Autumn Manoeuvers was recorded in 2003 by Ohio Light Opera.
