= Úri =

Coordinates: 47°24′59″N 19°31′04″E

- Coat of arms

- Country: Hungary
- Region: Central Hungary
- County: Pest
- District: Nagykáta

Úri is a village in Nagykáta District of Pest County in Hungary.
