= Tápiógyörgye =

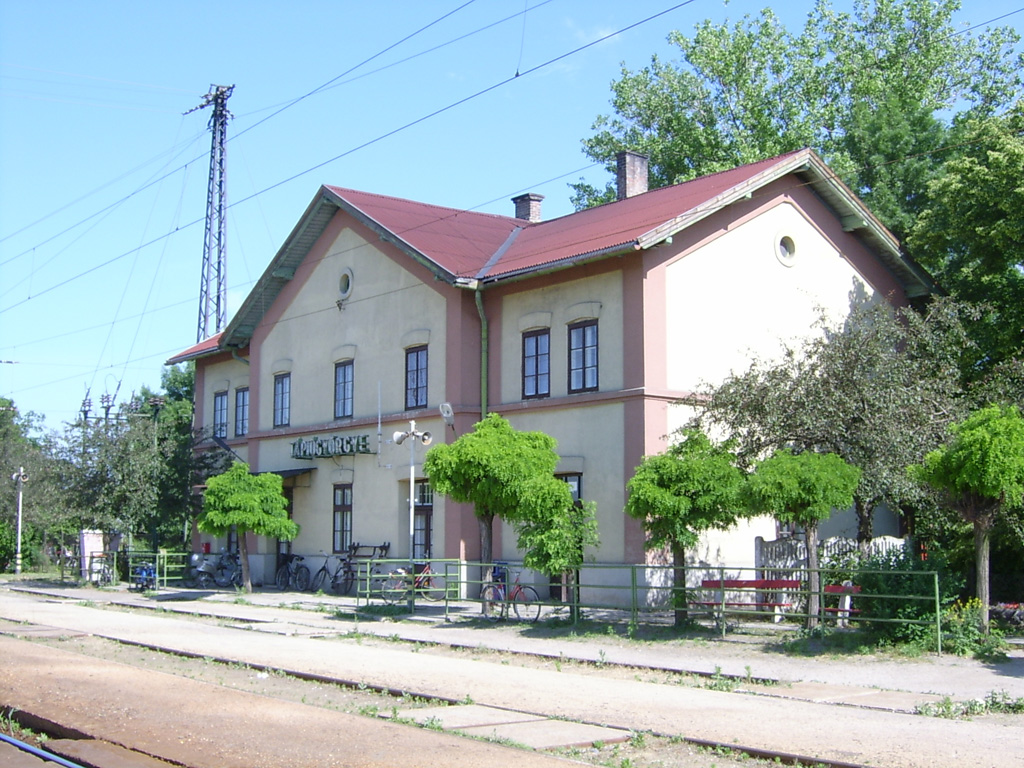
- Train station

- Flag Coat of arms

- Location of Tápiógyörgye in Hungary
- Coordinates: 47°20′1.68″N 19°57′14.87″E
- Country: Hungary
- Region: Central Hungary
- County: Pest
- District: Nagykáta
- Rank: Village

Area
  - Total: 53.31 km^{2} (20.58 sq mi)

Population (1 January 2008)
  - Total: 3,780
  - Density: 70.9/km^{2} (184/sq mi)
- Time zone: UTC+1 (CET)
  - Summer (DST): UTC+2 (CEST)
- Postal code: 2767
- Area code: +36 53
- KSH code: 17303
- Website: www.Tapiogyorgye.hu

Tápiógyörgye is a village in Pest county, Hungary.
