= Tatárjárás (disambiguation) =

Tatárjárás is a Hungarian word, meaning literally "Passing of the Tatars".

It may refer to:

- The Mongol invasion of Hungary in 1241-42 (see Mongol invasion of Europe).
- An operetta by Emmerich Kálmán, titled in English "The Gay Hussars" or "Autumn Manoeuvres".
- Tartar Invasion, a 1917 Hungarian film
