= Farmos =

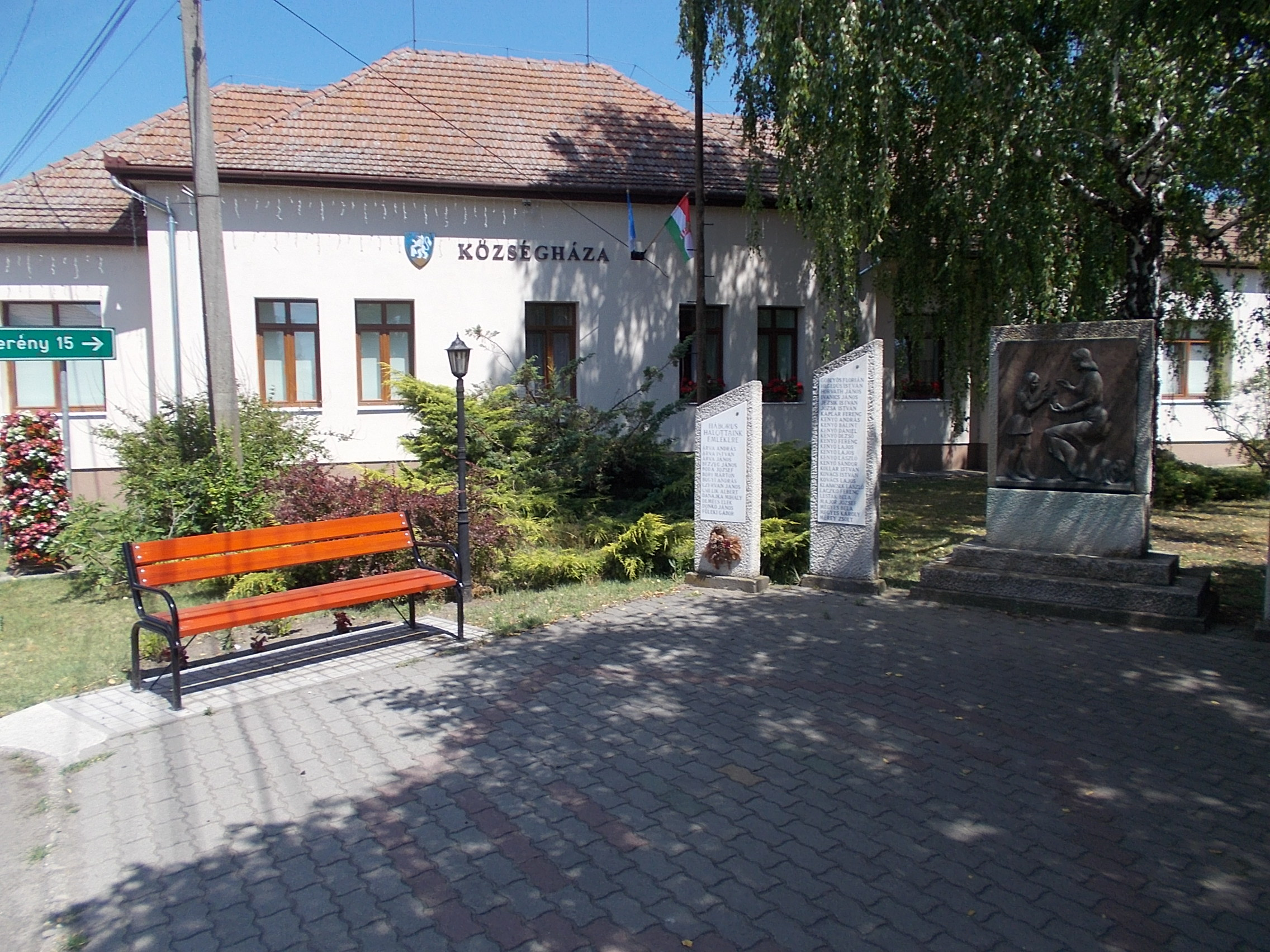
- Village hall

- Coat of arms

- Location of Farmos in Hungary
- Coordinates: 47.35991°N 19.84809°E
- Country: Hungary
- Region: Central Hungary
- County: Pest
- Subregion: District of Nagykáta
- Rank: Village

Area
  - Total: 40.12 km^{2} (15.49 sq mi)

Population (January 1, 2015)
  - Total: 3,427
  - Density: 85.42/km^{2} (221.2/sq mi)
- Time zone: UTC+1 (CET)
  - Summer (DST): UTC+2 (CEST)
- Postal code: 2765
- Area code: +36 53
- KSH code: 09122
- Website: www.farmos.hu

Farmos is a village in the district of Nagykáta (also a nearby town), in the middle of Pest county, and in the agglomeration of Budapest in Hungary. Farmos can be reached via Secondary Main Road 311 from Nagykáta, Tápiószele and Secondary Main Road 31 from Jászberény. The village has a railway station, which is connected to the Budapest-Nagykáta-Szolnok railway line.

== History ==
Farmos was first mentioned officially in a document in 1420, but its history dates back to the ancient times, some artifacts found around the settlement are claimed to be from the times prior the Hungarian conquest of the Carpathian Basin.

The village was destroyed among many other Hungarian settlements during the Tatárjárás (Mongol invasion of Europe). The first lord to rule over Farmos and in the south and central part of Hungary was Máté Csák from 1311, then after his death the Káta family clan gained authority.

Before the beginning of the Turkish invasion, the village was property of the Mirliva family. In the seventeenth century, Farmos was damaged again, but stayed relevant among totally perished villages. In around 1700, several families from Zólyom County (Now part of Slovakia) were immigrated to the village, who had been hungarianized within a few decades. According to the county record of 1727, the recent area of the village was owned by - among others - Ádám Bene, Boldizsár Kozma, Count and Antal Grassalkovich. In the nineteenth century it was owned by the Ivánka-Kass-Matolcsy and Vízy families.

== Sights ==
From the railway station, the centre of the village can be reached via Rákóczi Street. The centre is in the meeting-point of Rákóczi, Szelei (Secondary main road 311) and Jászberényi streets (S. Main Road 31). At the center one can find the Town Hall, and the Monument of Heroes in its garden. From Szelei street, the Water Tower can be reached. On a little sloping way, one can soon reach the late Matolcsy mansion. Now the Museum of Waterside Flora and Fauna can be found there. The Roman Catholic Church can be reached from the centre via Zrínyi street. Going towards Rákóczi street, after a few hundred meters starts the local educational hiking path through the meadows, which demonstrates the natural beauty of flowers and plants growing on 'lösz' terrain (yellow soil) and the flora and fauna of the floodplains habitat all around Farmos.

Next to Secondary Main Road 311, a local event called Békamentés is taking place every year around April 1, which is about saving frogs from jumping under cars, and helping them cross the main road in safety. A lot of people visit the village in order to take part in this event.

Every year, white storks come back to the village to lay eggs, and many other endangered bird species can be found here. This village has the most crane nests in Europe.
