= Gyömrő =

- Town
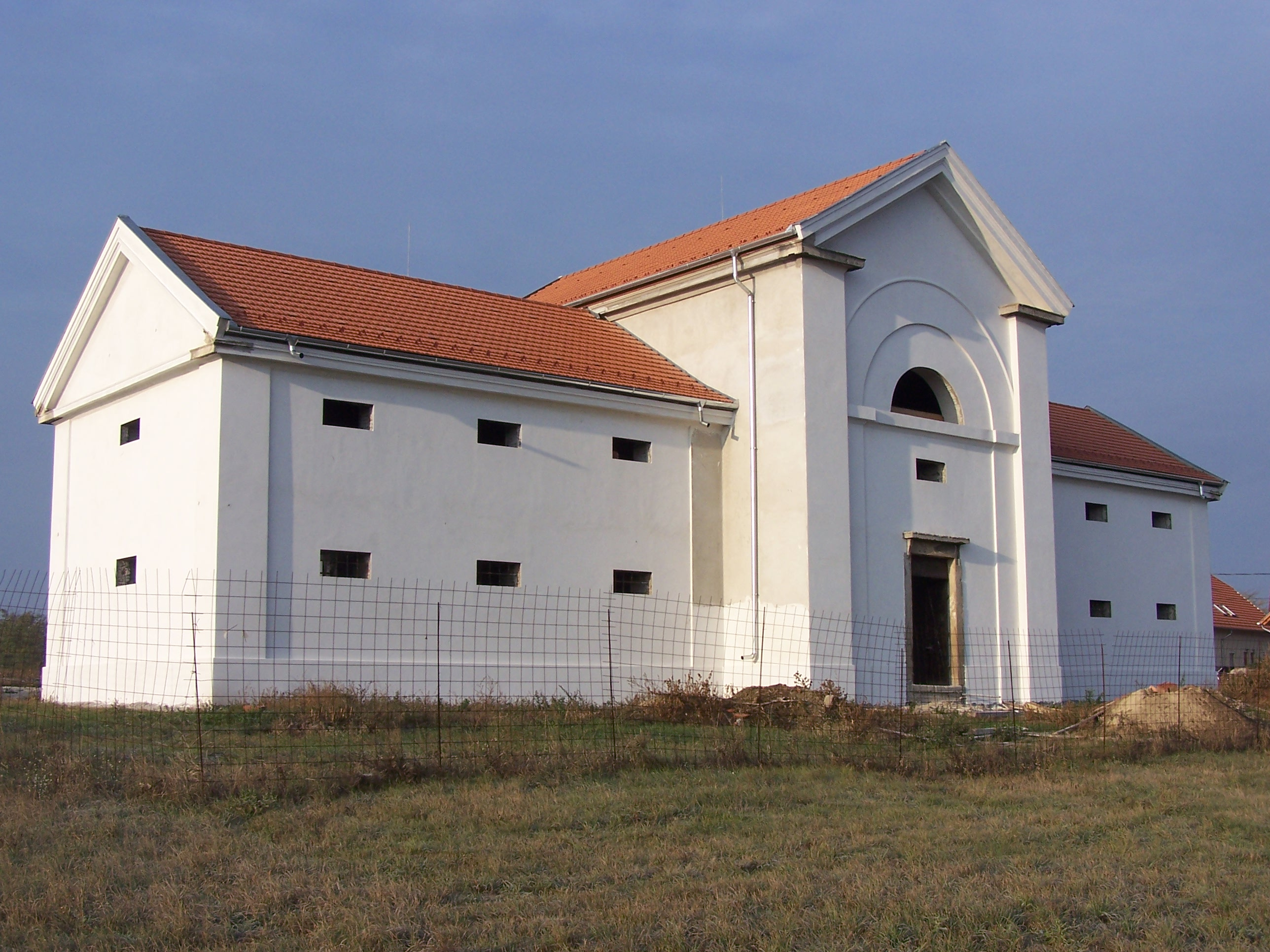
- Manorial Granary

- Flag Coat of arms

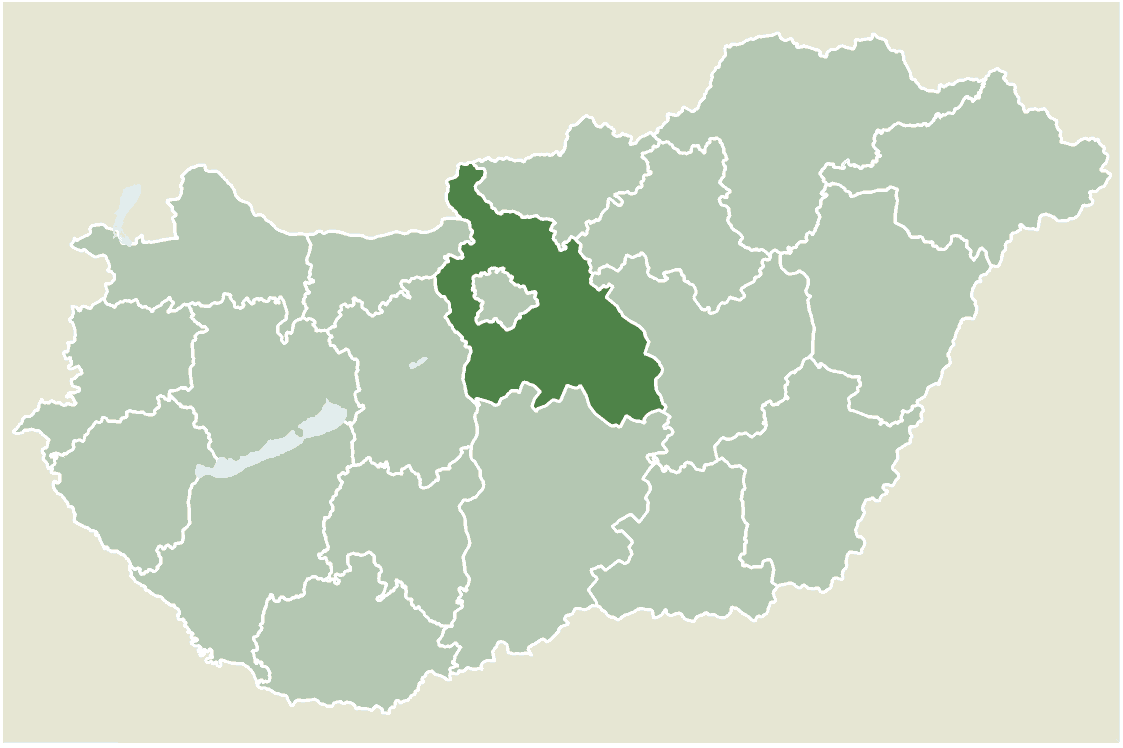
- Location of Pest county in Hungary

- Location of Gyömrő
- Coordinates: 47.42495°N 19.39774°E
- Country: Hungary
- County: Pest
- District: Monor

Area
  - Total: 26.51 km^{2} (10.24 sq mi)

Population (2008)
  - Total: 15,290
  - Density: 537.53/km^{2} (1,392.2/sq mi)
- Time zone: UTC+1 (CET)
  - Summer (DST): UTC+2 (CEST)
- Postal code: 2230
- Area code: (+36) 29
- Website: www.gyomro.hu

Gyömrő is a town in Pest county, Budapest metropolitan area, Hungary. The City of Gyömrő is situated in the center of the hilly region of Monor, in the outskirt of the capital city, Budapest. The whole territory of Gyömrő is 26,51 km^{2}, its internal area is 6.45 km^{2}. The number of inhabitants is about 15,290 (in 2008).

== Geography ==
Gyömrő is a garden city and is situated 30 kilometers away from the center of Budapest, and 7 kilometres away from the boundary of the Capital and from Ferihegy Airport. The center location of the Gyömrő from the aspect of traffic is outstanding, mainly because the connecting-roads and railway lines of the country, which bond North-, East- and South-Hungary, cross the city. West-Hungary can be reached through Budapest from the settlement. Gyömrő can be easily reached through the number 4 main-road, the M4 and M5 motorways, the M0 motor road and it is important that the Budapest-Ferihegy Airport is not far away, it takes only 15–20 minutes to get there.

== History ==
The first written record of the settlement dates to 1274. In the 15th century it belonged to the estates of the Queen and later became a grace and favour land for loyal noblemen. From the end of the 18th century the Count Teleki family became the main proprietors of the village; they had a significant role in its development over an extended period. The original centre of the settlement grew up next to their estate. During the second half of the 19th century the village centre was moved to the other end of the settlement, where the construction of several buildings, including the town hall, police station and school, signify this development at the turn of the 20th century. Gyömrő was granted city status in 2001.

== Sights ==
Teleki Castle

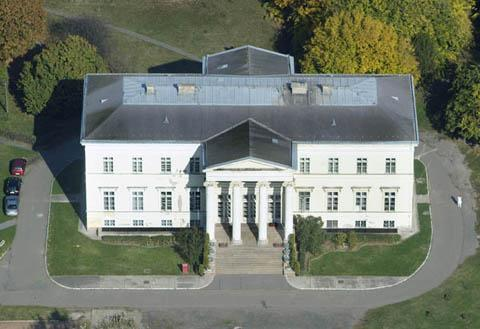
Teleki Castle

Gyömrő became part of Count Teleki's estate at the end of the 18th century. In 1774 Count József Teleki had a castle built, which burnt down in 1835. The Teleki library was saved and taken to Pest. On the base of the former castle Count Sámuel Teleki had the new neo-classicist castle constructed according to the plans of architect József Hild. The castle remained almost undamaged, however the furniture was taken away during World War II. Trees and bushes decorate the park around the castle. Since 1968 a primary school and a dormitory are operating in the castle, which are maintained by the Local Government of Pest County. Near the great castle, two other smaller castles were also built around the 1830s. It serves as a children's home. At the turn of the 19th and 20th centuries the mansion was owned by count Tibor Teleki, the keeper of the crown, who placed his art collection in this residence. The most famous pieces of his collection included Transylvanian chancellor, Mihály Teleki's saddle, and a case for keeping money, which Mihály Teleki got from the French king, Louis XIV. A Rákóczi's banner and a nobleman's library of 4,000 volumes were also preserved here.

Natural Lake – Spa

In 1920 the spouting water from the earth formed this lake in the centre of the settlement. It is suitable for bathing and water-sports. The beach was renovated and cleaned at the beginning of the 1990s.

Roman Catholic Church of Saint John of Nepomuk

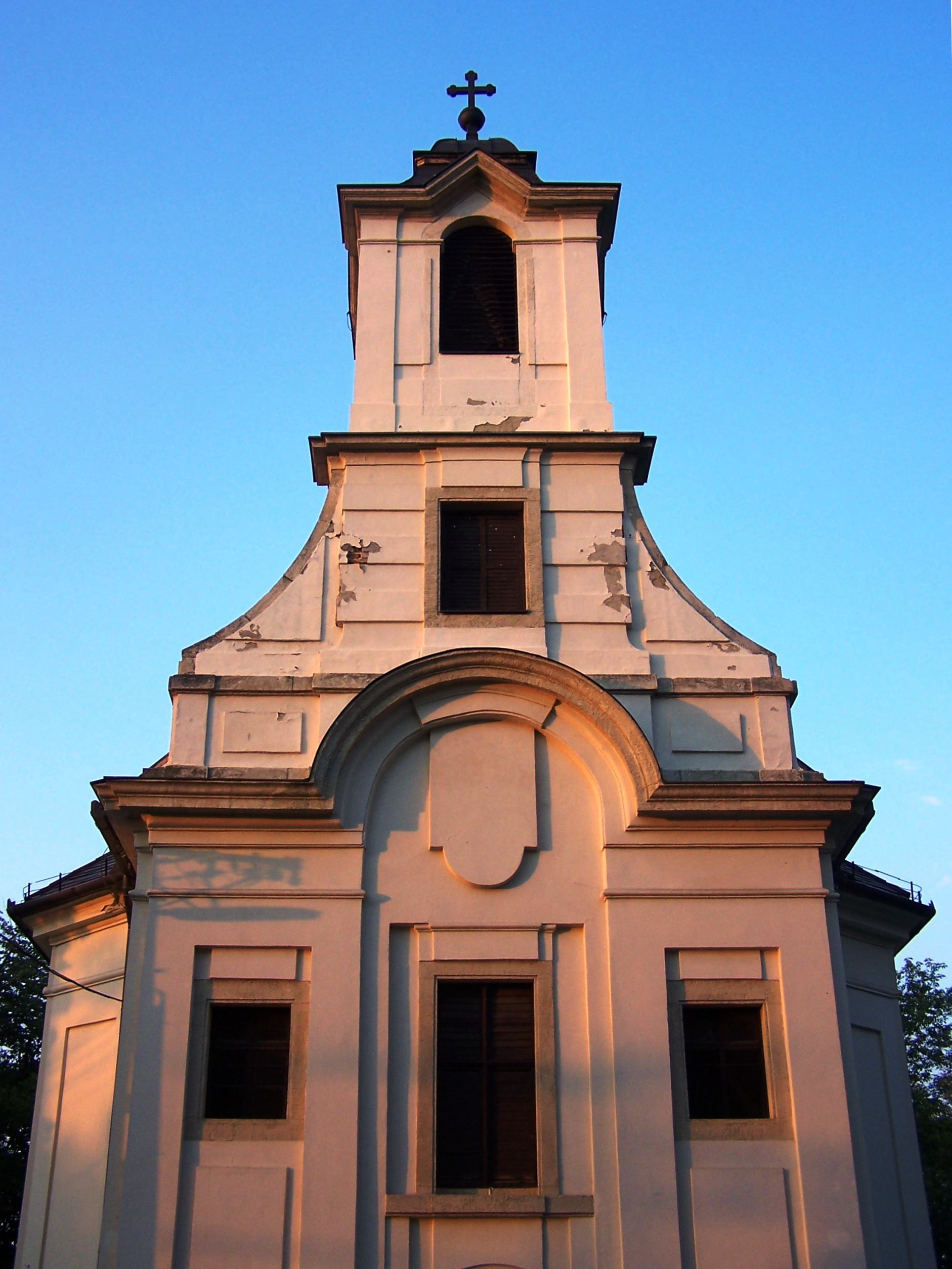
The Roman Catholic Church of Gyömrő

The church was constructed in 1777, and was renovated in 2002. The designing architect and builder was Jajab Fellner. It was built in Copf style, the benches are baroque works, and the relic holders originate from 1738.

Calvinist Church

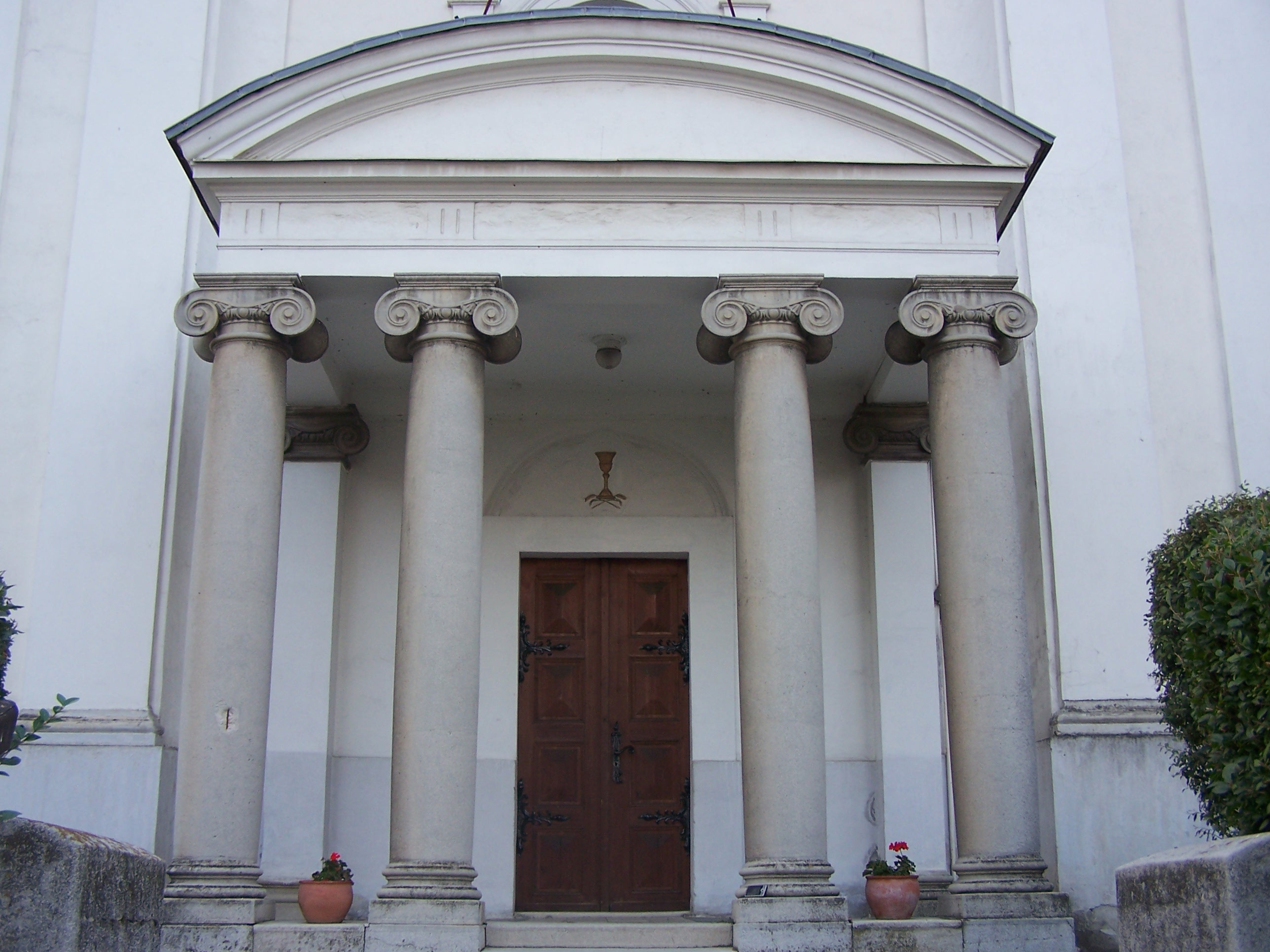
The entrance of the Calvinist Church of Gyömrő

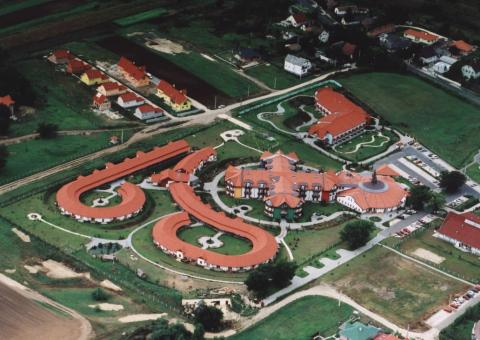
Aerial photography of Gyömrő

This church was rebuilt in 1819–23, as the successor of the former one standing here from the mid 16th century. The church obtained its current form in 1928. One of its attractions is the internal relief, the "Grieving Genius" made from Carrarra marble the work of Antonio Canova, Italian neo-classicist sculptor. Among the devotional objects of the church the Coconut-chalice is worth mentioning, which was a gift from the Teleki family. The Italian sculptor Antonio Canova created the Classicist-style Mournful Genius. The relief, carved out of white marble, is located in the Reformed church. At the centre of the relief a genius sits mournfully, leaning on his right arm next to the ash-urn. He is wreathed with laurels and is holding a torch. On the two sides of the relief there is a sword wreathed with laurel and a palm branch. This work of art was placed on the wall of the Reformed church in 1829.

Regional Village House

The first village museum of the county was established in 1954, under the name of II. Ferenc Rákóczi Village Museum. The building of the Country House with verenda was constructed in 1840. The room, kitchen and pantry of the former dwelling-house were furnished in a traditional way. Besides the ethnographic objects the museum collects documents of local history, as well.

Ferenc II Rákóczi Monument

On the road which is leading out to Üllő can be seen the Ferenc II Rákóczi (Francis II Rákóczi) Monument where he gave his famous Gyömrő speech. When planning a change in his military campaign in Transdanubia, prior to taking his army up into northern Hungary (now Slovakia) Ferenc Rákóczi II. gave a speech to his people outlining his plans (3 July 1705).

"I don't want an empire. I am not asking for treasures; all I ask for is the courage one expects from a true Hungarian. With this firmly in mind I will truly be able to live and die amongst you!"

Other attractions

- the fishing-lake in the centre of the town (3 ha)
- the nature reserves around the lakes
- tradition preserving local programs, for instance the annually organized Rákoczi Days
- the exhibitions of Gyömrő's artists (Gyömrő is the home of several painters, sculptors, poets and musicians with a national reputation)
- restaurants, motels
- stone-bridge from the Roman age

The educational, cultural, sport, health-care, financial, economic, administration and judiciary institutions, the workplaces of the industrial companies, the restaurants and motels, the artistic and natural values further enhance the natural values of the town. Colourful school-life is a characteristic of the town, as well as the cultural and tradition preserving activities. 12 civil organisations operate in Gyömrő, which have a significant role in determining the cultural, traditional and sport life of the town.

== Twin towns – sister cities ==
Gyömrő is twinned with:

- Regéc, Hungary
- Štvrtok na Ostrove, Slovakia

== Controversy ==
In 2011 the city council of Gyömrö decided to change the name of Szabadság tér (Freedom square) to Horthy tér. The proposal for the name change originated from the representative of the Jobbik party, the Hungarian radical nationalist party. The decision of the city council to adopt the name of Horthy for the square was widely criticised in Hungary because of Horthy's connections with Nazi Germany and his responsibility for the discrimination and persecution of in particular Hungarian Jews and Roma On January 6, 2012, a referendum was organised about the city council's decision. However, the required minimum turn-out was not met and therefore the outcome was not considered valid. 1778 citizens of Gyömrö voted against the name change, while 484 citizens voted for it.
