= László Földi (politician) =

Hungarian politician

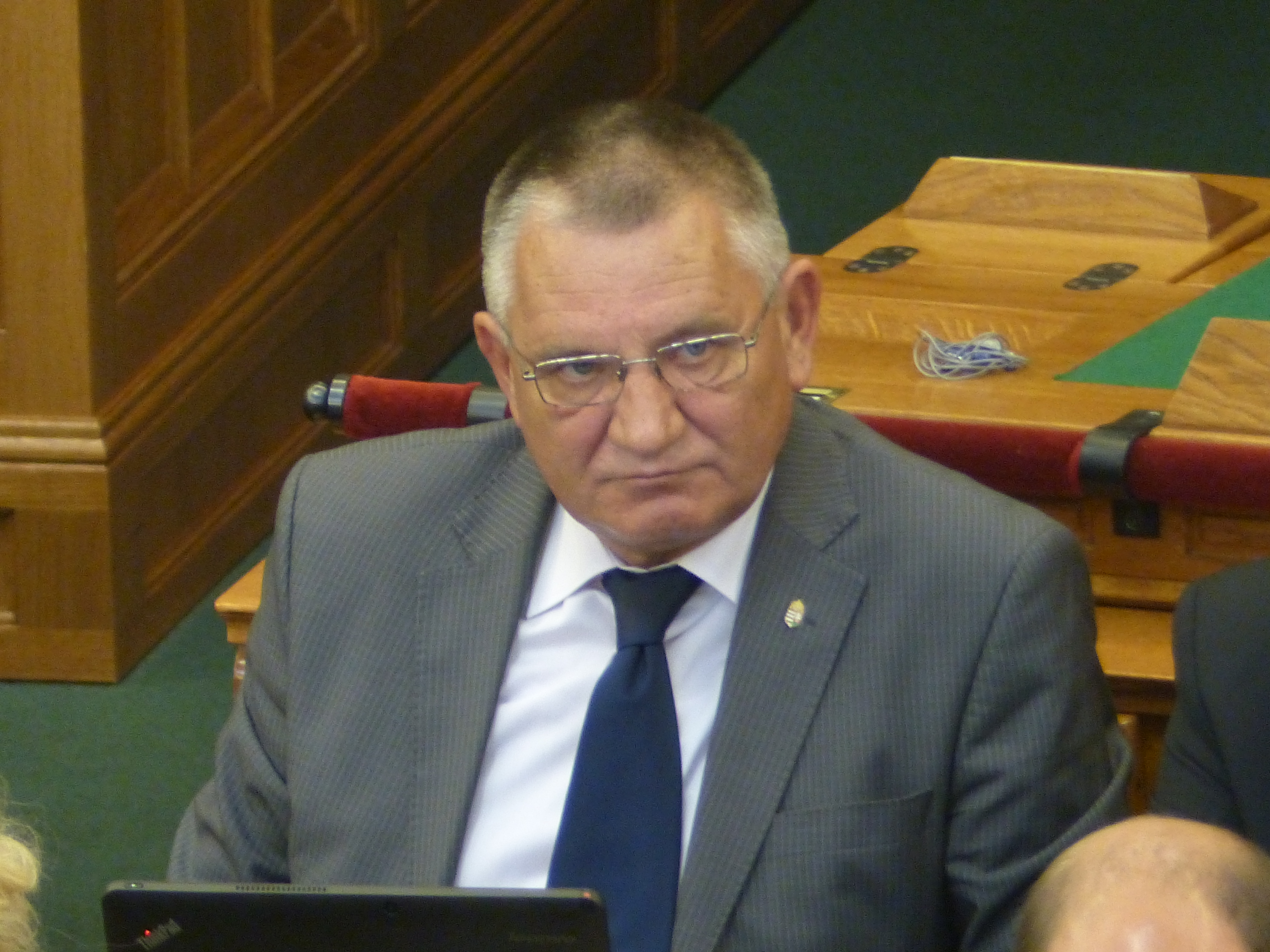

Member of the National Assembly
- Incumbent
- Assumed office 14 May 2010

Personal details
- Born: 7 September 1952 (age 73) Abony, Hungary
- Party: Fidesz, KDNP
- Spouse: Lászlóné Földi
- Children: 4
- Profession: politician

László Földi (born 7 September 1952) is a Hungarian politician, who served as the mayor of Cegléd between 2006 and 2014. He is a member of the National Assembly (MP) for Cegléd (Pest County Constituency XV then XII) since 2010. He was appointed one of the recorders of the parliament in May 2014.

== Personal life ==
He is married. His wife is Lászlóné Földi. They have four children.
