= Tápióbicske =

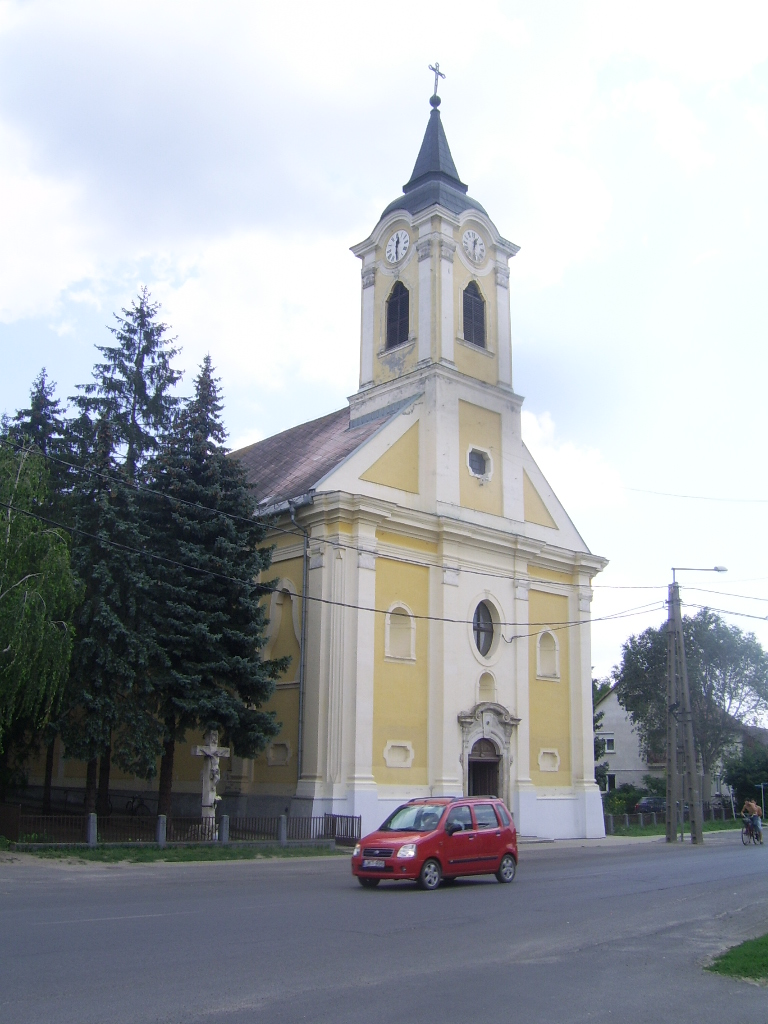
- Church of the Immaculate Conception

- Flag Coat of arms

- Location of Tápióbicske in Hungary
- Coordinates: 47°21′43.96″N 19°41′12.37″E
- Country: Hungary
- Region: Central Hungary
- County: Pest
- District: Nagykáta
- Rank: Village

Government
  - Mayor: Sándor Kanyó

Area
  - Total: 48.48 km^{2} (18.72 sq mi)

Population (1 January 2008)
  - Total: 3,529
  - Density: 72.79/km^{2} (188.5/sq mi)
- Time zone: UTC+1 (CET)
  - Summer (DST): UTC+2 (CEST)
- Postal code: 2764
- Area code: +36 29
- KSH code: 15015
- Website: www.tapiobicske.hu

Tápióbicske is a village in Pest county, Hungary.

The village was a site of the Battle of Tápióbicske in 1849.
