= Káva =

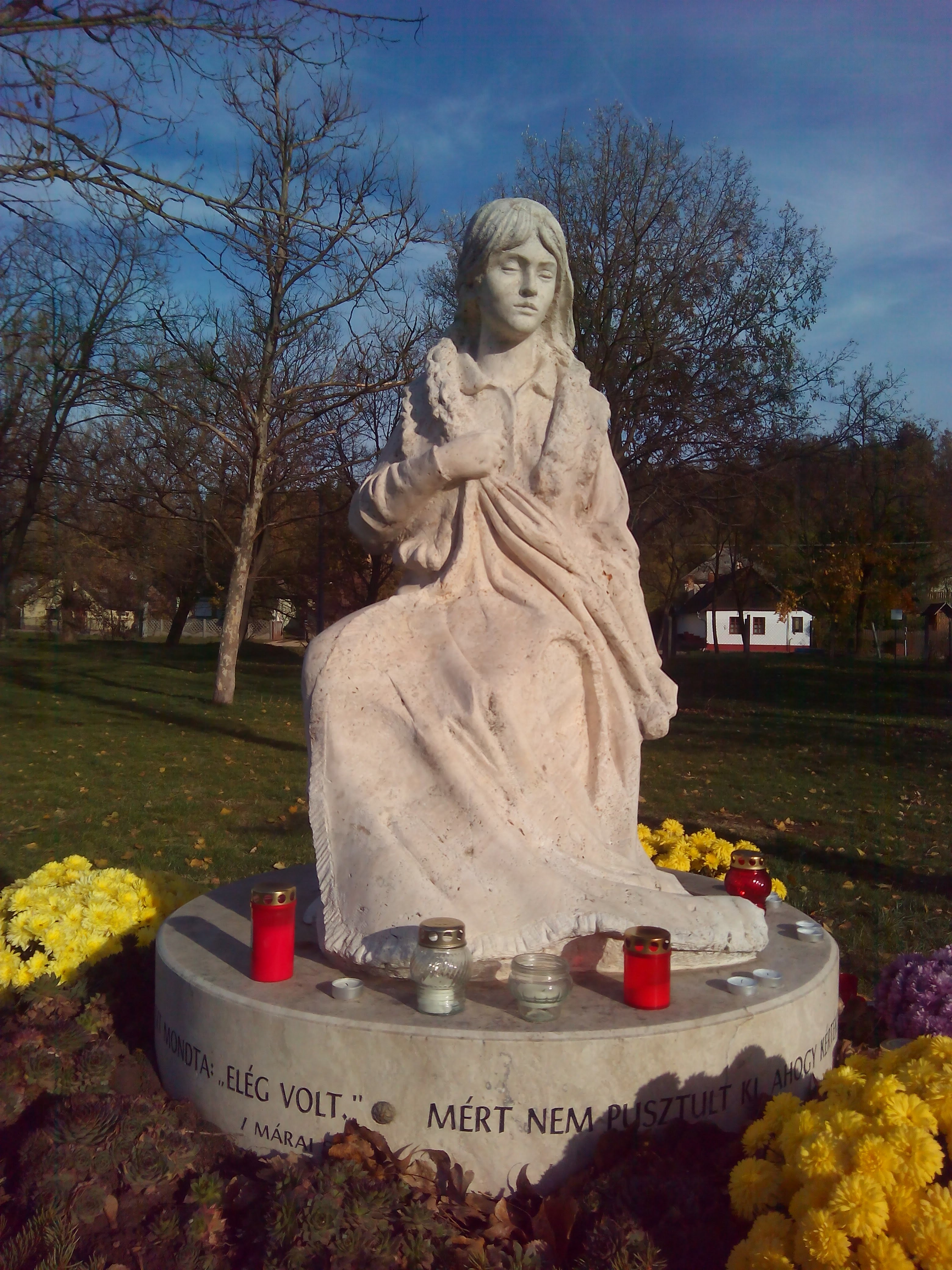

- Coat of arms

- Location of Káva in Hungary
- Coordinates: 47.35551°N 19.58801°E
- Country: Hungary
- Region: Central Hungary
- County: Pest
- Subregion: Monori
- Rank: Village

Area
  - Total: 11.31 km^{2} (4.37 sq mi)

Population (1 January 2008)
  - Total: 623
  - Density: 55.1/km^{2} (143/sq mi)
- Time zone: UTC+1 (CET)
  - Summer (DST): UTC+2 (CEST)
- Postal code: 2215
- Area code: +36 29
- KSH code: 27827

Káva is a village in Monor District, Pest county, Hungary.
