= Tápióság =

- Coat of arms

- Location of Tápióság in Hungary
- Coordinates: 47°24′12.74″N 19°37′23.02″E
- Country: Hungary
- Region: Central Hungary
- County: Pest
- Subregion: Nagykátai
- Rank: Village

Area
  - Total: 33.54 km^{2} (12.95 sq mi)

Population (1 January 2008)
  - Total: 2,727
  - Density: 81.31/km^{2} (210.6/sq mi)
- Time zone: UTC+1 (CET)
  - Summer (DST): UTC+2 (CEST)
- Postal code: 2253
- Area code: +36 29
- KSH code: 09405
- Website: www.tapiosag.hu

Tápióság is a village in Pest county, Hungary.
