= Monor =

- Town
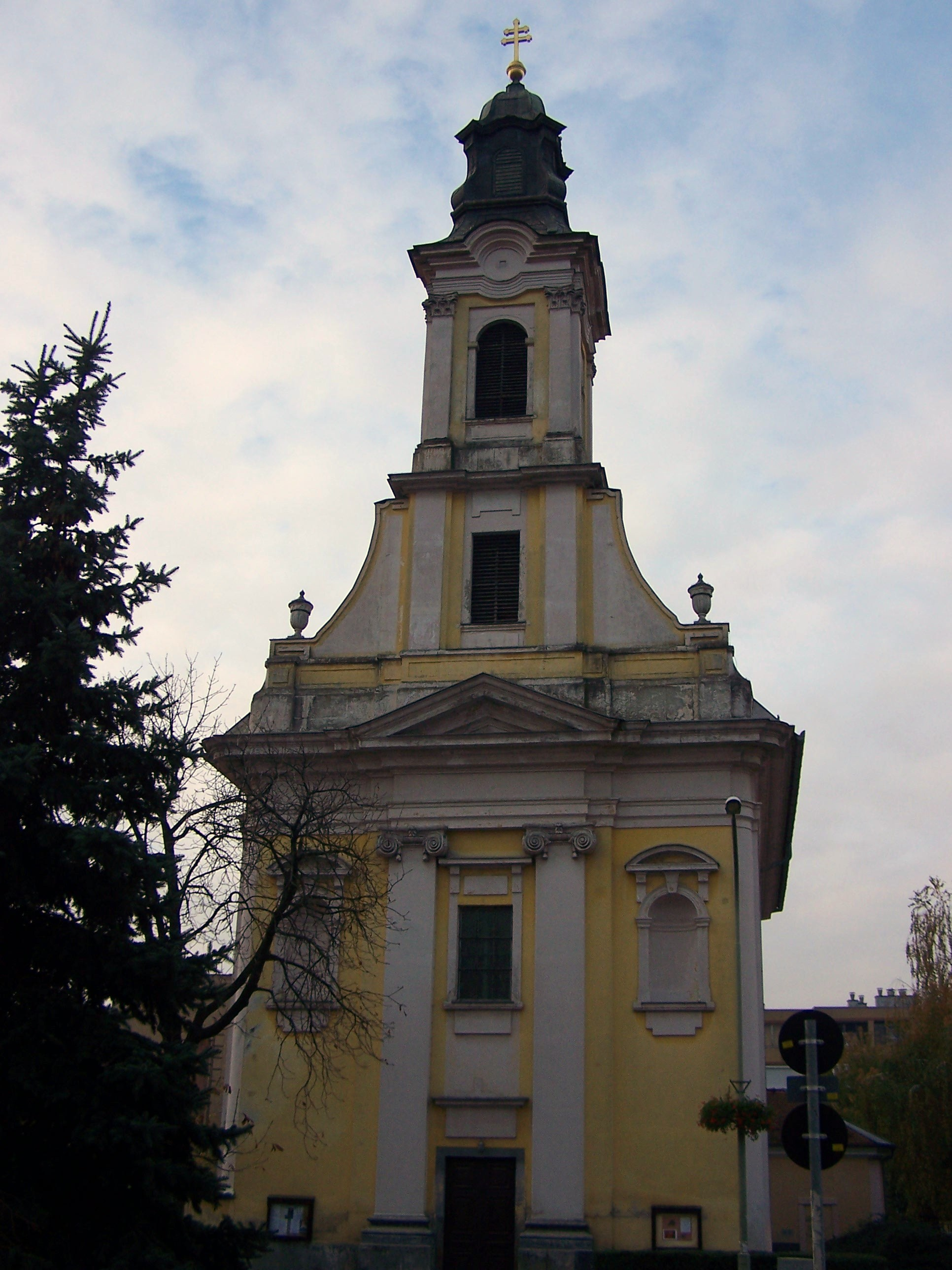
- The Roman Catholic Church of Monor

- Flag Coat of arms

- Location of Monor in Hungary
- Coordinates: 47.34960°N 19.43833°E
- Country: Hungary
- Region: Central Hungary
- County: Pest

Area
  - Total: 61.86 km^{2} (23.88 sq mi)

Population (2004)
  - Total: 21,421
  - Density: 346.3/km^{2} (896.9/sq mi)
- Time zone: UTC+1 (CET)
  - Summer (DST): UTC+2 (CEST)
- Postal code: 2200
- Area code: +36 29
- Website: http://www.monor.hu

Monor is a town in Pest county, Hungary. It is situated immediately southeast of Üllő municipality and Ferenc Liszt International Airport - southeast of Budapest. Monor has a railway station, light industry, and both a Roman Catholic and a Reformed church. Balassi Bálint utcai sporttelep is the local football arena.
