= Nagykáta =

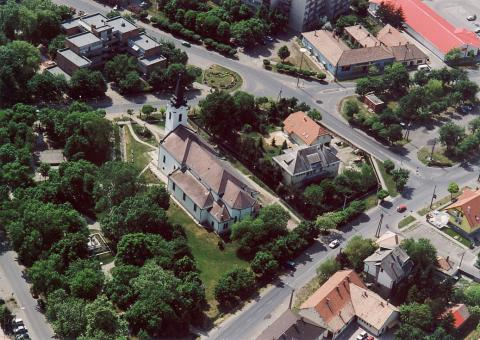
- Aerial view of the Church of Saint George

- Flag Coat of arms

- Location of Nagykáta in Hungary
- Coordinates: 47.41201°N 19.73963°E
- Country: Hungary
- Region: Central Hungary
- County: Pest
- Rank: City

Government
  - Mayor: Dorner Gábor

Area
  - Total: 81.61 km^{2} (31.51 sq mi)

Population (1 January 2009)
  - Total: 12,739
  - Density: 156.1/km^{2} (404.3/sq mi)
- Time zone: UTC+1 (CET)
  - Summer (DST): UTC+2 (CEST)
- Postal code: 2760
- Area code: +36 29
- KSH code: 13435
- Website: http://www.nagykata.hu

Nagykáta is a town in Pest County, Hungary, about 60 kilometres (40 mi) from Budapest.

== Connections ==
Express trains take 47 minutes to Budapest Keleti railway station from Nagykáta and stopping trains about 65 minutes.

== History ==
The history of Nagykáta dates back to the 12th century, when the Pest county branch of the Káta family settled in the region.

On the outskirts of Nagykáta, at a place called Kenderhalom, can be found the remains of a village which was the predecessor of Nagykáta at the time of the Árpád dynasty.

The Regestrum of Várad mentions the name of the village as Hungarian: Káta in 1221. In the 15th and 16th centuries the name of Nagykáta appears as Csekekáta in several documents. The name Nagykáta appears first at the beginning of the 17th century.

Although the village was destroyed several times under the Turkish occupation of Hungary, it was always revived. The Káthay family were unable keep up with so many setbacks and could not survive the struggle. Heirless Ferenc Káthay had to sell his remaining estates – even Csekekáta – to Miklós Keglevich in 1663.

When Buda was reoccupied Nagykáta was also marked for destruction, and it did not appear in the official registers until 1665, but from 1696 the village had an ordained priest again, and the registration of births, marriages death began.

In November 2020, the city's local assembly adopted a resolution banning the "spread and promotion of LGBTQ propaganda in any institution maintained by the municipality".

== Twin towns – sister cities ==
Nagykáta is twinned with:

- Alfonsine, Italy
- Negotino, North Macedonia
- Ozun, Romania

== Gallery ==
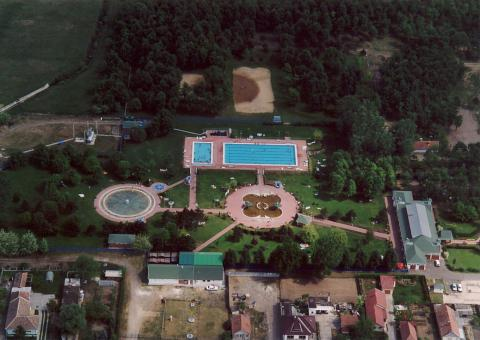

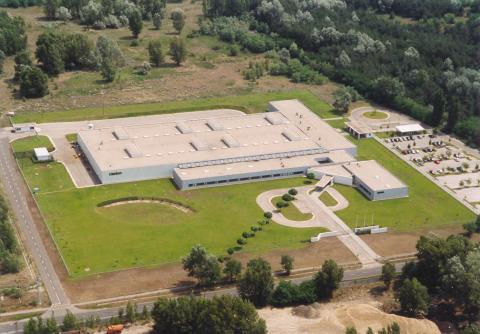
