= Pest County 13th constituency =

Electoral constituency in Hungary (2026–)

- single member district constituency for the National Assembly
- Location of Pest county 13 within Pest county

- Location of Pest county within Hungary
- County: Pest County
- Electorate: 69,942 (2026)
- Major settlements: Dabas

Current constituency
- Created: 2024
- Party: Tisza Party
- Member: Máté Hende

The Pest County 13th parliamentary constituency is one of the 106 constituencies into which the territory of Hungary is divided by Act LXXIX of 2024, and in which voters can elect one member of the National Assembly. The standard abbreviation of the constituency name is: Pest 13. OEVK. The seat is Dabas.

== Area ==
The constituency includes the following settlements:

1. Albertirsa
2. Ceglédbercel
3. Csévharaszt
4. Dabas
5. Dánszentmiklós
6. Hernád
7. Inárcs
8. Kakucs
9. Mikebuda
10. Nyáregyháza
11. Örkény
12. Pilis
13. Pusztavacs
14. Táborfalva
15. Tatárszentgyörgy
16. Újhartyán
17. Újlengyel
18. Vasad

== Elections ==
=== Parliamentary elections ===
==== Tisza Party primary election ====
2025 Opposition primary
Candidate	First round		Second round	
Candidate	Result	%	Result	%
Máté Hende	Passed	39	Candidate for Representative	70.4
Dr. Gabor Gimes	Passed	32	Eliminated	29.6
Imre Borbely	Eliminated	30	–	
Máté Hende wins the primary election.

== See also ==
- List of constituencies of Hungary
