= Dabas District =

Coordinates: 47.1833°N 19.3167°E

Dabas District Dabasi járás
- Districts of Hungary
- Coat of arms

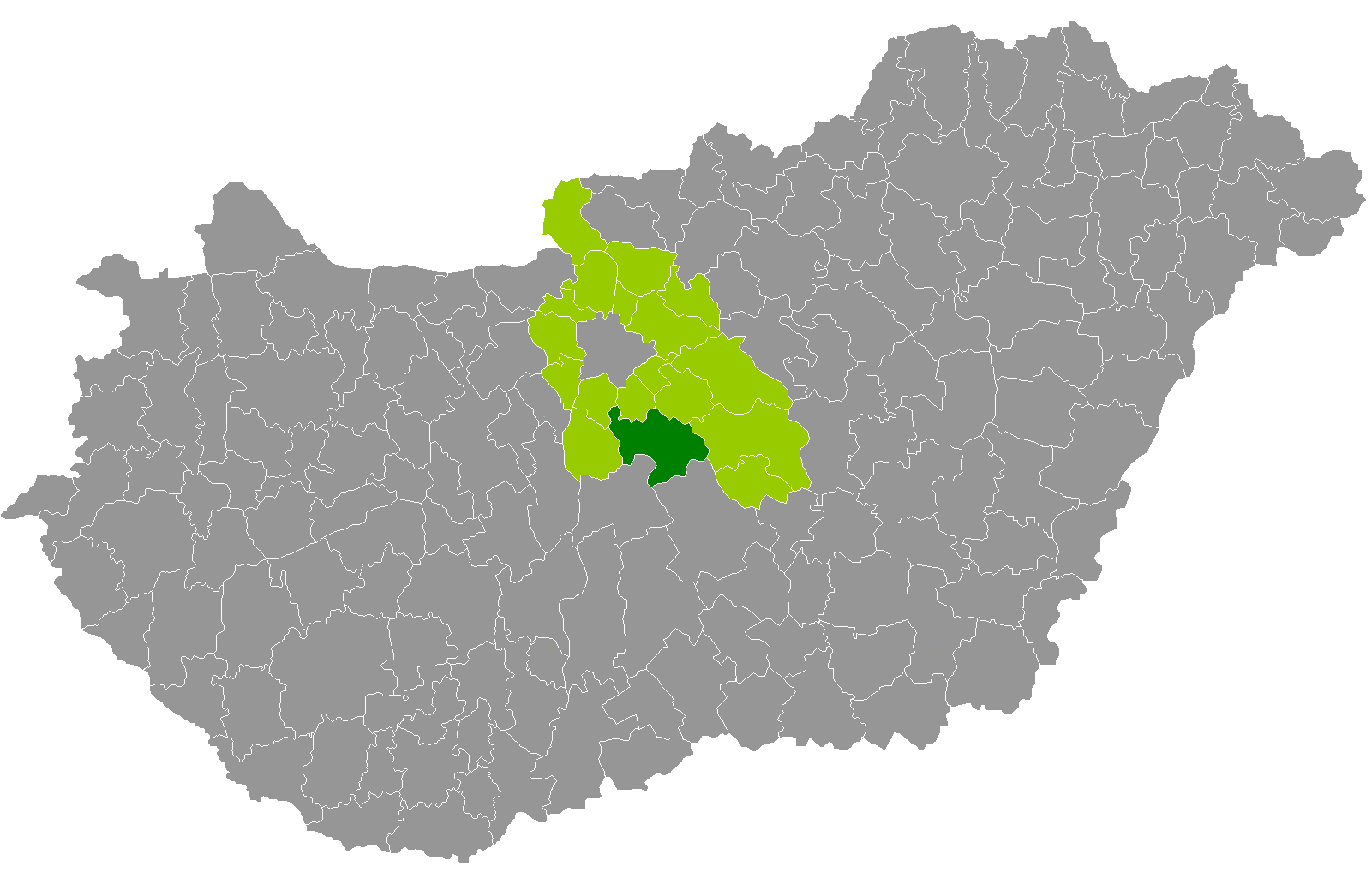
- Dabas District within Hungary and Pest County.
- Country: Hungary
- County: Pest
- District seat: Dabas

Area
  - Total: 614.23 km^{2} (237.16 sq mi)
  - Rank: 3rd in Pest

Population (2011 census)
  - Total: 48,289
  - Rank: 12th in Pest
  - Density: 79/km^{2} (200/sq mi)

Dabas (Hungarian: Dabasi járás) is a district in southern part of Pest County. Dabas is also the name of the town where the district seat is found. The district is located in the Central Hungary Statistical Region.

== Geography ==
Dabas District borders with Gyál District and Monor District to the north, Cegléd District to the east, Kecskemét District and Kunszentmiklós District (Bács-Kiskun County) to the south, Ráckeve District and Szigetszentmiklós District to the west. The number of the inhabited places in Dabas District is 11.

== Municipalities ==
The district has 3 towns, 2 large villages and 6 villages. (ordered by population, as of 1 January 2013)

- Bugyi (5,160)
- **Dabas** (16,506) – district seat
- Hernád (4,111)
- Inárcs (4,407)
- Kakucs (2,747)
- **Örkény** (4,836)
- Pusztavacs (1,367)
- Táborfalva (3,363)
- Tatárszentgyörgy (1,870)
- **Újhartyán** (2,707)
- Újlengyel (1,672)

The bolded municipalities are cities, italics municipalities are large villages.

== Demographics ==
Religion in Dabas District (2011 census)
1. Catholic Church (48.8%)
2. Greek Catholicism (0.40%)
3. Calvinism (9.50%)
4. Lutheranism (2.00%)
5. Other religions (1.50%)
6. Non-religious (12.8%)
7. Atheists (0.90%)
8. Undeclared (24.1%)

In 2011, it had a population of 48,289 and the population density was 79/km².

Year	County population	Change
2011	48,289	n/a

=== Ethnicity ===
Besides the Hungarian majority, the main minorities are the Roma (approx. 2,100), German (1,400), Slovak (1,200) and Romanian (300).

Total population (2011 census): 48,289
Ethnic groups (2011 census): Identified themselves: 47,774 persons:

- Hungarians: 42,305 (88.55%)
- Gypsies: 2,103 (4.40%)
- Germans: 1,391 (2.91%)
- Slovaks: 1,219 (2.55%)
- Others and indefinable: 756 (1.58%)

Approx. 500 persons in Dabas District did not declare their ethnic group at the 2011 census.

=== Religion ===
Religious adherence in the county according to 2011 census:

- Catholic – 23,774 (Roman Catholic – 23,568; Greek Catholic – 203);
- Reformed – 4,579;
- Evangelical – 948;
- other religions – 715;
- Non-religious – 6,181;
- Atheism – 426;
- Undeclared – 11,668.

== Gallery ==
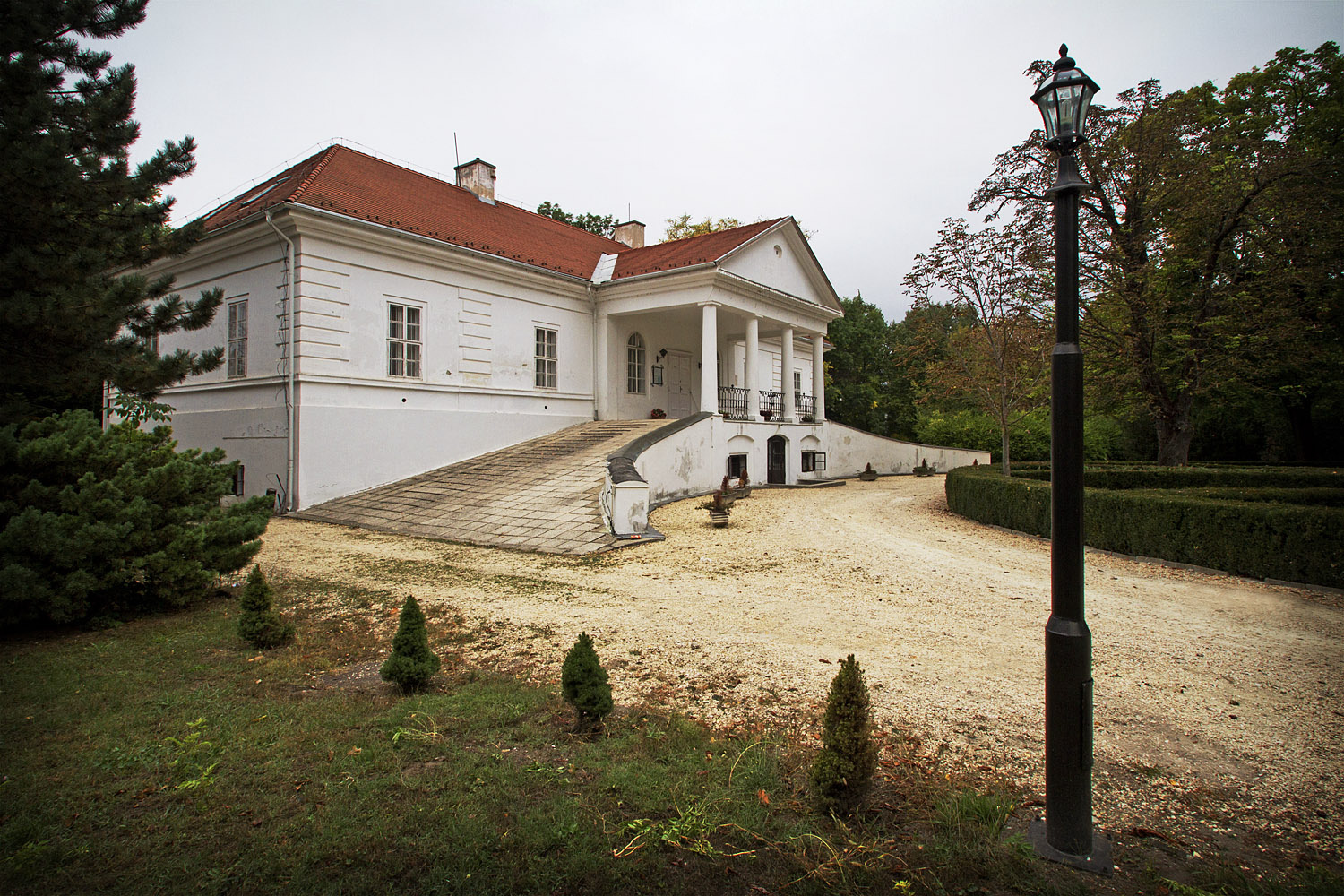
Mansion of Móric Halász in Dabas

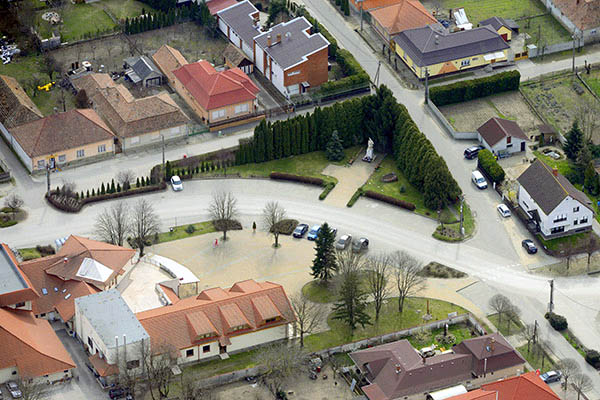
Aerial view of Újhartyán

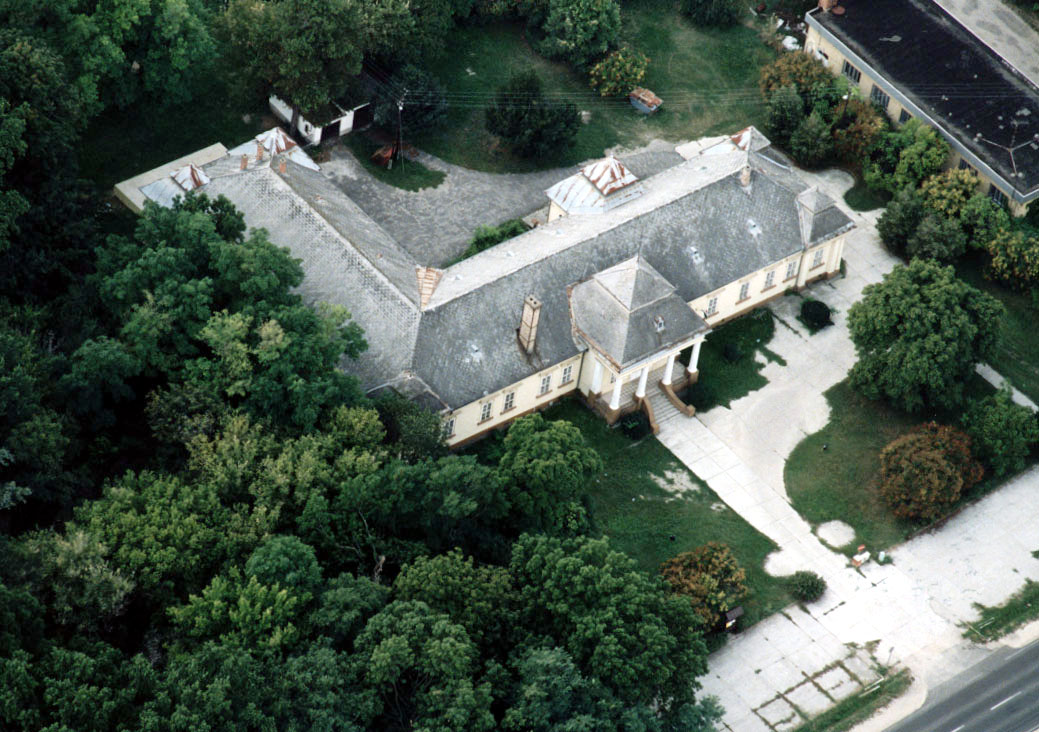
Pálóczy-Horváth Mansion in Örkény

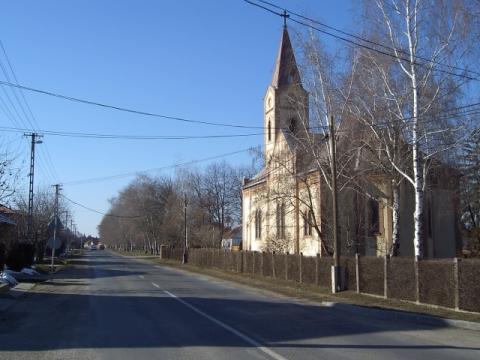
View of Kakucs

== See also ==
- List of cities and towns in Hungary
