= Pest County 9th constituency =

- Constituency for the National Assembly
- Location of Pest county 09 within Pest county

- Location of Pest county within Hungary
- County: Pest County
- Electorate: 75,622 (2026)
- Major settlements: Ráckeve

Current constituency
- Created: 2024
- Party: Tisza Party
- Member: Zita Bilisics
- Elected: 2026

The Pest County 9th parliamentary constituency is one of the 106 constituencies into which the territory of Hungary is divided by Act LXXIX of 2024, and in which voters can elect one member of the National Assembly. The standard abbreviation of the constituency name is: Pest 09. OEVK. The seat is Ráckeve.

== Area ==
The constituency includes the following settlements:

1. Alsónémedi
2. Apaj
3. Áporka
4. Bugyi
5. Délegyháza
6. Dömsöd
7. Dunavarsány
8. Kiskunlacháza
9. Lórév
10. Majosháza
11. Makád
12. Ócsa
13. Ráckeve
14. Szigetbecse
15. Szigetcsép
16. Szigetszentmárton
17. Szigetújfalu
18. Taksony
19. Tököl

== Members of parliament ==
Name	Party	Term	Elections
György Czerván	Fidesz-KDNP	2014 –	Results of the 2014 parliamentary election:
György Czerván	Fidesz-KDNP	2014 –	Results of the 2018 parliamentary election:
György Czerván	Fidesz-KDNP	2014 –	Results of the 2022 parliamentary election:
Zita Bilisics	Tisza Party	2026 – present	Results of the 2026 parliamentary election: 54.15%

== Demographics ==
Historical population
Year	Pop.	±%
2011	92,322	—
2022	94,129	+2.0%

The demographics of the constituency are as follows. The population of the 9th constituency of Pest County was 94,129 on 1 October 2022. The population of the constituency increased by 1,807 between the 2011 and 2022 censuses. Based on the age composition, the majority of the population in the constituency is middle-aged with 33,539 people, while the least is children with 17,686 people. 82.2% of the population of the constituency has internet access.

According to the highest level of completed education, those with a high school diploma are the most numerous, with 24,384 people, followed by skilled workers with 21,144 people.

According to economic activity, almost half of the population is employed, 45,068 people, the second most significant group is inactive earners, who are mainly pensioners, with 21,860 people.

The most significant ethnic group in the constituency is the Roma with 1,961 people and the Romanian with 313 people. The proportion of foreign citizens without Hungarian citizenship is 0.7%.

According to religious composition, the largest religion of the residents of the constituency is Roman Catholic (29,525 people), and a significant community is the Calvinist (4,595 people). The number of those not belonging to a religious community is also significant (7,818 people), the second largest group in the constituency after the Roman Catholic religion.

== Sources ==
- ↑ Vjt.: "2011. évi CCIII. törvény az országgyűlési képviselők választásáról". Nemzeti Jogszabálytár. Magyar Közlöny Lap- és Könyvkiadó Kft.
- ↑ KSH: "Az országgyűlési egyéni választókerületek adatai". Népszámlálás 2011. Központi Statisztikai Hivatal.
