= Hernád (disambiguation) =

The Hernád is a river in Slovakia and Hungary.

Hernád may also refer to:

- Hernád István Róbert (born 1945), Hungarian cognitive scientist
- Hernád János, Hungarian mathematical physicist
- Hernád, Hungary, a municipality in Dabas District, Pest County, Hungary
