= Gyál District =

Coordinates: 47.3833°N 19.2167°E

Gyál District Gyáli járás
- District
- Coat of arms

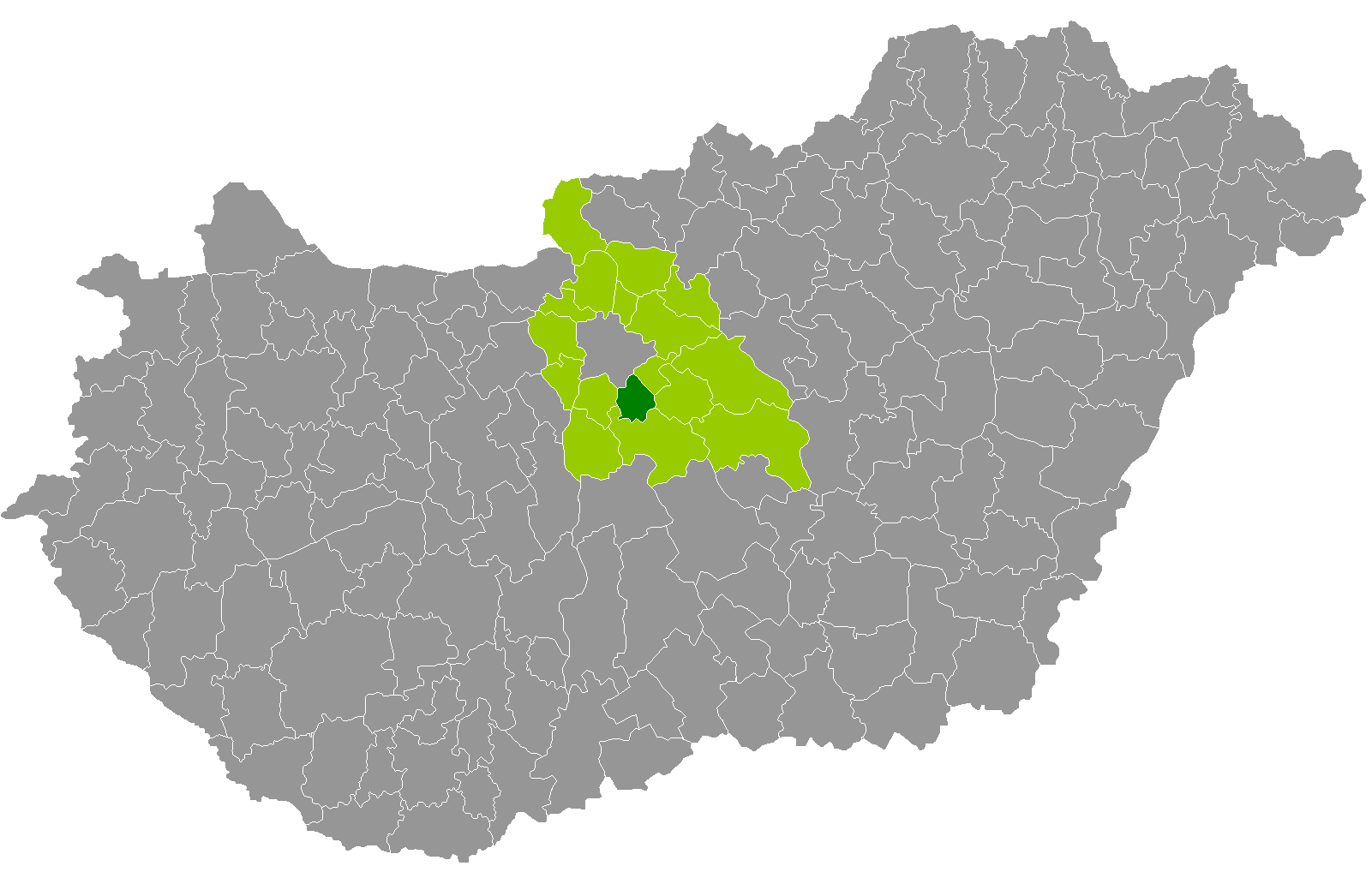
- Gyál District within Hungary and Pest County.
- Country: Hungary
- County: Pest
- District seat: Gyál

Area
  - Total: 170.99 km^{2} (66.02 sq mi)
  - Rank: 15th in Pest

Population (2011 census)
  - Total: 40,853
  - Rank: 14th in Pest
  - Density: 239/km^{2} (620/sq mi)

Gyál (Hungarian: Gyáli járás) is a district in central-southern part of Pest County. Gyál is also the name of the town where the district seat is found. The district is located in the Central Hungary Statistical Region.

== Geography ==
Gyál District borders with Budapest to the north, Vecsés District and Monor District to the east, Dabas District to the south, Szigetszentmiklós District to the west. The number of the inhabited places in Gyál District is 4.

== Municipalities ==
The district has 2 towns, 1 large village and 1 village. (ordered by population, as of 1 January 2013)

- Alsónémedi (5,203)
- Felsőpakony (3,324)
- **Gyál** (22,709) – district seat
- **Ócsa** (9,073)

The bolded municipalities are cities, italics municipality is large village.

== Demographics ==
Religion in Gyál District (2011 census)
1. Catholic Church (28.0%)
2. Greek Catholicism (1.10%)
3. Calvinism (15.6%)
4. Lutheranism (0.70%)
5. Other religions (3.10%)
6. Non-religious (18.6%)
7. Atheists (1.40%)
8. Undeclared (31.5%)

In 2011, it had a population of 40,853 and the population density was 239/km^{2}.

Year	County population	Change
2011	40,853	n/a

=== Ethnicity ===
Besides the Hungarian majority, the main minorities are the Roma (approx. 550), Romanian (350) and German (250).

Total population (2011 census): 40,853
Ethnic groups (2011 census): Identified themselves: 36,291 persons:

- Hungarians: 34,631 (95.43%)
- Gypsies: 549 (1.51%)
- Others and indefinable: 1,111 (3.06%)

Approx. 3,500 persons in Gyál District did not declare their ethnic group at the 2011 census.

=== Religion ===
Religious adherence in the county according to 2011 census:

- Catholic – 11,869 (Roman Catholic – 11,425; Greek Catholic – 442);
- Reformed – 6,383;
- Evangelical – 291;
- other religions – 1,251;
- Non-religious – 7,626;
- Atheism – 573;
- Undeclared – 12,860.

== Gallery ==
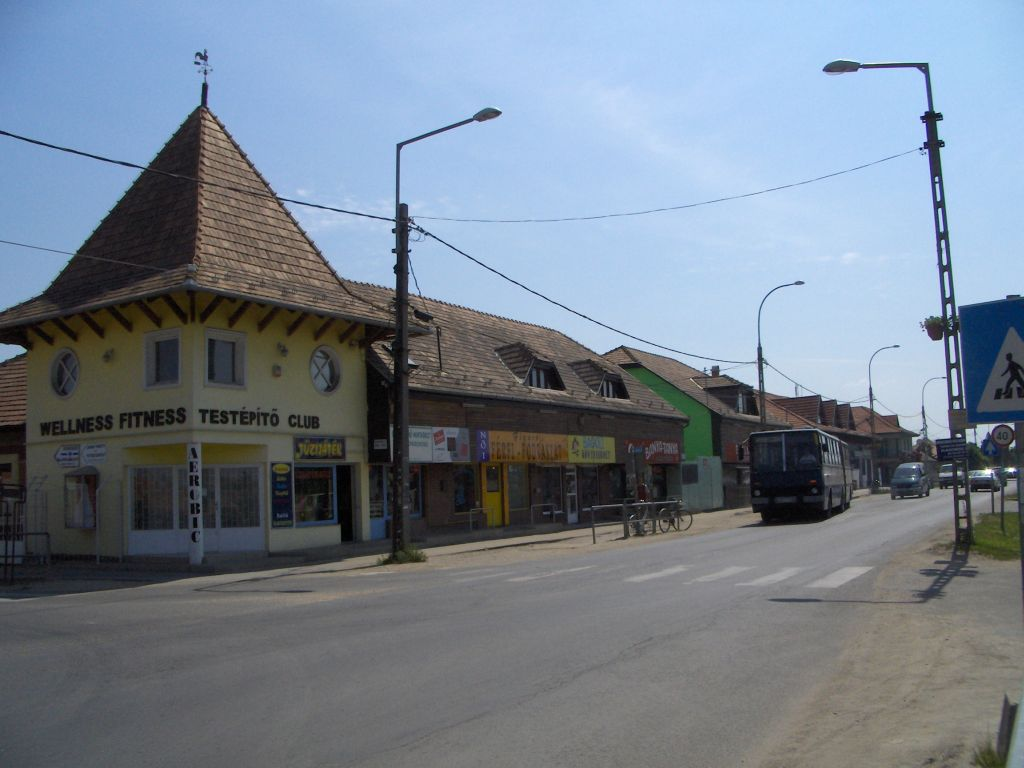
Downtown of Gyál

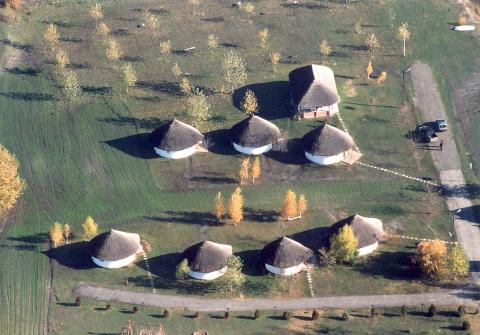
Aerial view of Alsónémedi

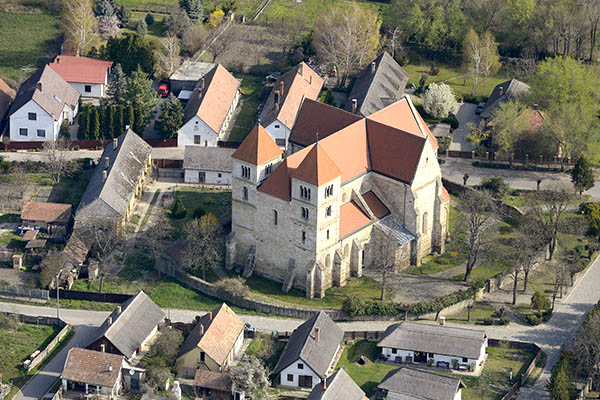
Monastery of Ócsa

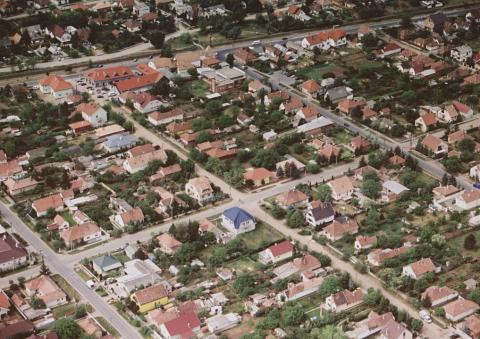
Aerial view of Gyál

== See also ==
- List of cities and towns in Hungary
