= Northern Great Plain =

Coordinates: 47°31′48″N 21°38′21″E

Northern Great Plain Észak-Alföld
- Region
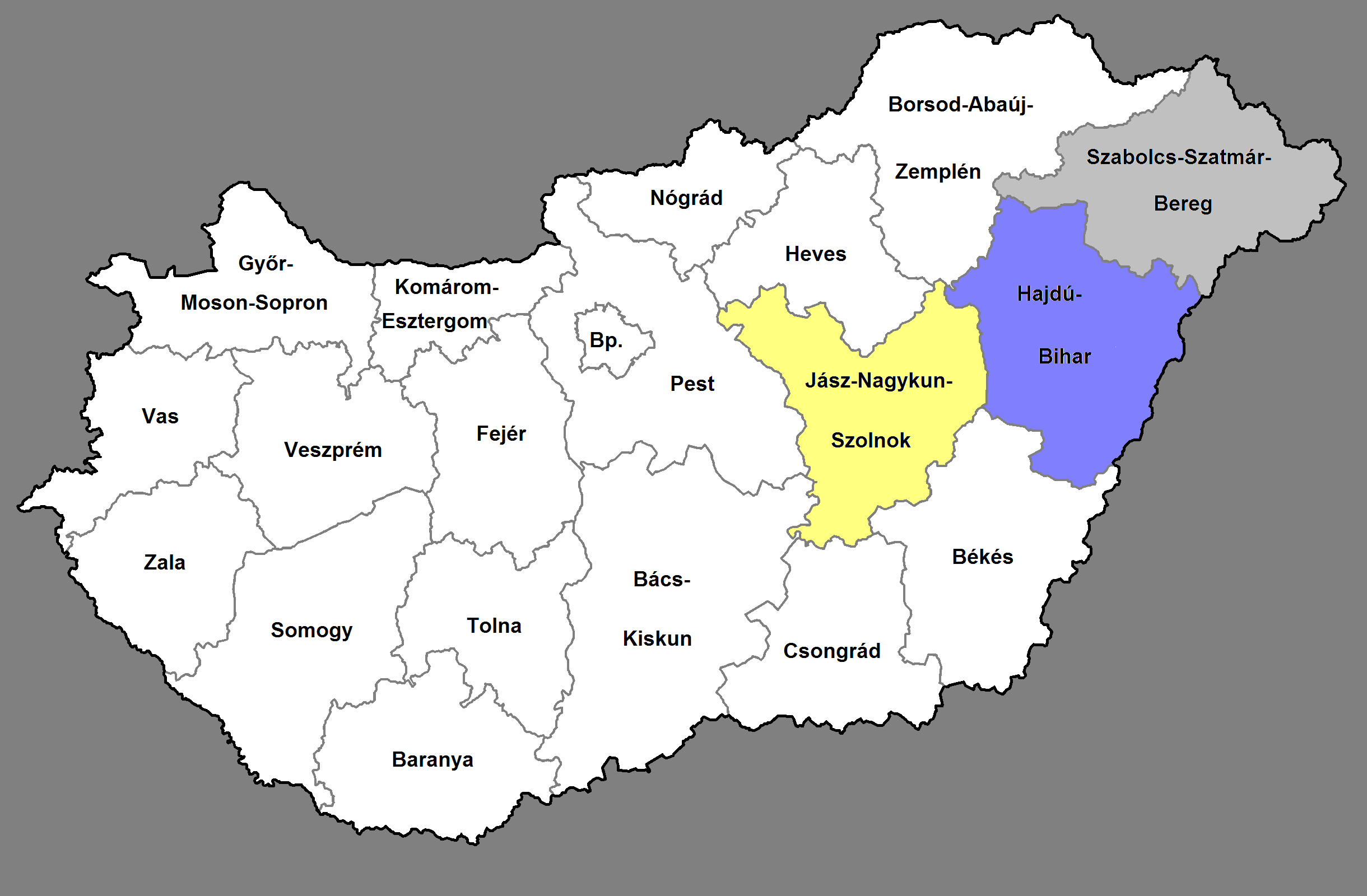
- Country: Hungary
- Capital city: Debrecen

Area
  - Total: 17,749 km^{2} (6,853 sq mi)

Population
  - Total: 1,514,020
  - Density: 85/km^{2} (220/sq mi)
- Time zone: UTC+1 (CET)
  - Summer (DST): UTC+2 (CEST)
- NUTS code: HU32
- GDP per capita (PPS): €12,900 (2017)
- HDI (2019): 0.831 very high · 6th

The Northern Great Plain (Hungarian: Észak-Alföld ['eːsɒk 'ɒlføld]) is a statistical (NUTS 2) region of Hungary. It is part of the Great Plain and North (NUTS 1) region. The Northern Great Plain includes the counties of Hajdú-Bihar, Jász-Nagykun-Szolnok, and Szabolcs-Szatmár-Bereg, with a total area of 17,749 km^{2} (6,853 sq mi) and a population of around 1.5 million. The region is in the eastern part of Hungary. It borders northern Hungary to the north, Ukraine to the north-east, Romania to the south-east, the Southern Great Plain region of Hungary to the south, and central Hungary to the west. The region's centre, and capital city is Debrecen, the second largest city within Hungary.

== Gallery ==
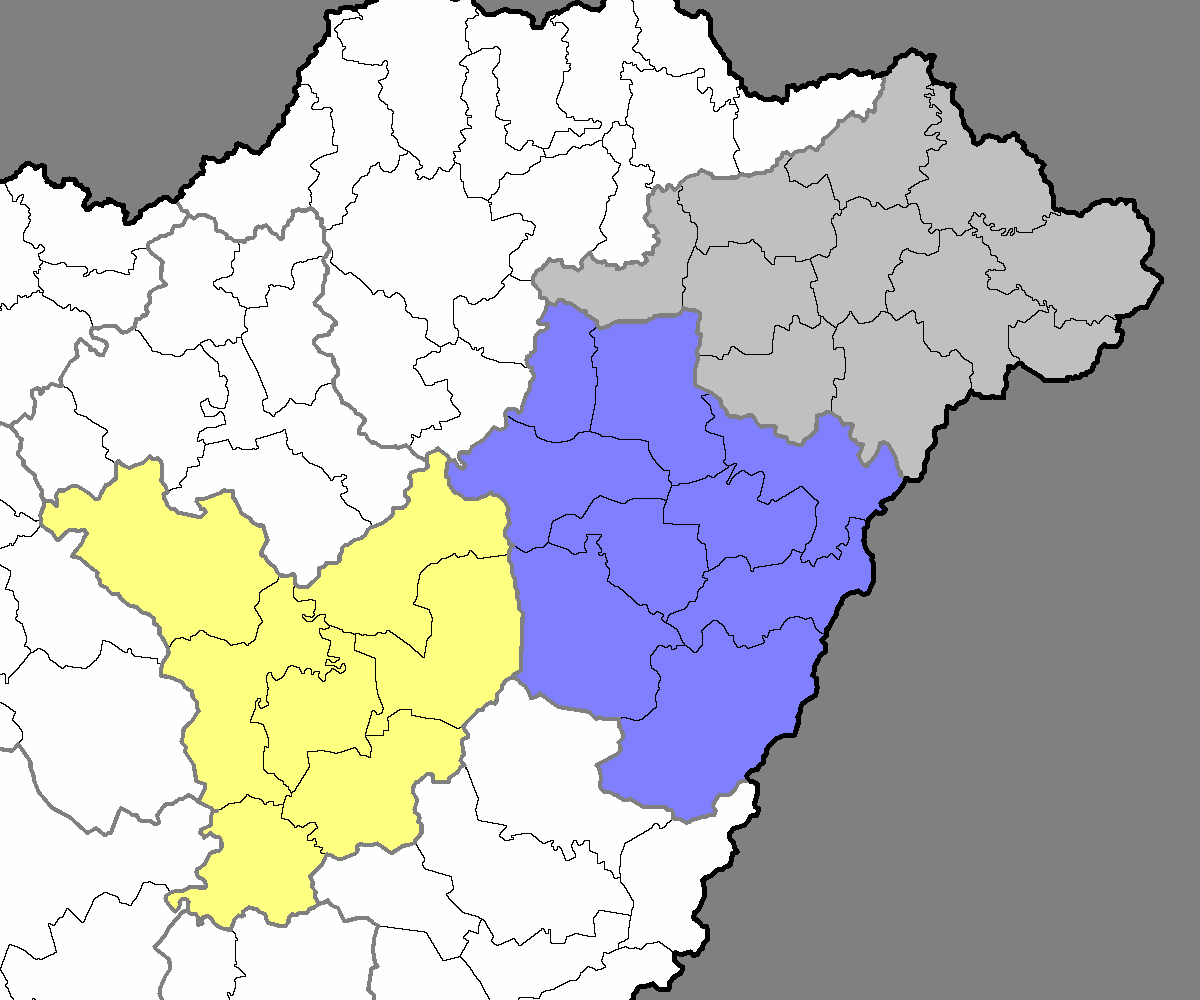

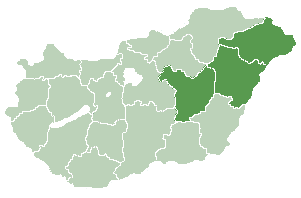

== See also ==
- List of regions of Hungary
