= Bugyi =

- Large village
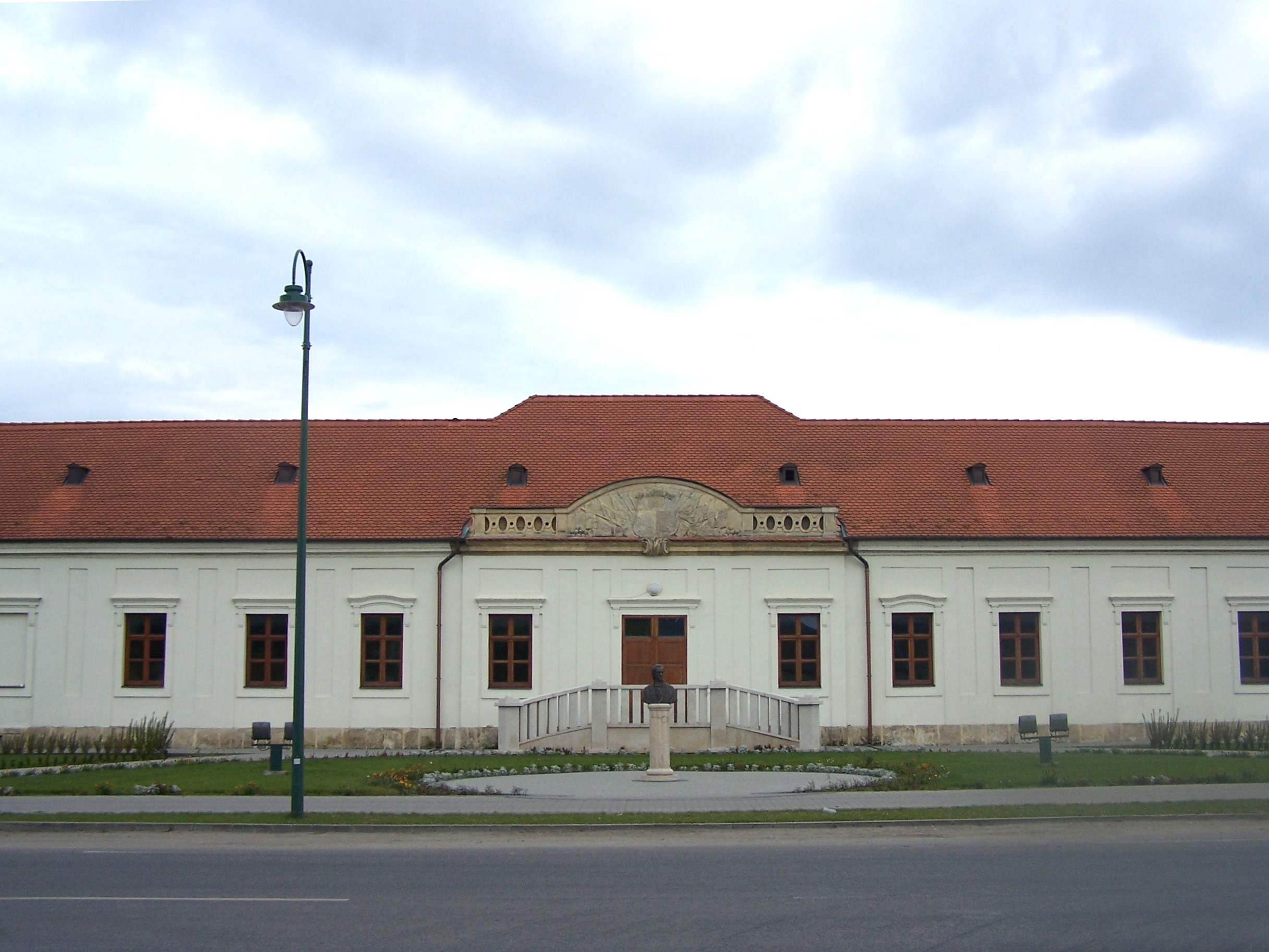
- Beleznay Palace

- Coat of arms

- Location of Bugyi
- Coordinates: 47.134029°N 19.08523°E
- Country: Hungary
- County: Pest
- District: Dabas

Population
  - Total: 5,272
- Time zone: UTC+1 (CET)
  - Summer (DST): UTC+2 (CEST)
- Postal code: 2347
- Area code: (+36) 29

Bugyi is a village in Pest County, Hungary. It is noted for its unusual name, meaning "panties" in Hungarian.

== Geography ==
Bugyi is a village of 5,149 residents with an area of 11,558 hectares (28,560 acres; 45 sq mi). It lies about 30 km south of Budapest. The village is located at the intersection of the roads connecting Ócsa to Kiskunlacháza and Taksony to Dabas and Kunpeszér. However, the village is not directly linked into major state highways.

== Etymology ==
Contrary to popular belief, the place name has no etymological connection to the contemporary Hungarian word "bugyi", meaning panties, which is instead derived from "bugyogó", meaning baggy underwear.

The name of the town first appeared in official documents as Latin “Bevd” in 1321 of a form Budymatheusfelde (translation: Matthew Bugy land). It is named from the personal names starting with "Bud" (from the verb "to be") of the original Slavic settlers. Examples include: Budweis (to be wise), Budik (awaken), Budimir (peaceful). The -i suffix in Hungarian "Bugy-i" denotes possession, meaning "of Bud".

== History ==
The township was fused from several medieval villages (Bugy, Vány, Ráda, Ürbo). The region's natural and economic development was defined by the Danube's ancient riverbank, which was drained in the 1920s. As a result of its various soil types and microclimate, the region is especially well suited for agricultural production; hence, its important role in providing the capital with fresh produce. The town neighbors an area of gravel mines, so its geography is spackled with mining lakes.

== Sightseeing ==
Bugyi's historical landmarks are concentrated around its triangular Baroque main square. St. Adalbert Roman Catholic church, for example, was built in 1761 by Count Károly, I. Eszterházy, Bishop of Vác. The Beleznay Castle hosted important Hungarian cultural figures in the distant past. Next to the Lutheran church, which was built in 1783, there is the so-called “shame stone,” a monument probably from the time of the Avars. We can still find the marble head stones in the Jewish cemetery. At present, one of the town's most festive events is the harvest pageant every October.

One of Bugyi's significant treasures is its rich flora and fauna. The area's rich bird and game life attracts hunters and nature lovers from home and abroad. The township's southwestern fields ease into the Kiskunság National Park, which is known as one of Central-Europe's birding paradises with its saline lakes and wetlands. Some of its rare treasures are the Great Bustard or the 9.4-hectare protected ancient marshland's most beautiful flower Iris pumila.

== Demographics ==
As of 2022, the town was 88.5% Hungarian, 0.8% Romanian, 0.6% German, and 1.4% of non-European origin. The remainder chose not to respond. The population was 21.7% Roman Catholic, and 18.9% Reformed.

== Twin city ==
- Arad - Romania
