= Zita Bilisics =

Hungarian politician

Member of the National Assembly
- Assuming office 9 May 2026
- Succeeding: György Czerván
- Constituency: Pest 9th

Personal details
- Party: Tisza

Zita Bilisics is a Hungarian politician who was elected member of the National Assembly in 2026 representing the Pest County 9th constituency. She previously worked as a jurist.
