= Máté Hende =

Hungarian politician

Member of the National Assembly
- Incumbent
- Assumed office 9 May 2026
- Preceded by: Constituency established
- Constituency: Pest 13th

Personal details
- Party: TISZA

Máté Hende is a Hungarian politician who was elected member of the National Assembly in 2026. He is a former national champion in competitive dance.
