= List of Hungarian regions by Human Development Index =

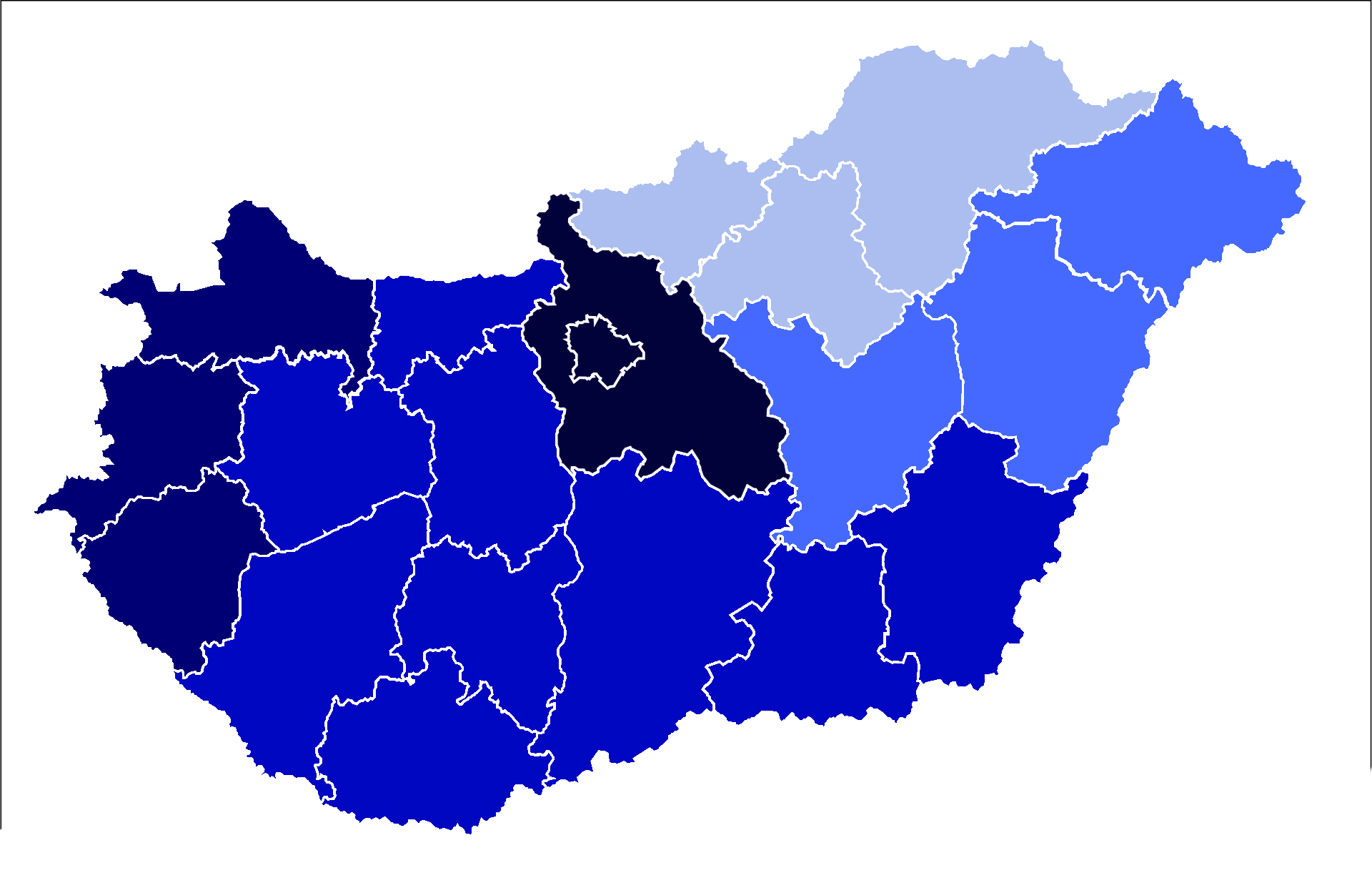
Hungarian regions by Human Development Index in 2021 > 0.900 0.900 – 0.850 0.849 – 0.835 0.835 – 0.820 <0.820

This is a list of NUTS2 statistical regions of Hungary by Human Development Index as of 2024 with data for the year 2023.

Rank	Region	HDI (2023)
Very high human development
1	Central Hungary	0.957
2	Western Transdanubia	0.888
–	Hungary (average)	0.877
3	Central Transdanubia	0.874
3	Southern Great Plain	0.874
5	Southern Transdanubia	0.866
6	Northern Great Plain	0.856
7	Northern Hungary	0.843
