= Csévharaszt =

- Coat of arms

- Location of Csévharaszt in Hungary
- Coordinates: 47.30056°N 19.43282°E
- Country: Hungary
- Region: Central Hungary
- County: Pest
- Subregion: Monori kistérség
- Rank: Village

Government
  - Mayor: Mocsáry Balázs

Area
  - Total: 49.23 km^{2} (19.01 sq mi)

Population (1 January 2008)
  - Total: 1,930
  - Density: 39.2/km^{2} (102/sq mi)
- Time zone: UTC+1 (CET)
  - Summer (DST): UTC+2 (CEST)
- Postal code: 2212
- Area code: +36 29
- KSH code: 18476
- Website: www.csevharaszt.hu

Csévharaszt is a village in Pest county, Hungary.
