= Apaj =

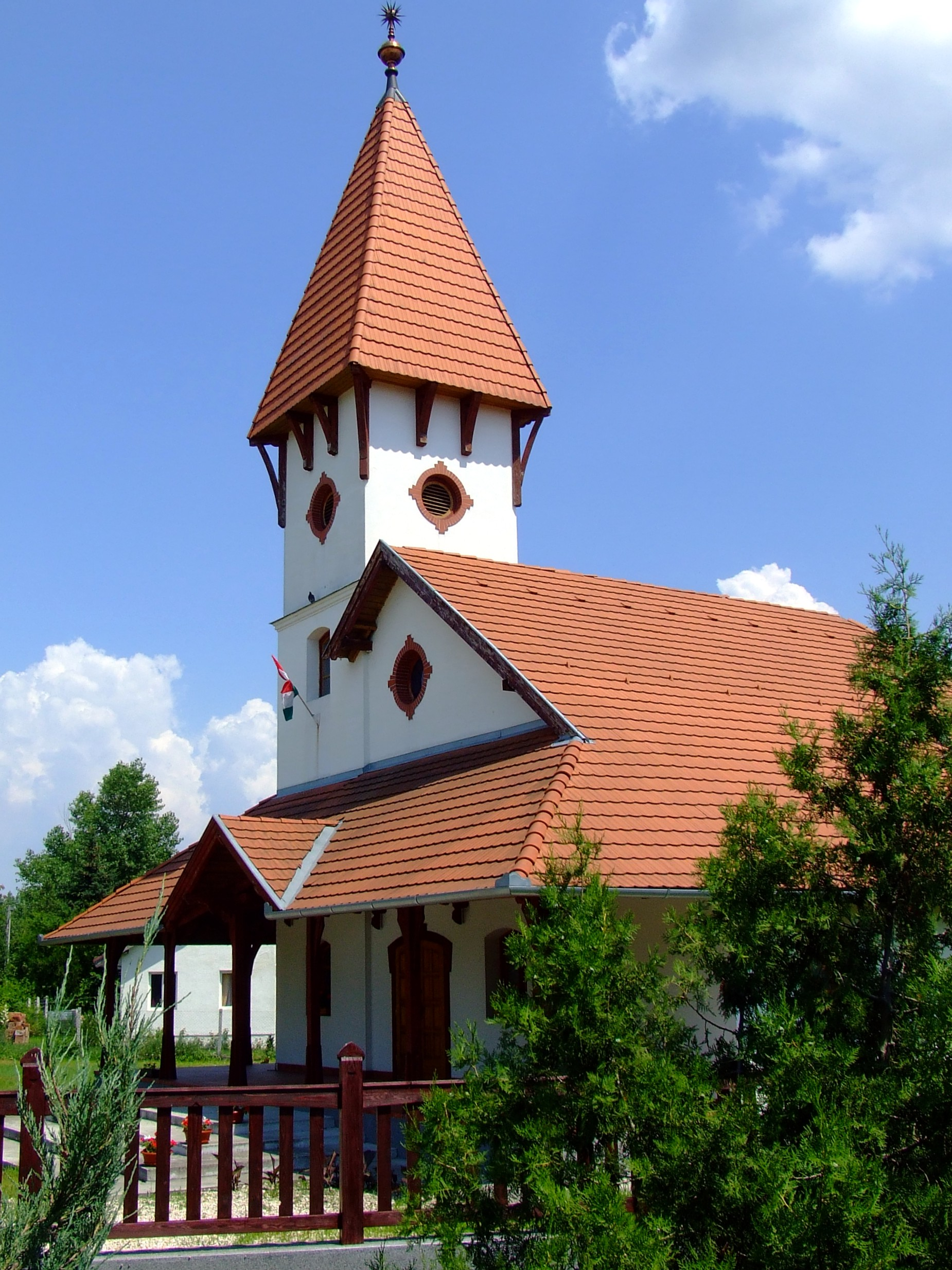
- Calvinist Church of Apaj

- Coat of arms

- Location of Apaj in Hungary
- Coordinates: 47°15′N 19°37′E
- Country: Hungary
- Region: Central Hungary
- County: Pest
- Subregion: Ráckevei
- Rank: Village

Government
  - Mayor: Pál Novák

Area
  - Total: 71.04 km^{2} (27.43 sq mi)

Population
  - Total: 1,257
  - Density: 17.69/km^{2} (45.83/sq mi)
- Time zone: UTC+1 (CET)
  - Summer (DST): UTC+2 (CEST)
- Postal code: 2345
- Area code: +36 24
- KSH code: 33561
- Website: www.apaj.hu

Apaj is a village in Pest County, Hungary.

== Location ==
The village is in the neighbourhood of Kiskunság National Park and is 50 km (30 mi) from Budapest. Primary route 51 serves the village by road. The Budapest–Kelebia railway line's station, Dömsöd is next to Apaj. The River Ráckeve-Duna is 8 km (5 mi) from the village.

== History ==
The first mention of the village is in 1291 as Opoy. It was royal property for a while, but later it was owned by nuns who lived on Margaret Island. The Balassa family owned Apaj as well.

In the 15th century there were two parts to Apaj: Alsóapaj (Lower Apaj) and Felsőapaj (Upper Apaj). During the Turkish rule of Ottoman Hungary the village suffered almost complete destruction, but from the 19th century the village was growing. At that time the village was called Hungarian: Apajpuszta (Apaj Plain).

After 1945 Apaj lost its title as a separate manor and it became part of Dömsöd, but thanks to the Kinskunsag State Farm it once again became an independent village in 1985.

Apaj is famous of for horse breeding and cattle breeding and has an international reputation for racehorses. There are many Great bustards too.

Between 1967 and 2006 the village held the Kiskunsag Shepherd and Jockey Festival.

== Landmarks ==
- Reformed church, which was built with the help of the Széchenyi Plan and dedicated on 24 April 2005
- Millennium Park
- Upper Kiskunsag Plain is part of the Kiskunsag National Park.
