= Inárcs =

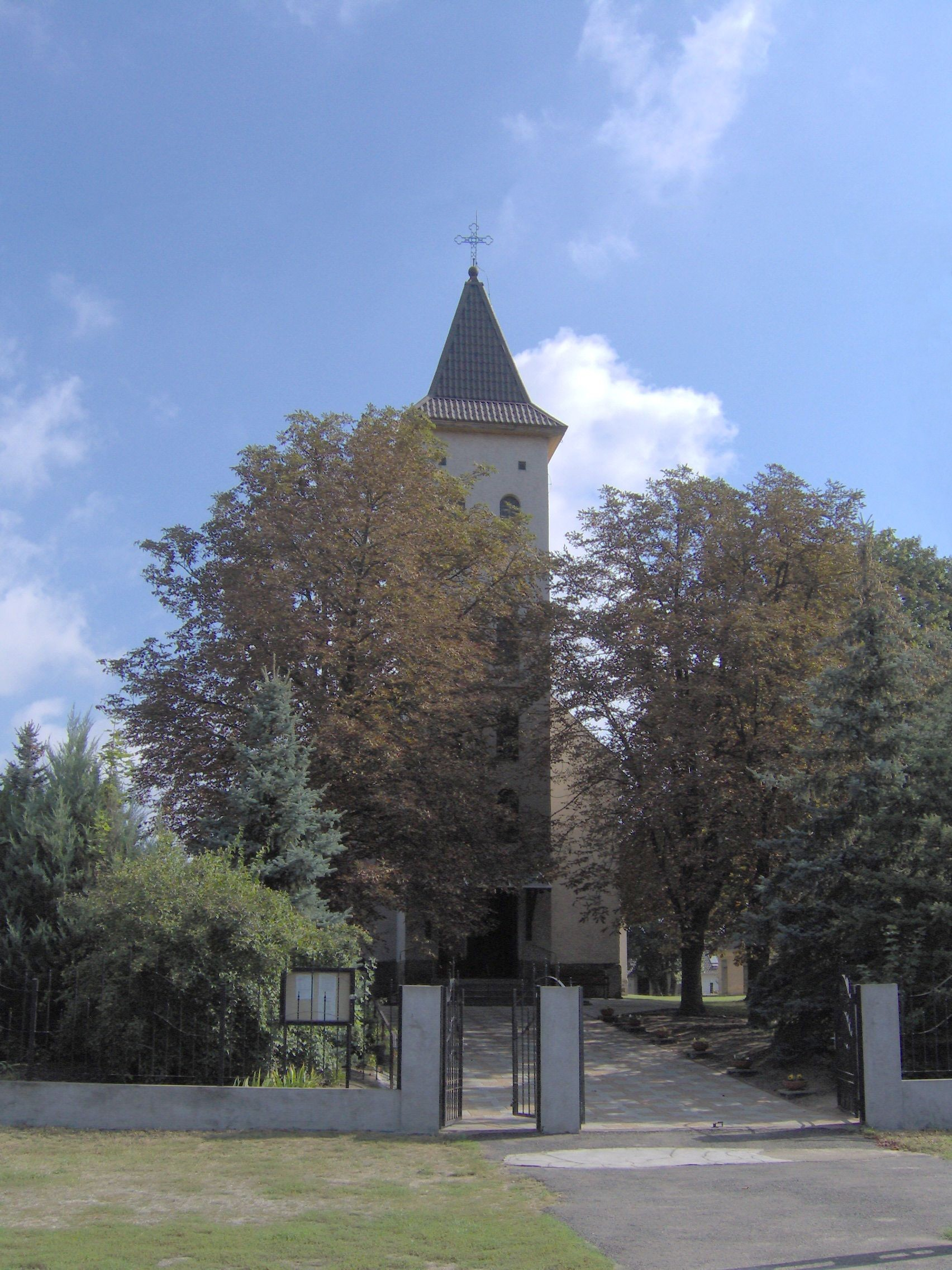
- Church of the Holy Name of Mary

- Flag Coat of arms

- Location of Inárcs in Hungary
- Coordinates: 47°16′N 19°20′E
- Country: Hungary
- Region: Central Hungary
- County: Pest
- Subregion: Dabasi
- Rank: Village

Government
  - Mayor: Imre László Gál

Area
  - Total: 22.53 km^{2} (8.70 sq mi)

Population (1 January 2008)
  - Total: 4,452
  - Density: 197.6/km^{2} (511.8/sq mi)
- Time zone: UTC+1 (CET)
  - Summer (DST): UTC+2 (CEST)
- Postal code: 2365
- Area code: +36 29
- KSH code: 32106
- Website: www.inarcs.hu

Inárcs is a village in Pest county, Hungary.
