= Táborfalva =

- Coat of arms

- Location of Táborfalva in Hungary
- Coordinates: 47°6′10.80″N 19°29′0.31″E
- Country: Hungary
- Region: Central Hungary
- County: Pest
- Subregion: Dabasi
- Rank: Village

Government
  - Mayor: Nagy Andrásné

Area
  - Total: 42.05 km^{2} (16.24 sq mi)

Population (1 January 2008)
  - Total: 3,448
  - Density: 82.00/km^{2} (212.4/sq mi)
- Time zone: UTC+1 (CET)
  - Summer (DST): UTC+2 (CEST)
- Postal code: 2381
- Area code: +36 29
- KSH code: 08332
- Website: www.taborfalva.hu

Táborfalva is a village in Pest county, Hungary.
