= Hernád, Hungary =

Hernád
- Large village (nagyközség)
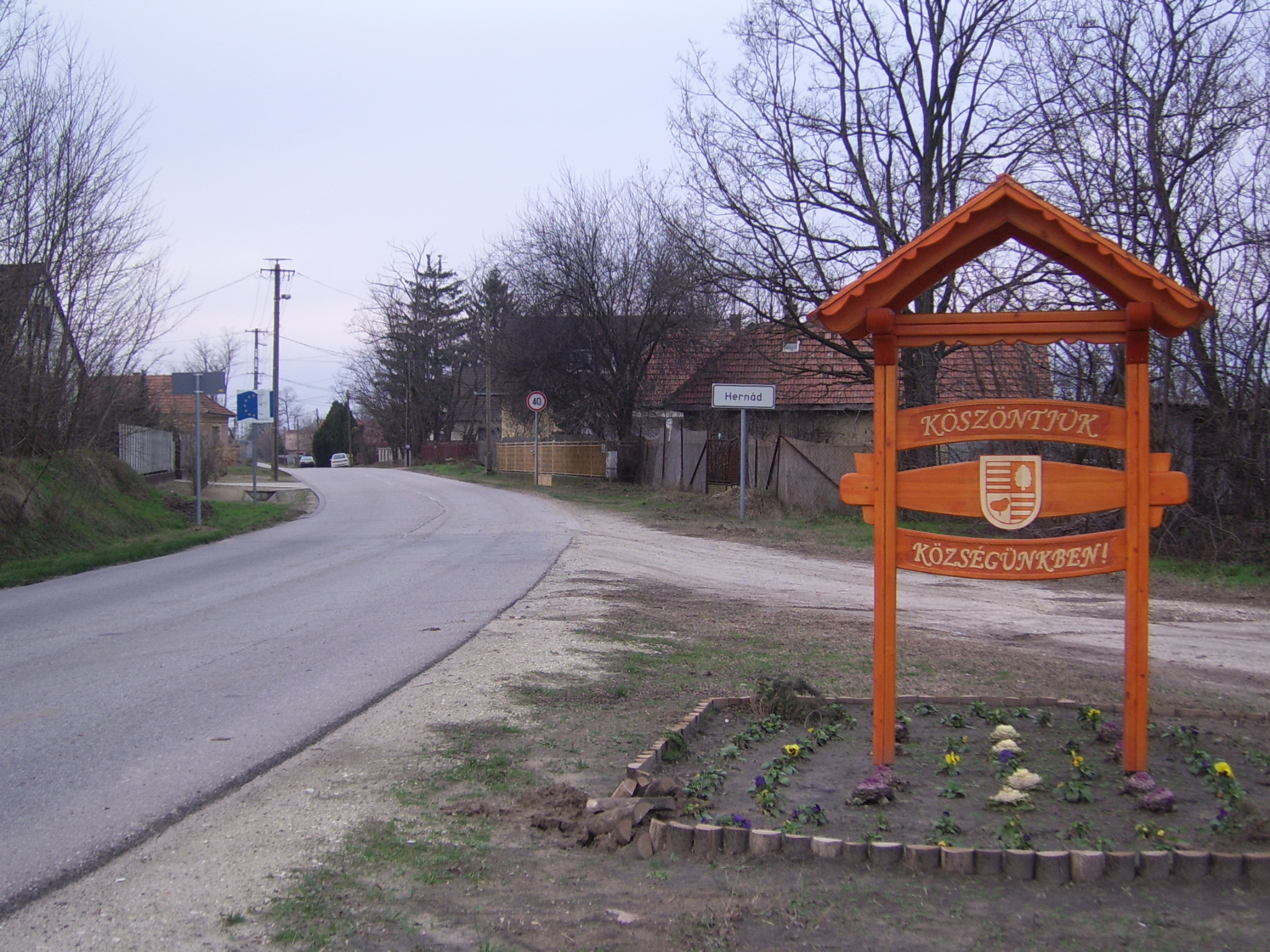
- Entrance to Hernád

- Coat of arms

- Location of Pest County in Hungary

- Location of Hernád in Hungary
- Coordinates: 47°09′48″N 19°24′19″E
- Country: Hungary
- Region: Central Hungary
- County: Pest County
- District: Dabas

Government
  - Mayor: Zsírosné Pallaga Mária (Ind.)

Area
  - Total: 27.06 km^{2} (10.45 sq mi)

Population (1 Jan. 2022)
  - Total: 4,218
  - Density: 155.88/km^{2} (403.7/sq mi)
- Time zone: UTC+1 (CET)
  - Summer (DST): UTC+2 (CEST)
- Postal code: 2376
- Area code: 29
- Website: http://hernad.hu/

Hernád is a large village in Dabas District, Pest County, Central Hungary, Hungary.
