= György Czerván =

Hungarian politician

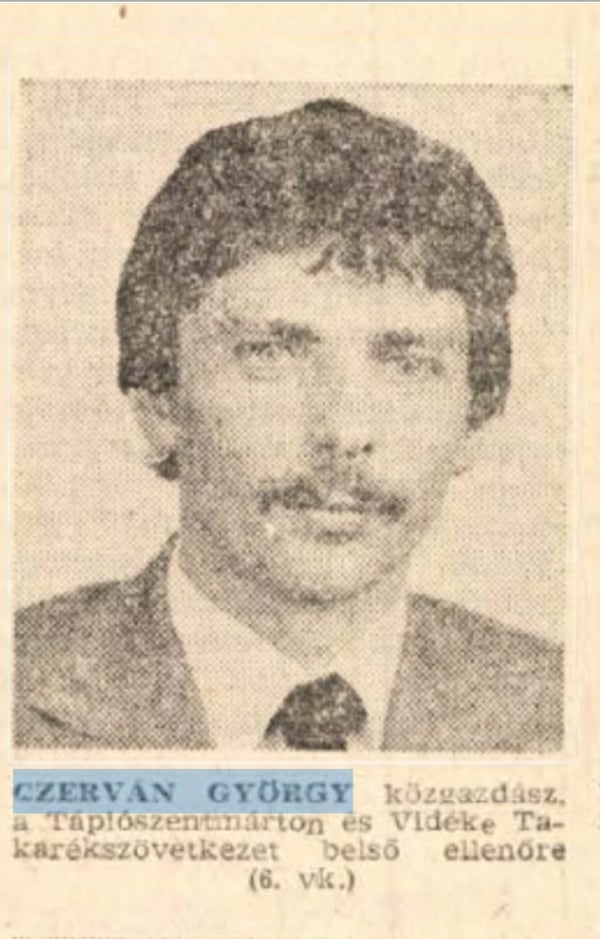
- Czerván in 1985

Member of the National Assembly
- In office 18 June 1998 – 8 May 2026

Personal details
- Born: 12 July 1959 (age 66) Cegléd, Hungary
- Party: Fidesz (since 1990)
- Other political affiliations: Patriotic People's Front (1985); Agrarian Alliance (1989–1990)
- Spouse: Mária Németh
- Children: 2
- Profession: politician

György Czerván (born 12 July 1959) is a Hungarian politician, member of the National Assembly (MP) for Nagykáta (Pest County Constituency VI then IX) from 1998 to 2026. He was a member of the Committee on Agriculture from 12 December 1998 to 13 May 2010.

He was appointed Secretary of State for Agricultural Economy in the Ministry of Rural Development in the second Cabinet of Viktor Orbán on 2 June 2010. He served in this capacity until 17 May 2018.

== Career ==
Czerván ran as a candidate of the Communist-backed Patriotic People's Front in Tápiószele (Pest County 6th constituency) during the 1985 parliamentary election. He was elected as a substitute MP after Ferenc Dobi.

Czerván ran in the parliamentary elections of 1990 as a candidate of the Agrarian Alliance. In the summer of 1990 he founded the Tápiószentmárton branch of Fidesz, of which he was president until 1994. He was elected local representative in the October 1990 local elections, and was appointed Deputy Mayor of Tápiószentmárton. He retained his positions in local government until 2002. In the parliamentary elections of May 1994 he was again unsuccessful. He was, however, elected as a member of the Pest County General Assembly in the local elections in December, where he is active as deputy chairman of the Agricultural Committee.

In the 1998 general elections he secured a seat as MP for Nagykáta (Constituency 6, Pest County). He was on the Agricultural Committee. He managed to keep his seat in the parliamentary elections on 21 April 2002 as an individual candidate, and continued his legislative work in the Agricultural Committee. On 20 October 2002 he was elected to the body of representatives of Tápiószentmárton for the fourth time. Since the transformation in 2003-2004 he has been chairman of Fidesz-Hungarian Civic Alliance in the Nagykáta constituency.

He secured a seat in Parliament in the 2006 and 2010 general elections from Pest County 6th constituency. Since 2014 he has represented Pest County 9th constituency. He served as vice-chairman of the Agricultural Committee from 2018 to 2026. He did not run in the 2026 Hungarian parliamentary election.

== Personal life ==
He is married. His wife is Mária Czervánné Németh. They have a daughter, Györgyi and a son, György.
