= Alsónémedi =

- Large village
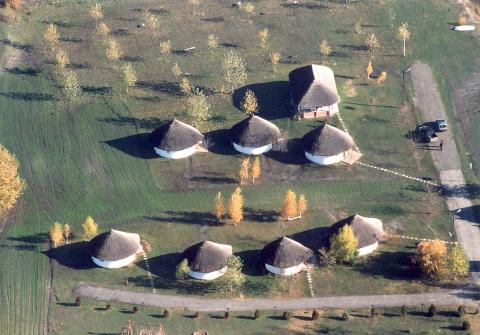
- Old houses of Alsónémedi

- Coat of arms

- Location of Alsónémedi
- Coordinates: 47°18′52″N 19°09′56″E
- Country: Hungary
- County: Pest
- District: Gyál

Area
  - Total: 49.07 km^{2} (18.95 sq mi)

Population (2025)
  - Total: 5,584
  - Density: 113.8/km^{2} (294.7/sq mi)
- Time zone: UTC+1 (CET)
  - Summer (DST): UTC+2 (CEST)
- Postal code: 2351
- Area code: (+36) 29

Alsónémedi is a large village in Pest County, Hungary. It had a population of 5,584 in 2025. It is in the Budapest metropolitan area.

== Twin towns - sister cities ==
- Aita Mare, Romania
- Pelplin, Poland
- Xgħajra, Malta
- Colletorto, Italy
- (North Macedonia) Demir Kapija, North Macedónia
- Pforzheim, Germany
