= Gyál =

- Town
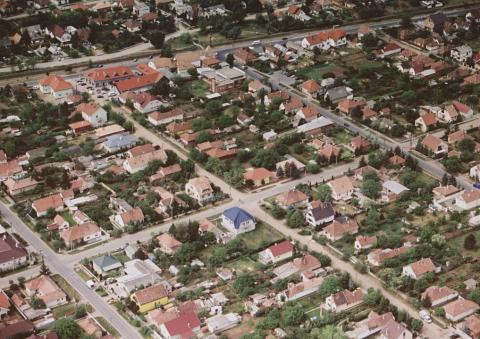
- Aerial view of Gyál

- Flag Coat of arms

- Location of Gyál
- Coordinates: 47.38607°N 19.21922°E
- Country: Hungary
- County: Pest
- District: Gyál

Area
  - Total: 24.93 km^{2} (9.63 sq mi)

Population (2007)
  - Total: 22,552
  - Density: 873.12/km^{2} (2,261.4/sq mi)
- Time zone: UTC+1 (CET)
  - Summer (DST): UTC+2 (CEST)
- Postal code: 2360
- Area code: (+36) 29
- Website: www.gyal.hu

Gyál [ɟaːl] is a town in Pest county, Budapest metropolitan area, Hungary. It has a population of 22,552. In 1949 it had only 4,104 inhabitants. During the socialist era, Gyál become a garden suburb of Budapest.

== Twin towns – sister cities ==
Gyál is twinned with:

- Chibed, Romania

== Notable people ==
- Alex Tóth, footballer
