= Pusztavacs =

Coordinates: 47°10′17″N 19°30′04″E

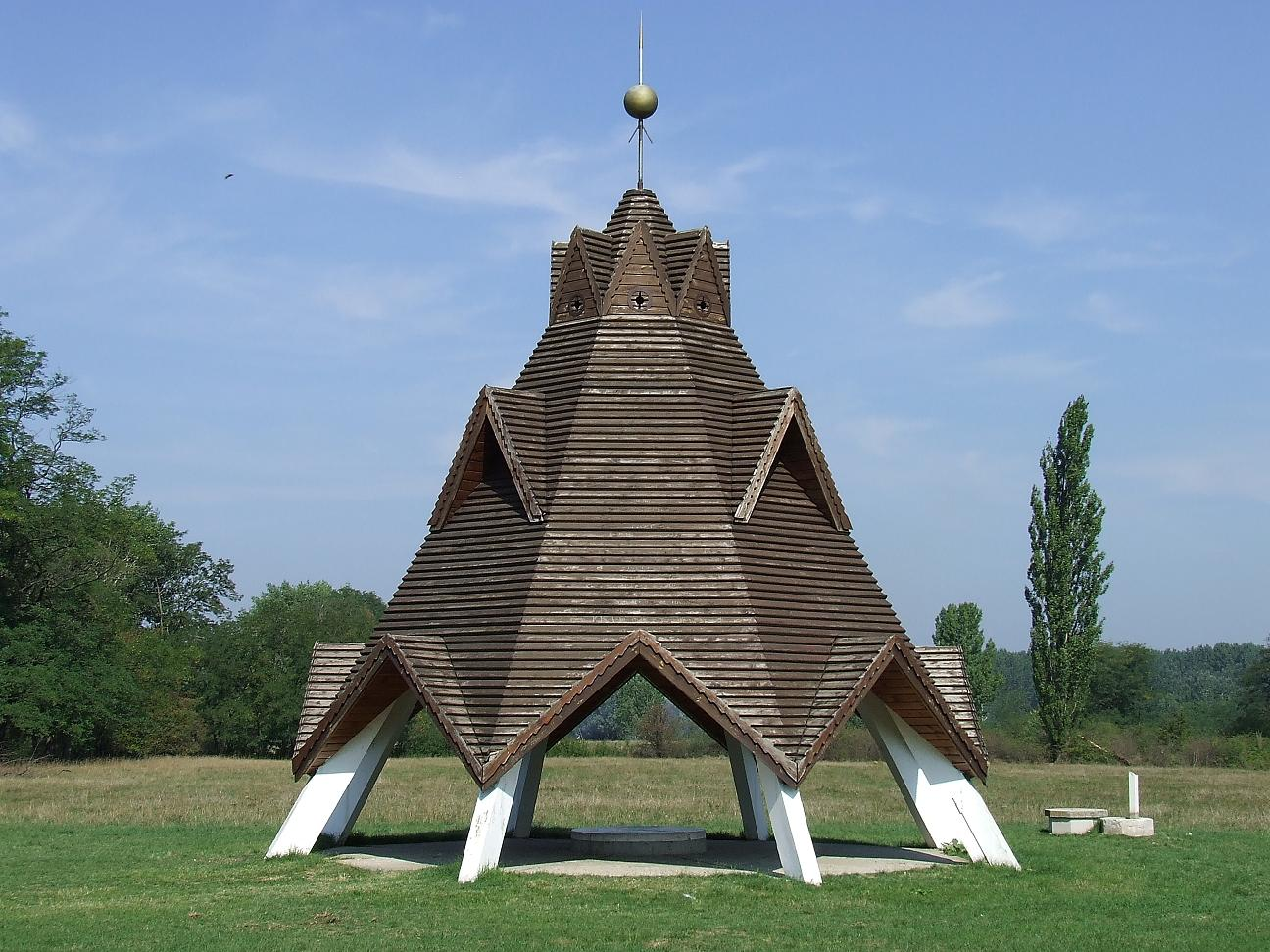
- Monument to the geographical center of Hungary

- Flag Coat of arms
- Interactive map of Pusztavacs
- Country: Hungary
- Region: Central Hungary
- County: Pest
- District: Dabas District

Area
  - Total: 79.07 km^{2} (30.53 sq mi)

Population (1 January 2024)
  - Total: 1,279
  - Density: 16.18/km^{2} (41.89/sq mi)
- Area code: +36 29

Pusztavacs is a village in Dabas district, Pest county, Hungary, about 54 km south-east of the capital Budapest. Its population consists of 1,530 inhabitants. Pusztavacs was first mentioned in records in 1274. It is notable for featuring the geographical centre of the country. To mark that centre, an 11-meter high octagonal pyramid was built in 1978 by the plans of the architect József Kerényi. The tower was burnt down in 2001 and later rebuilt in 2004.

Some sights include ruins of a 15th-century church of Saint Augustine and a memorial to the 13 martyrs of Arad.
