= Kakucs =

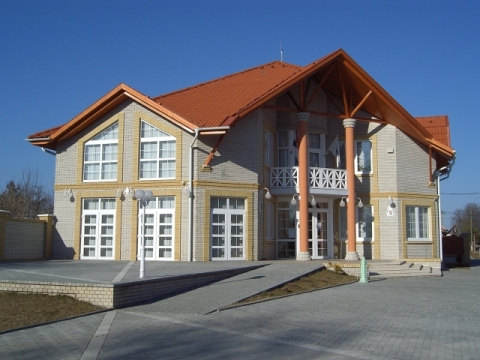
- Village hall

- Coat of arms

- Location of Kakucs in Hungary
- Coordinates: 47.24113°N 19.36448°E
- Country: Hungary
- Region: Central Hungary
- County: Pest
- Subregion: Dabasi
- Rank: Village

Area
  - Total: 21.80 km^{2} (8.42 sq mi)

Population (1 January 2008)
  - Total: 2,731
  - Density: 125.3/km^{2} (324.5/sq mi)
- Time zone: UTC+1 (CET)
  - Summer (DST): UTC+2 (CEST)
- Postal code: 2366
- Area code: +36 29
- KSH code: 32230
- Website: www.kakucs.hu

Kakucs is a village in Pest county, Hungary.
