= Újlengyel =

Coordinates: 47°13′43″N 19°27′08″E

- Country: Hungary
- Region: Central Hungary
- County: Pest

Újlengyel is a village and commune in the comitatus of Pest in Hungary.

== Archaeology ==
In 2019, 150 ancient coins were discovered by archaeologists buried in the ground. In January 2021, a stash of four gold and 7,000 silver coins dated back to the 16th century were revealed by researchers led by numismatist Balázs Nagy on a farm during the two-day expedition. According to the statement released by the Museum, gold coins were issued during the reign of Matthias I, and the rare silver coin was issued by Pope Pius who ruled between 1458 and 1464.
