= Örkény =

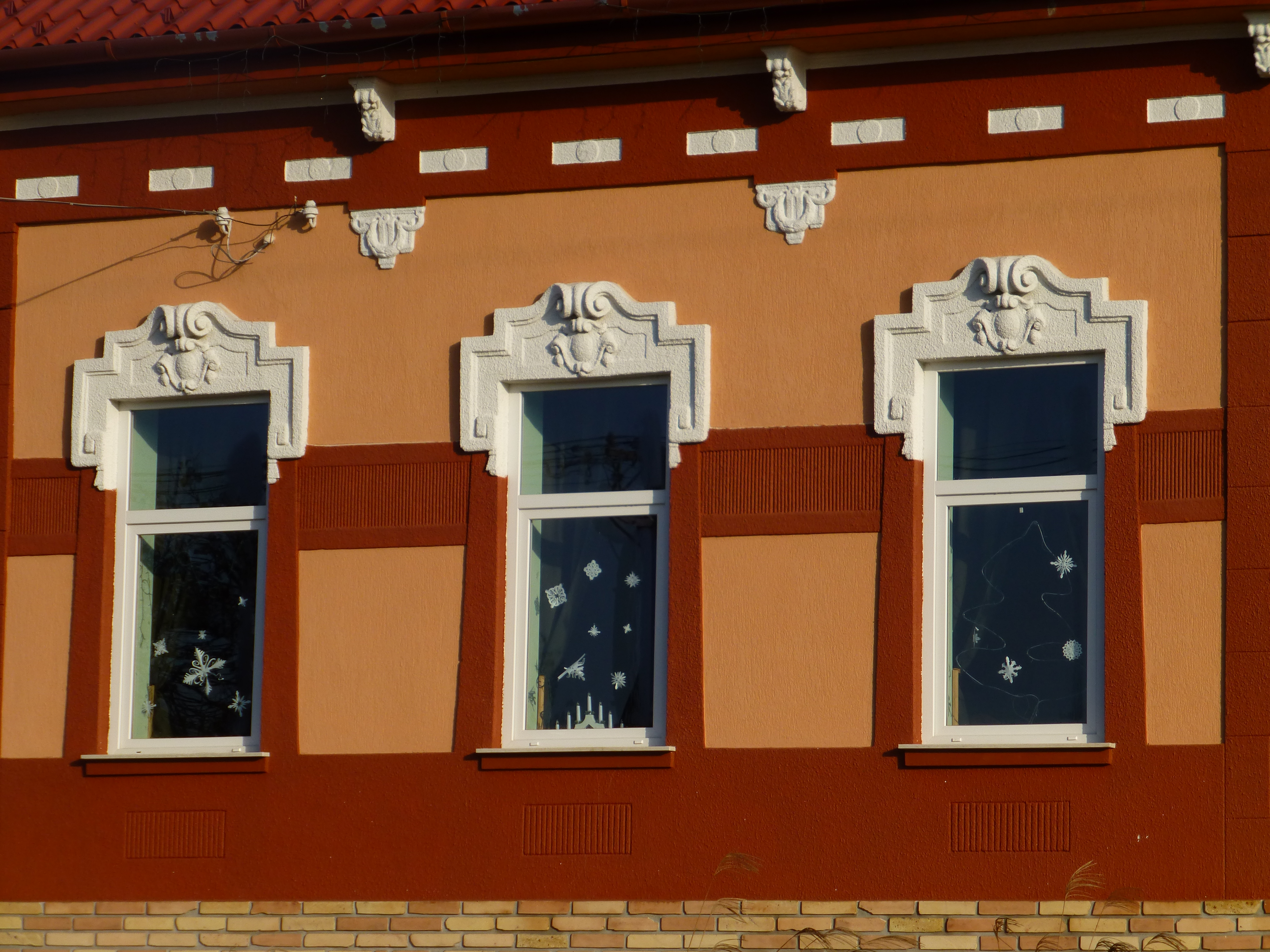
- Windows on a house of Örkény

- Flag Coat of arms

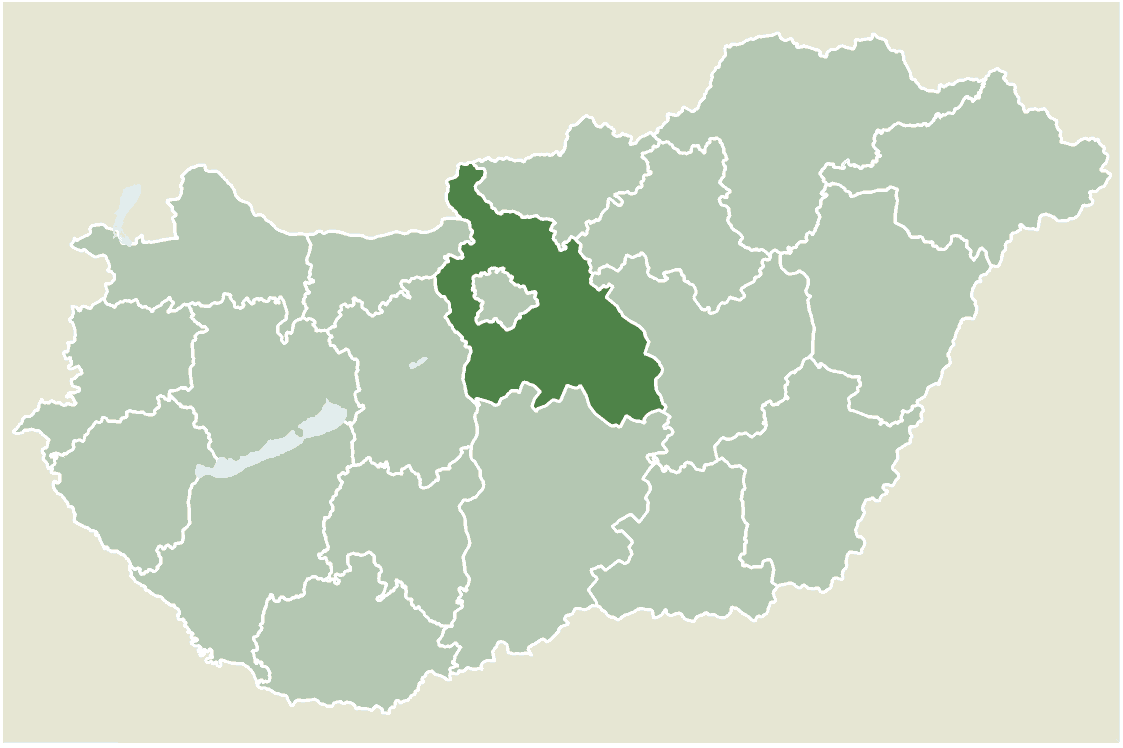
- Location of Pest county in Hungary

- Location of Örkény
- Coordinates: 47.12905°N 19.43237°E
- Country: Hungary
- County: Pest

Area
  - Total: 36.44 km^{2} (14.07 sq mi)

Population (2015)
  - Total: 4,810
  - Density: 132/km^{2} (342/sq mi)
- Time zone: UTC+1 (CET)
  - Summer (DST): UTC+2 (CEST)
- Postal code: 2377
- Area code: 29

Örkény is a small town in Pest county, Hungary, 50 km (31 mi) south of Budapest.

== History ==
The mediaeval village was formed beside the ancient Pest-Constantinople highway. Today this is one of the most important roads of Hungary (Route 5). Örkény appeared in the royal charters in the 15th century under the name Ewrkyn or Ewrken (the origin of the name is uncertain).

The village was destroyed in the early days of the Ottoman rule, and remained deserted until the 18th century because of the constant wars and looting armies.

In 1784 a new era began with colonising efforts of Prince Antal Grassalkovich who built a small manor house, and distributed parcels and lots to the new inhabitants. In 1848 the St. Leopold Church was built in elegant Neoclassical style (today it's a national monument). In 1888 the estate was inherited by István Pálóczi Horváth. The new owner has done a lot for the development of the village: he established the famous School of Agriculture, distributed lots to the landless peasants and planted new orchards and vineyards. The Pálóczi Horváth Mansion was built in 1893 (today it is a cultural and community centre).

In the 20th century Örkény was transformed by the rapid economical development, the mechanisation of the agriculture and the slow urbanization. This was marked in the 1980s by the building of the new primary school and the health care centre. Örkény became a town in 2005.

There is a motor racing circuit near the town, named the EuroRing. It was featured in the racing simulator rFactor.
