= Tatárszentgyörgy =

- Flag Coat of arms

- Location of Tatárszentgyörgy in Hungary
- Coordinates: 47°4′53.40″N 19°22′10.81″E
- Country: Hungary
- Region: Central Hungary
- County: Pest
- Subregion: Dabasi
- Rank: Village

Area
  - Total: 55.06 km^{2} (21.26 sq mi)

Population (1 January 2008)
  - Total: 1,960
  - Density: 35.6/km^{2} (92.2/sq mi)
- Time zone: UTC+1 (CET)
  - Summer (DST): UTC+2 (CEST)
- Postal code: 2375
- Area code: +36 29
- KSH code: 27386
- Website: www.tatarszentgyorgy.hu

Tatárszentgyörgy is a village in Pest county, Hungary.
