= Újhartyán =

- Flag Coat of arms

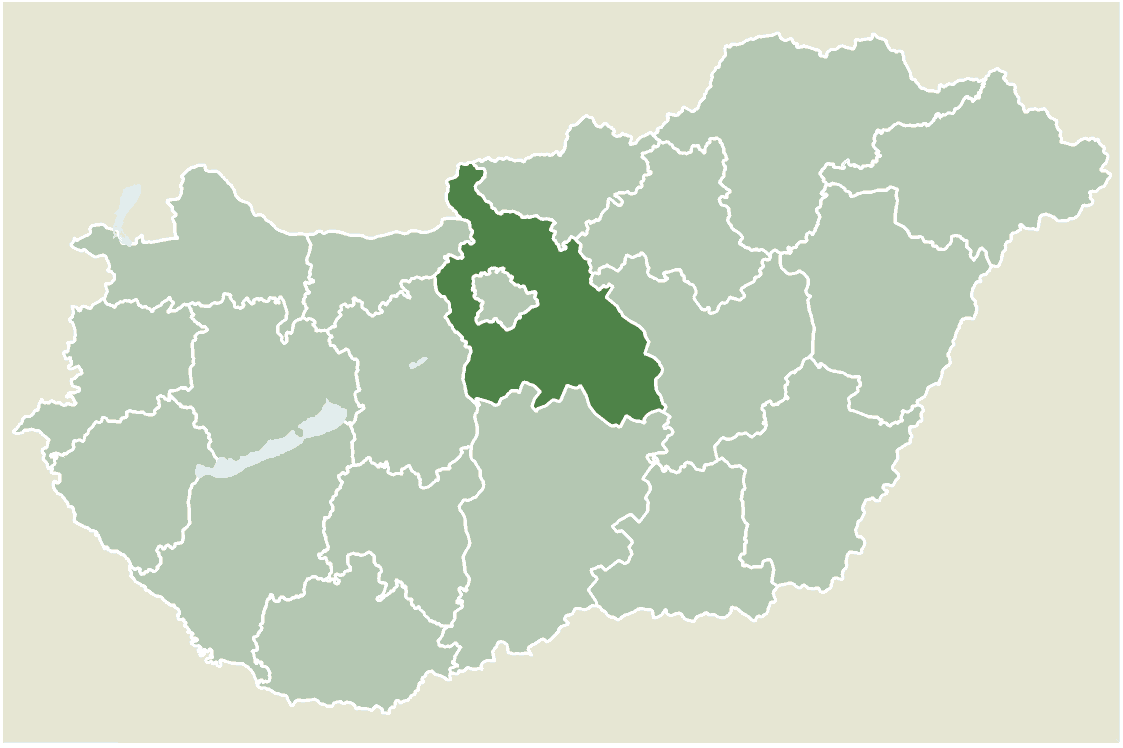
- Location of Pest county in Hungary

- Location of Újhartyán
- Coordinates: 47.21991°N 19.39111°E
- Country: Hungary
- County: Pest

Area
  - Total: 22.43 km^{2} (8.66 sq mi)

Population (2014)
  - Total: 2,721
  - Density: 123.05/km^{2} (318.7/sq mi)
- Time zone: UTC+1 (CET)
  - Summer (DST): UTC+2 (CEST)
- Postal code: 2367
- Area code: 29

Újhartyán (German: Hartian) is a town in Pest County, Hungary.

== Sights ==
- There is a Roman Catholic church in the main street.
