= Ócsa =

- Town
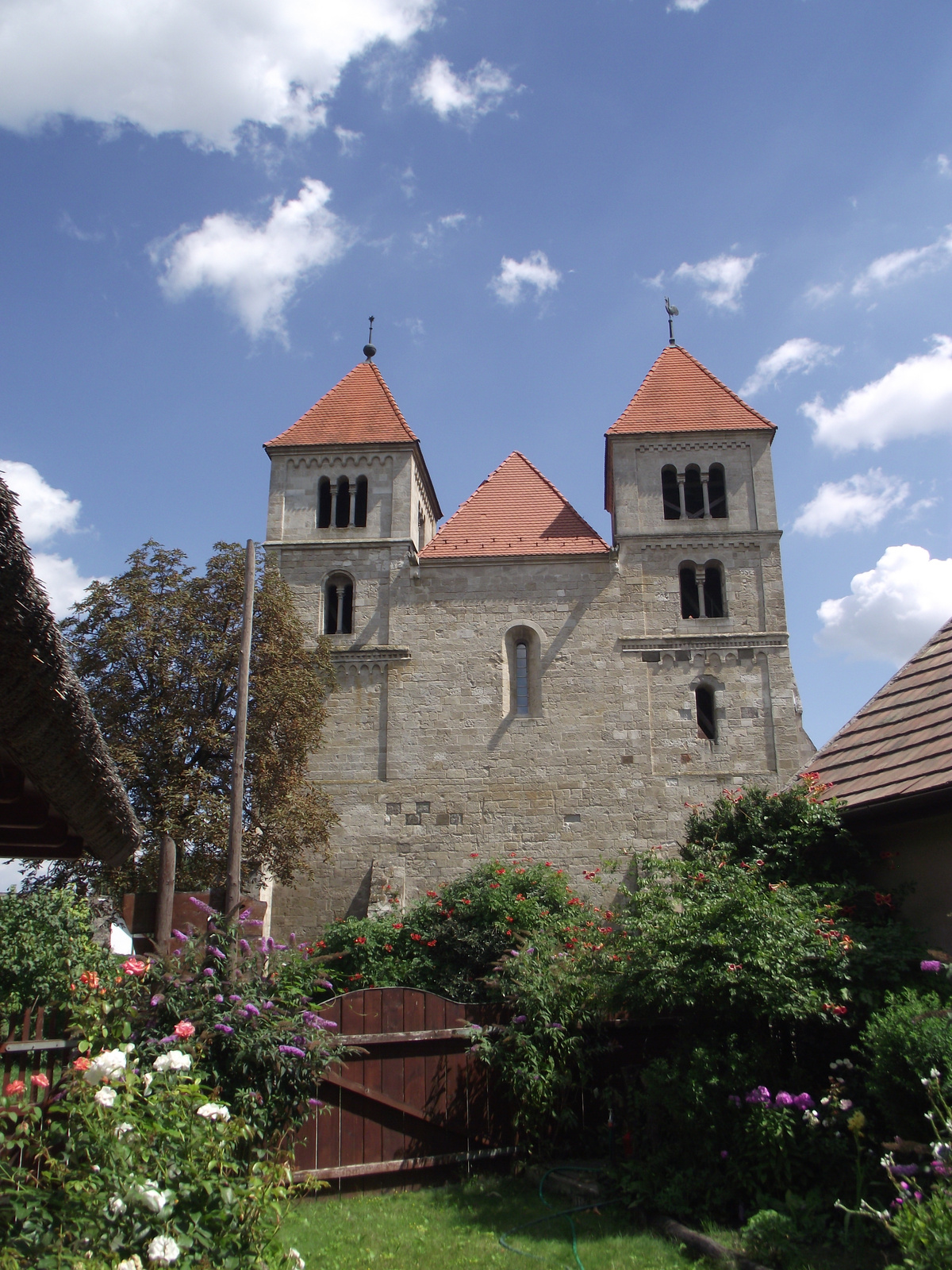
- Ócsa

- Flag Coat of arms

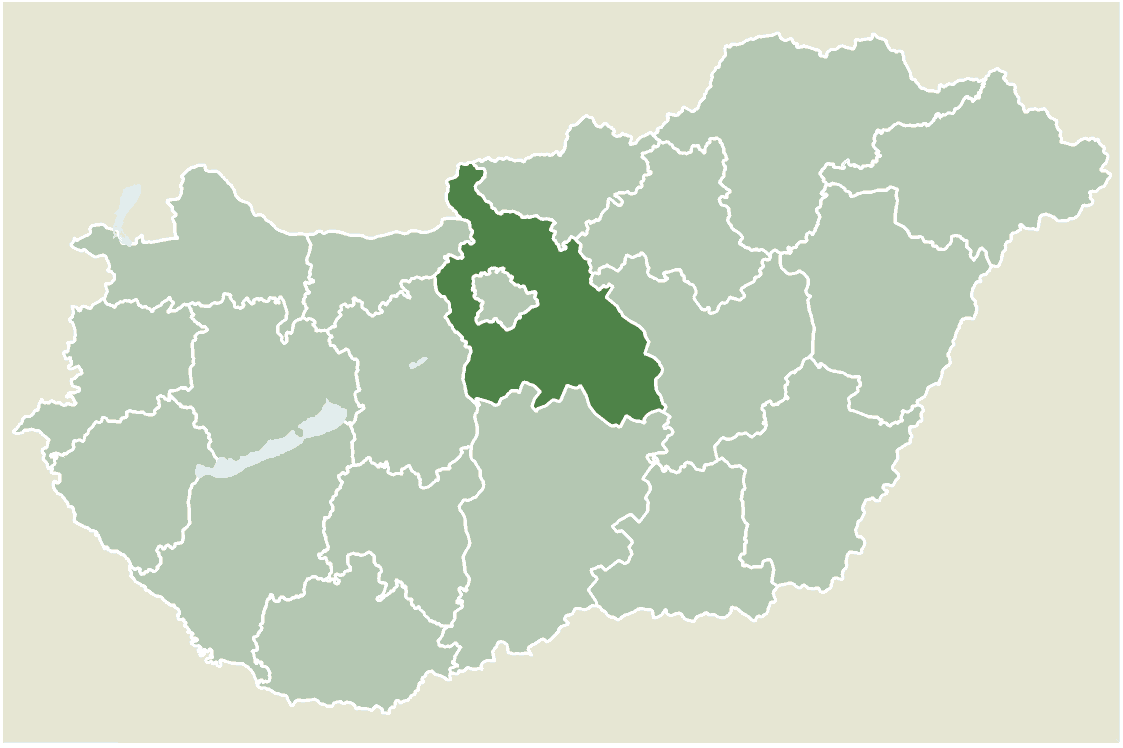
- Location of Pest county in Hungary

- Location of Ócsa
- Coordinates: 47.29341°N 19.22598°E
- Country: Hungary
- County: Pest
- District: Gyál

Area
  - Total: 81.64 km^{2} (31.52 sq mi)

Population (2007)
  - Total: 8,953
  - Density: 108.68/km^{2} (281.5/sq mi)
- Time zone: UTC+1 (CET)
  - Summer (DST): UTC+2 (CEST)
- Postal code: 2364
- Area code: (+36) 29
- Website: ocsa.hu

Ócsa is a town in Pest county, Budapest metropolitan area, Hungary. It is situated 30 kilometers south of Budapest.

== Árpád Age Romanesque church ==
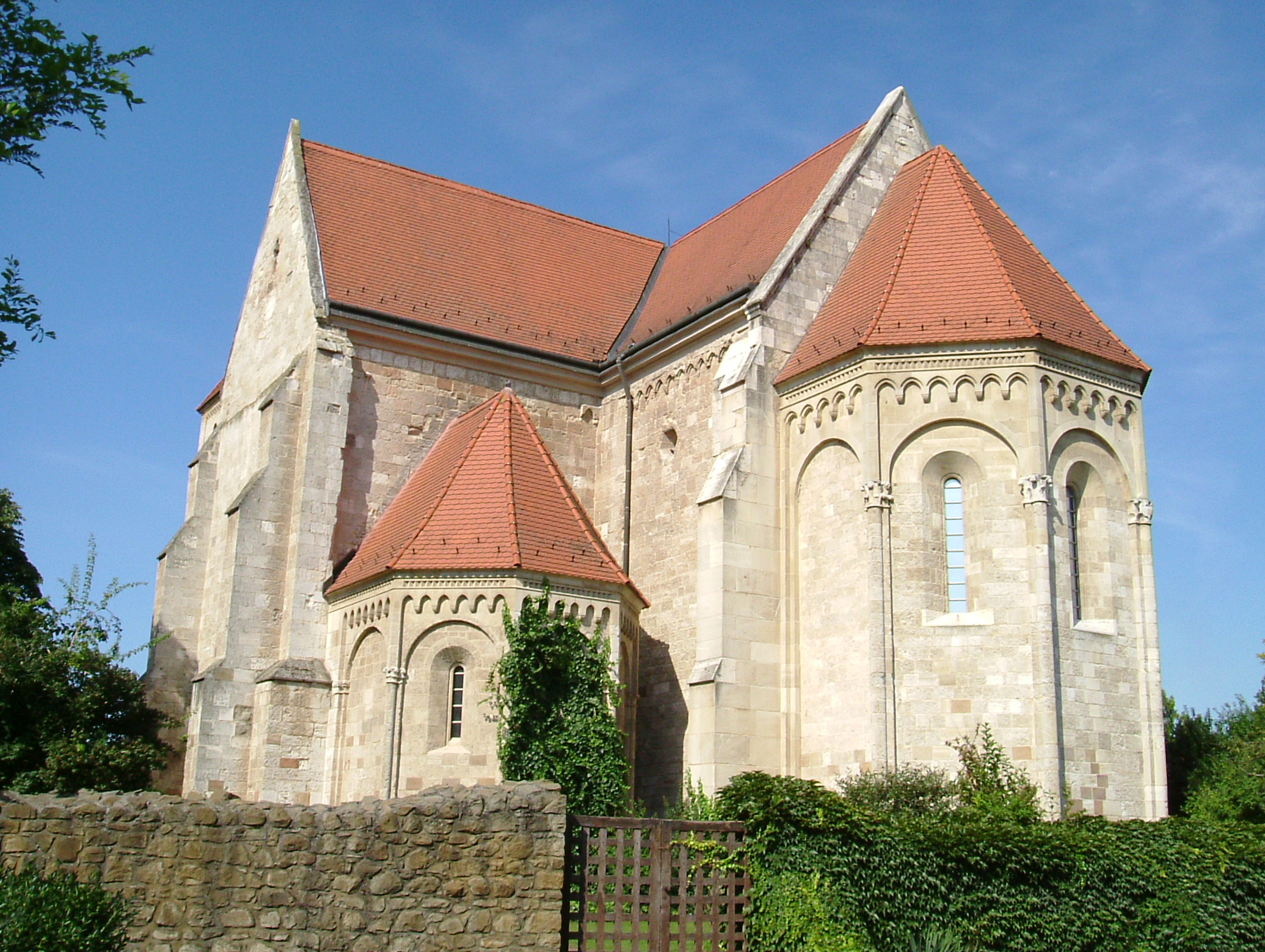
The 13. C. Romanesque monastery church of Ócsa.

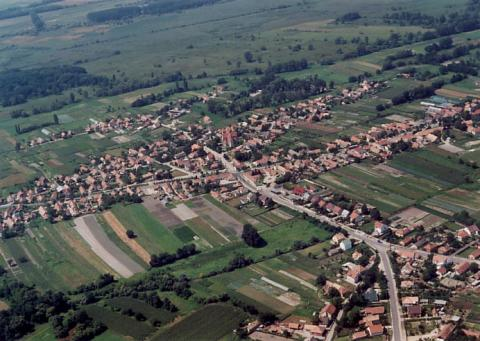
Aerial photograph of Ócsa

The church was originally built in the 13th century by the Premonstratensians for use as a monastery. During the 16th century the village was reformed and the structure was given to the village for use as a public place of worship.

One of the most beautiful Romanesque churches preserved in Hungary, it has three naves, a cross nave, and two western towers, following the style common to Hungarian medieval architecture. It was renovated in the 20th century, according to the plans of modern-day architect Ernő Foerk. The church is interesting not only for its architecture, but for the murals of Saint Ladislaus I of Hungary, the Legendary painted on the northern walls.

Numerous preserved houses and structures in the vicinity recall the life and times of the Hungarian medieval age, including tools, furniture, and other objects of interest.

== Bird observatory ==
A long-standing bird observatory known as the Ócsai Madárvárta is located nearby.

== Notable residents ==
- Tamás Csilus, footballer.

== Twin towns – sister cities ==
Ócsa is twinned with:

- Dalgety Bay and Hillend, Scotland, United Kingdom
- Kose, Estonia
- Plášťovce, Slovakia
