= Dabas, Hungary =

Dabas
- Town
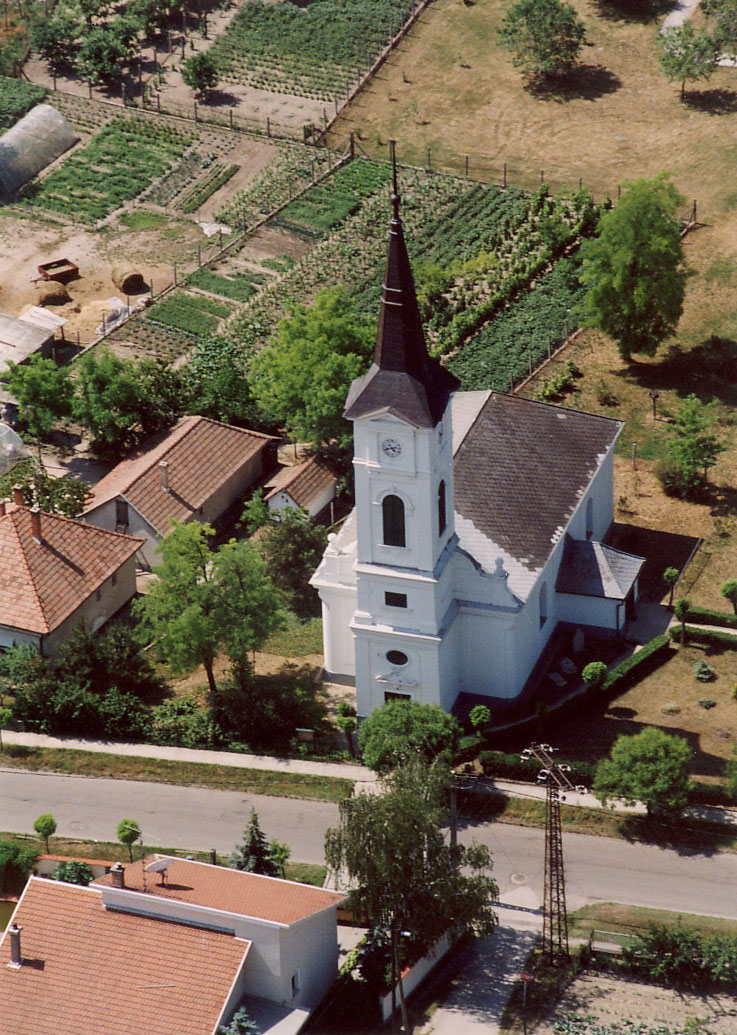
- Reformed church in Dabas

- Flag Coat of arms

- Location of in Hungary
- Coordinates: 47.18900°N 19.31257°E
- Country: Hungary
- County: Pest
- District: Dabas

Area
  - Total: 165.99 km^{2} (64.09 sq mi)

Population (2004)
  - Total: 16,093
  - Density: 96.952/km^{2} (251.10/sq mi)
- Time zone: UTC+1 (CET)
  - Summer (DST): UTC+2 (CEST)
- Postal code: 2370
- Area code: (+36) 29
- Website: www.dabas.hu

Dabas (Hungarian pronunciation: [ˈdɒbɒʃ]; German: Dabotz) is a town in Pest County, Hungary, and the center of a microregion. It has a population of 17,000.

== History ==
The town consists of four different parts: Upper Dabas, Lower Dabas, Gyón and Sári. The village of Dabas was already a populous settlement in 1270, but in the Ottoman era the whole region became totally deserted. In the 18th century four new villages were created by the owners of the territory. The inhabitants of Upper-Dabas were catholic Hungarian serfs, Lower-Dabas was the centre of the lower nobility (especially the famous and populous Halász family), Sári (Šari) was populated by catholic Slovak colonists and Gyón by Reformed Hungarians and Evangelical Slovaks. The Slovaks of Sári kept their national identity until the present. In the 19th century the nobility of Lower Dabas built several Neoclassical mansions – these are the main attractions of the town today. The two Dabas were united in 1947, and in 1966 the other two villages joined too. In the 1970s Dabas was urbanised and a modern town centre was built with a court house, public school, office blocks and a big department store. Dabas became a town in 1989.

== Main sights ==
Dabas is famous for the mansions of the lower nobility. The number of the national monuments from the 18th and 19th centuries is more than twenty. The most important of them is the big Neoclassical mansion of Móric Halász in Gyón and the Casino of the Nobles in Dabas. The Reformed Churches of Dabas and Gyón, the Evangelical Church of Gyón and the Catholic Churches of Dabas and Sári were built in the 18th century.

== Notable people ==
- László Kossuth, the father of the famous Hungarian statesman, Lajos Kossuth resided in Dabas. The Kossuth family's home is today a memorial museum
- Lajos Dinnyés, politician of the Smallholders Party, Prime Minister of Hungary between 31 May 1947 and 10 December 1948.
- Sándor Balogh, footballer who was part of the Golden Team of the 1950s.

== Sport ==
Dabas is home to association football clubs FC Dabas and Dabas–Gyón FC that currently play in the Nemzeti Bajnokság III.

== Twin towns – sister cities ==
Dabas is twinned with:

- Abrud, Romania
- Aiton, Romania
- Albenga, Italy
- Banská Bystrica, Slovakia
- Baraolt, Romania
- Budapest XV, Hungary
- Kalinkovo, Slovakia
- Mukachevo, Ukraine
- Senta, Serbia
- Staunton, United States
- Tržič, Slovenia
