= Central Hungary =

Coordinates: 47°28′19″N 19°03′01″E

Central Hungary Közép-Magyarország
- Region
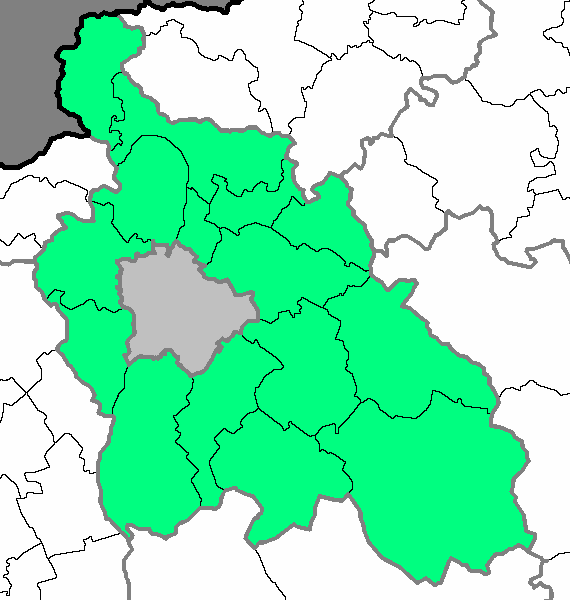
- Country: Hungary
- Capital city: Budapest

Area
  - Total: 6,391 km^{2} (2,468 sq mi)

Population (2021)
  - Total: 1,309,802
  - Density: 204.9/km^{2} (530.8/sq mi)

GDP
  - Total: €98.644 billion (2023)
  - Per capita: €32,750 (2023)
- Time zone: UTC+1 (CET)
  - Summer (DST): UTC+2 (CEST)
- NUTS code: HU1, HU10
- HDI (2022): 0.934 very high · 1st

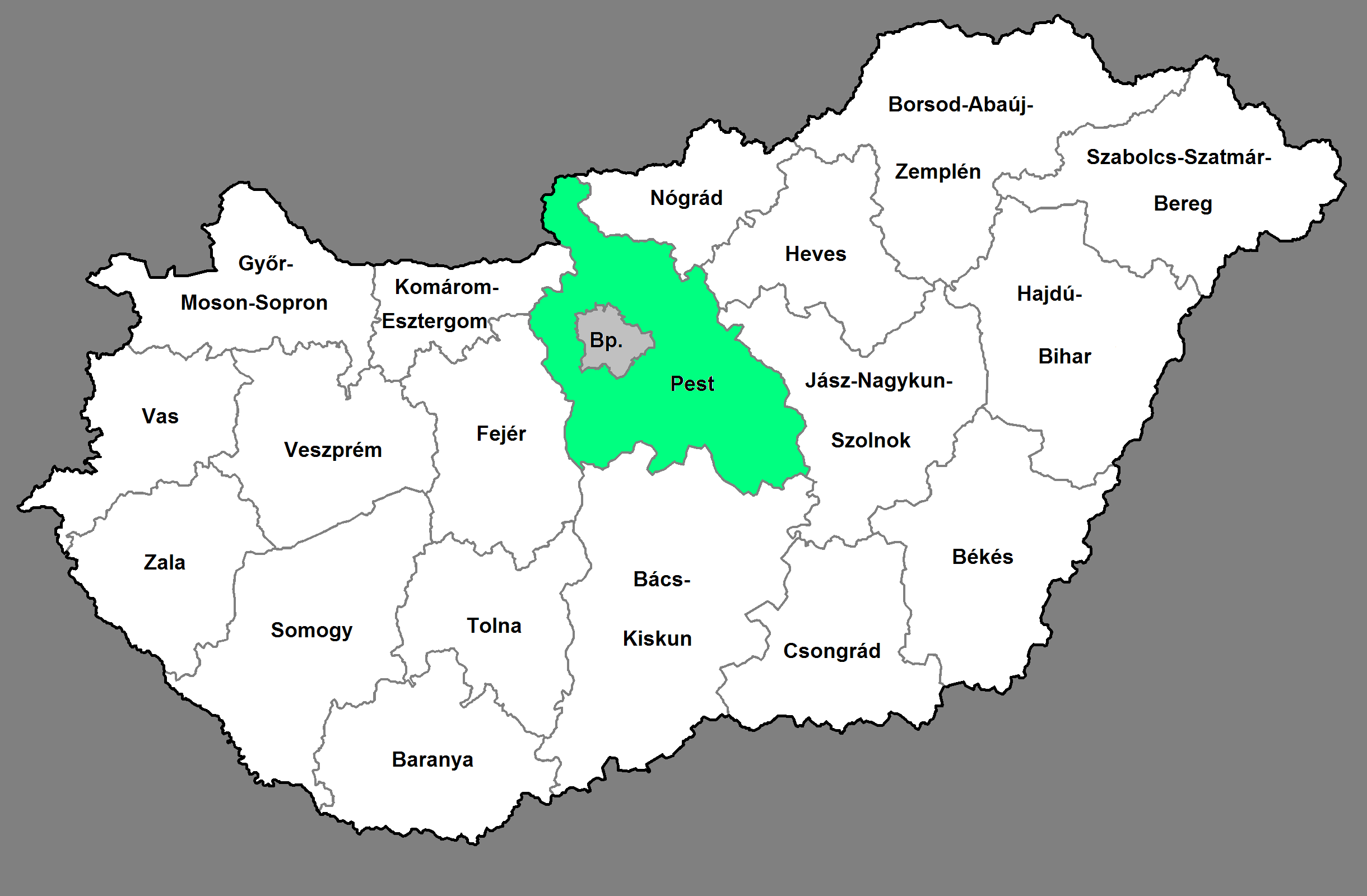
Location of Central Hungary region within Hungary

Central Hungary (Hungarian: Közép-Magyarország pronounced [ˈkøzeːp ˈmɒɟɒrorsaːɡ]) is one of the eight statistical regions in Hungary (NUTS 1 and NUTS 2). It includes Pest County and since 2018 no longer includes Budapest, the capital of the region.

== Administration ==
Central Hungary's subregions (population figures from the Hungarian Central Statistical Office as of 2009)

=== Pest County ===
Subregion	Seat	Area	Population	Number of settlements
Aszód	Aszód	241.41 km^{2} (93.21 sq mi)	35,451	9
Budaörs	Budaörs	240.36 km^{2} (92.80 sq mi)	85,115	10
Cegléd	Cegléd	1,234.00 km^{2} (476.45 sq mi)	121,149	15
Dabas	Dabas	498.68 km^{2} (192.54 sq mi)	44,183	10
Dunakeszi	Dunakeszi	125.17 km^{2} (48.33 sq mi)	79,123	4
Érd	Érd	117.95 km^{2} (45.54 sq mi)	99,536	4
Gödöllő	Gödöllő	380.88 km^{2} (147.06 sq mi)	104,471	12
Gyál	Gyál	286.54 km^{2} (110.63 sq mi)	45,944	5
Monor	Monor	449.62 km^{2} (173.60 sq mi)	110,287	15
Nagykáta	Nagykáta	711.85 km^{2} (274.85 sq mi)	76,909	16
Pilisvörösvár	Pilisvörösvár	245.44 km^{2} (94.76 sq mi)	66,702	14
Ráckeve	Ráckeve	628.33 km^{2} (242.60 sq mi)	141,756	20
Szentendre	Szentendre	326.58 km^{2} (126.09 sq mi)	77,676	13
Szob	Szob	314.73 km^{2} (121.52 sq mi)	12,605	13
Vác	Vác	431.81 km^{2} (166.72 sq mi)	70,558	19
Veresegyház	Veresegyház	159.79 km^{2} (61.70 sq mi)	36,793	8

== Demography ==
- Total population 1,325,036 (2021)
  - 17% aged 0–14 years
  - 65% aged 15–64 years
  - 18% aged 65 and over

== Economy ==
Central Hungary is the richest and most developed region of the country. The unemployment rate stood at 2.7% in 2017 and was much lower than the national and the European average.

Year	2006	2007	2008	2009	2010	2011	2012	2013	2014	2015	2016	2017
unemployment rate (in %)	5.1%	4.8%	4.5%	6.5%	8.9%	9.0%	9.5%	8.7%	6.2%	5.3%	3.8%	2.7%

== Tourism ==
Central Hungary is part of the Budapest Central Transdanubia Tourist Region.

=== Budapest ===
In 1987 a World Heritage Site was declared which includes Buda Castle, the Danube Riverbank, the Andrássy Avenue and its historic surroundings, the Millennium Underground Railway and Heroes' Square.

Other important landmarks in Buda are the Gellért Hill and the tomb of Gül Baba and Rudas Baths built during the Ottoman rule of Hungary, ruins of Old Buda, the Coliseum in Nagyszombat Street and the ruins of Aquincum. In the Buda Hills are the Chairlift, the Children's railway and caves with stalagmites and stalactites.

The most important landmarks in Pest are the Hungarian Parliament Building, the St. Stephen's Basilica, the Inner City Parish Church, the Hungarian Academy of Sciences, the Vigadó Concert Hall, the Hungarian National Museum, the New York Palace on the Small Boulevard, the Dohány Street Synagogue, the Grand Boulevard, and the Museum of Applied Arts.

Other important displays are at the Museum of Fine Arts, the Hungarian National Gallery, the Ethnographic Museum, the Budapest History Museum and Statue Park.

Important landmarks are Budapest's oldest bridges, such as the Széchenyi Chain Bridge, the Margaret Bridge, the Liberty Bridge. The biggest parks are very popular, especially the City Park with Vajdahunyad Castle, the Széchenyi thermal bath, the Budapest Zoo and Botanical Garden and the Margaret Island. Budapest is world-famous for its hot spas too.

Budapest holds many perennial events, for example Budapest Fair, Fireworks and Budapest Parade.

=== Pest County ===
Places of interest in Pest County are Gödöllő (Royal Castle and Arboretum), Ráckeve (Serbian cathedral and Savoya Castle), Szentendre (Baroque town square, Margit Kovács Museum, Ethnographic Open Air Museum), Vác (cathedral, triumphal arch) and Visegrád (Visegrád Castle).

Other landmarks are the church (built in the Middle Ages) in Zsámbék, the Reformed church of the Holy Roman Empire, the church in Fót in the Romantic style, Apaj plain, ancient juniper fields in Tatárszentgyörgy, equestrianism in Pusztavacs, Attila Rise in Tápiószentmárton, the arboretum in Vácrátót and the bear sanctuary in Veresegyház.

The Pilis Mountains offer plenty of opportunities for hiking. There are also the Visegrád Hills, Ördögmalom waterfall, Gödöllő National Park and Ócsa National Park.

== See also ==
- List of regions of Hungary
