= Schola Medica Salernitana =

First medical school in Europe

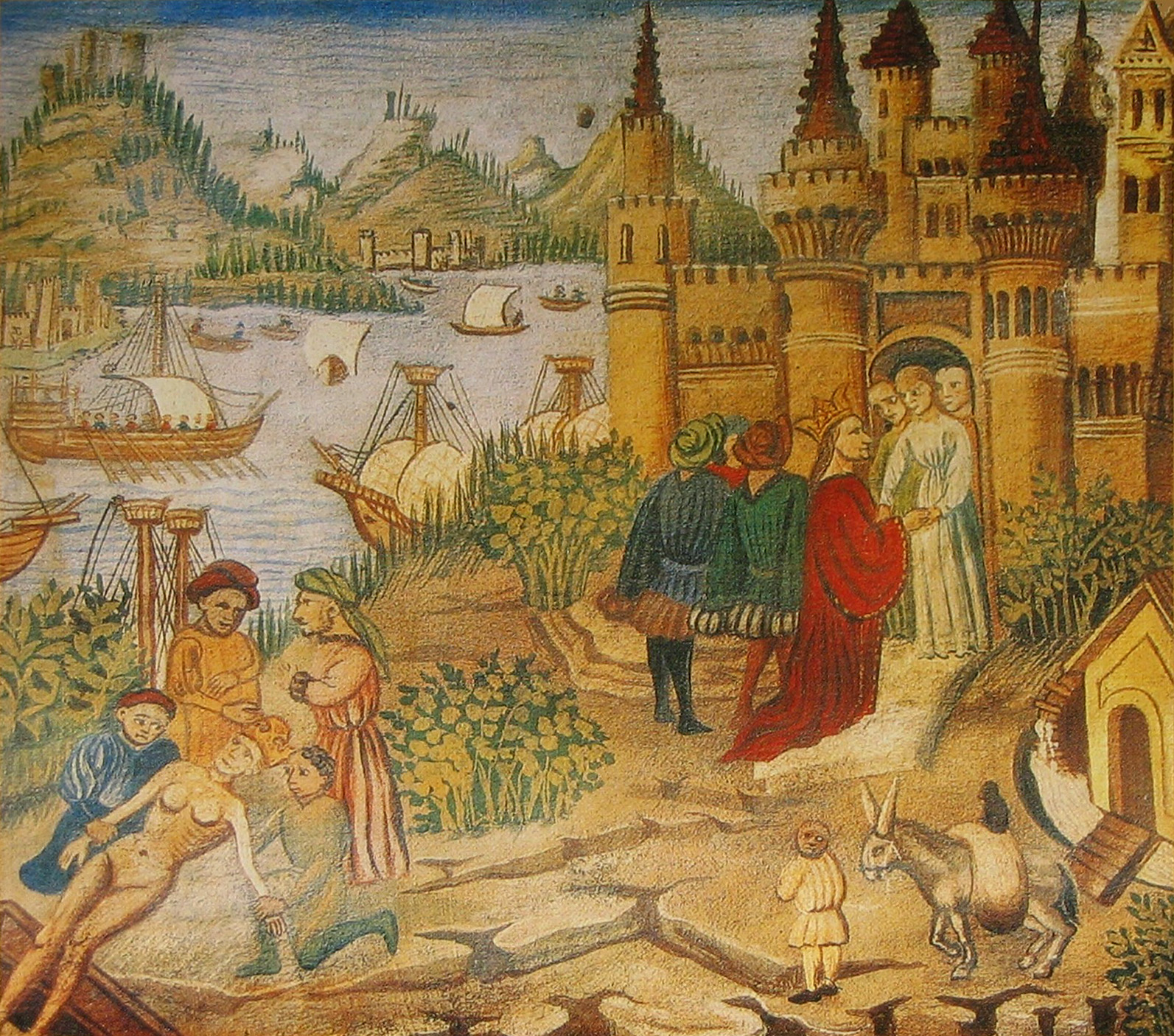
A miniature depicting the Schola Medica Salernitana from a copy of Avicenna's Canons

The Schola Medica Salernitana (Italian: Scuola Medica Salernitana) was a medieval medical school, the first and most important of its kind. Situated on the Tyrrhenian Sea in the south Italian city of Salerno, it was founded in the 9th century and rose to prominence in the 10th century, becoming the most important source of medical knowledge in Western Europe at the time.

Arabic medical treatises, both those that were translations of Greek texts and those that were originally written in Arabic, had accumulated in the library of Montecassino, where they were translated into Latin; thus the received lore of Hippocrates, Galen and Dioscorides was supplemented and invigorated by Arabic medical practice, known from contacts with Sicily and North Africa. As a result, the medical practitioners of Salerno, both men and women, were unrivaled in the medieval Western Mediterranean for practical concerns.

== Overview ==
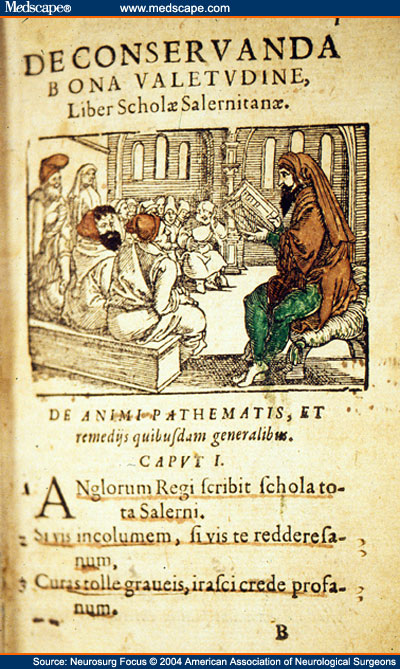
Constantine the African lecturing to the school of Salerno

Founded in the 9th century, the school was originally based in the dispensary of a monastery. It achieved its greatest celebrity between the tenth and thirteenth centuries, from the last decades of Lombard power, during which its fame began to spread more than locally, to the fall of the Hohenstaufen. The arrival in Salerno of Constantine Africanus in 1077 marked the beginning of Salerno's classic period. Through the encouragement of Alfano I, Archbishop of Salerno and translations of Constantine Africanus, Salerno gained the title of "Town of Hippocrates" (Hippocratica Civitas or Hippocratica Urbs). People from all over the world flocked to the "Schola Salerni", both the sick, in the hope of recovering, and students, to learn the art of medicine.

The school was based on the synthesis of the Greek-Latin tradition supplemented by notions from Arab and Jewish cultures. The approach was based on the practice and culture of prevention rather than cure, thus opening the way for the empirical method in medicine.

== Legend of the foundation ==
The foundation of the school is traditionally linked to an event narrated by a legend. It is reported that a Greek pilgrim named Pontus had stopped in the city of Salerno and found shelter for the night under the arches of the Arcino aqueduct. There was a thunderstorm and an Italian traveller, named Salernus, wandered into the same place. He was hurt and the Greek, at first suspicious, approached to look closely at the dressings that the Latin applied to his wound. Meanwhile, two other travellers, the Jew Helinus and the Arab Abdela had come. They also showed interest in the wound and at the end it was discovered that all four were dealing with medicine. They then decided to create a partnership and to give birth to a school where their knowledge could be collected and disseminated.

== The first period: 9th–10th centuries ==
The origins of the "School" should date back to the 9th century, though the documentation for this first period is rather poor. Little is known about the nature, lay or monastic, of doctors who were part of it, and it is unclear whether the "School" already had an institutionalized organization.

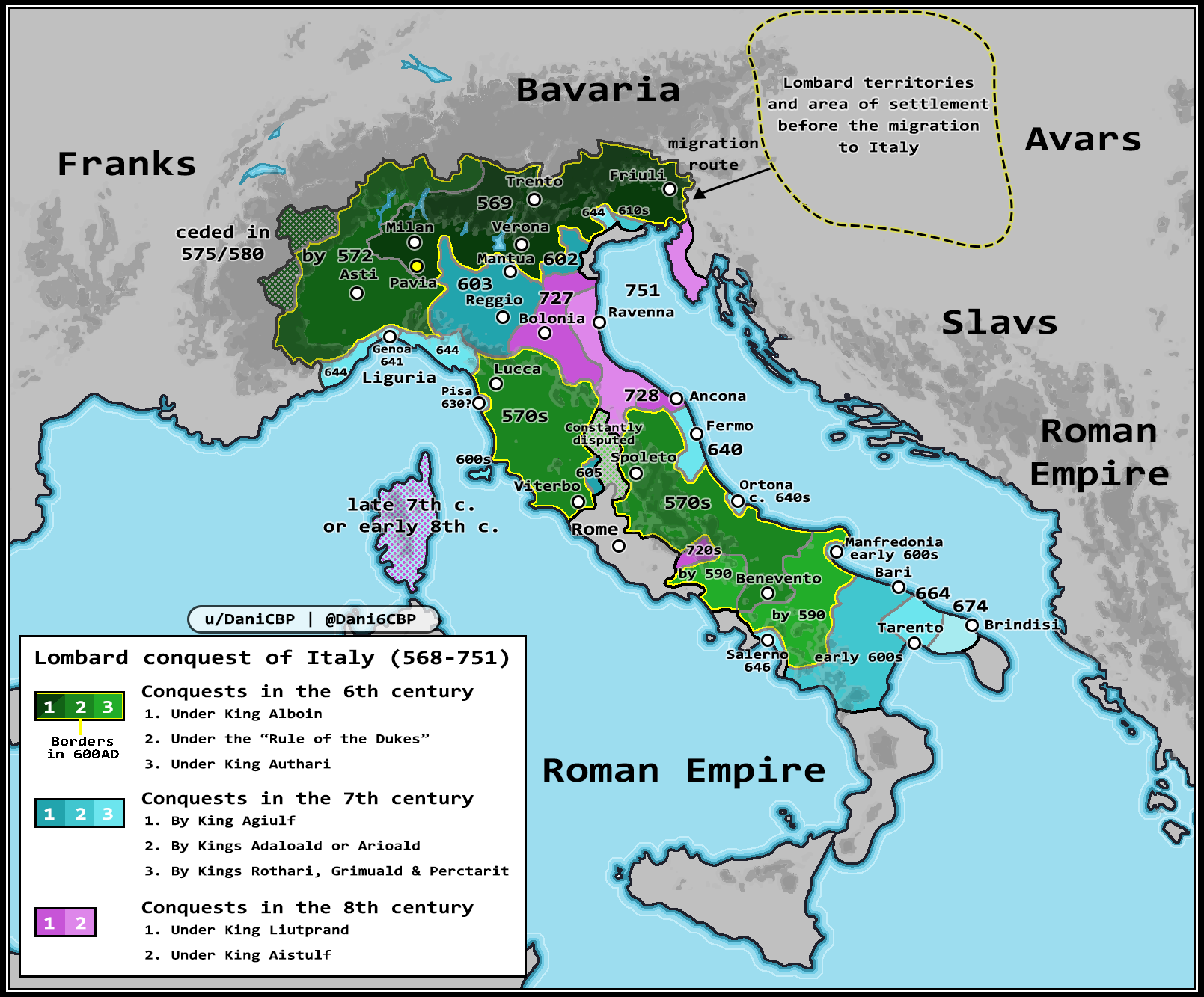
Lombard Conquest of Italy

In 568 AD, King Alboin brought the Langobards to Italy, where they gained power and control. They remained in power until the late 700s when the Normans took control of the area. In the mid 750's, many wealthy Langobards pursued religion and became monks, which led to a large amount of new clergy present. This caused a change in how the monasteries functioned, moving them away from strictly religious institutions to cultural and political ones. At this point in time, there was also a shift in the occupations of the monks themselves, where they moved from transcribing older medical texts to applying the knowledge more. During this time, the Langobardian monks, most notably Gariopontus, began to include a much larger level of detail in their records of illnesses, which helped them better understand the diseases they were treating people for.

Antonio Mazza dates the foundation of the school in 802. With that being stated, there is a greater amount of information that comes into play about the timeline of Schola Medica Salernitana from the 10th century. A German document written by Richer of Reims and an anonymous chronist of the Bishop of Verdun from the late 10th century says that Salerno from 985 and forwards, was known as a renowned center of medicine, and based on the time frame they believed that Salerno had taken around ten to twenty years to develop that prestige and reputation. Historians generally agree that Schola Medica Salernitana has been around since the 9th century but seems to have started to gain a reputation during the 10th century. The Historia inventionis ac translationis et miracula Sanctae Trophimenae chronicle narrates that in the period in which Pulcari was prefect of Amalfi (867–878 c.) a young woman by the name of Theodonanda fell seriously ill. Her husband and relatives took her to Salerno to be treated by the great archiater Hyerolamus, who visits her and consults a great amount of books ("immensa volumina librorum").

From the 9th century there was a great legal culture in Salerno as well as the existence of lay teachers and an ecclesiastical school. Alongside the masters of the law there were also those who cared for the body and taught the dogmas of the art of health. By the 10th century the city of Salerno was already very famous for its healthy climate and its doctors, and the fame of the medical school had reached northern Europe. We are told that "they were devoid of literary culture but provided with great experience and innate talent", and their fame was based more on their practical, observational, and experimental knowledge of medicine and successful cures rather than from ancient books and learning. In 988, Adalbero II of Verdun went to Salerno to have himself cured by the famed Salerno physicians, as told in the Gesta episcoporum Virdunensium. Richerus tells the story of a Salernitan physician at the French court in 947, whose medical knowledge he describes rooted in practical experience rather than books. In his Historia Ecclesiastica, Orderic Vitalis (1075 – c. 1142) states that in Salerno "the most ancient school of medicine has long flourished".

== The second period: 11th–13th centuries ==
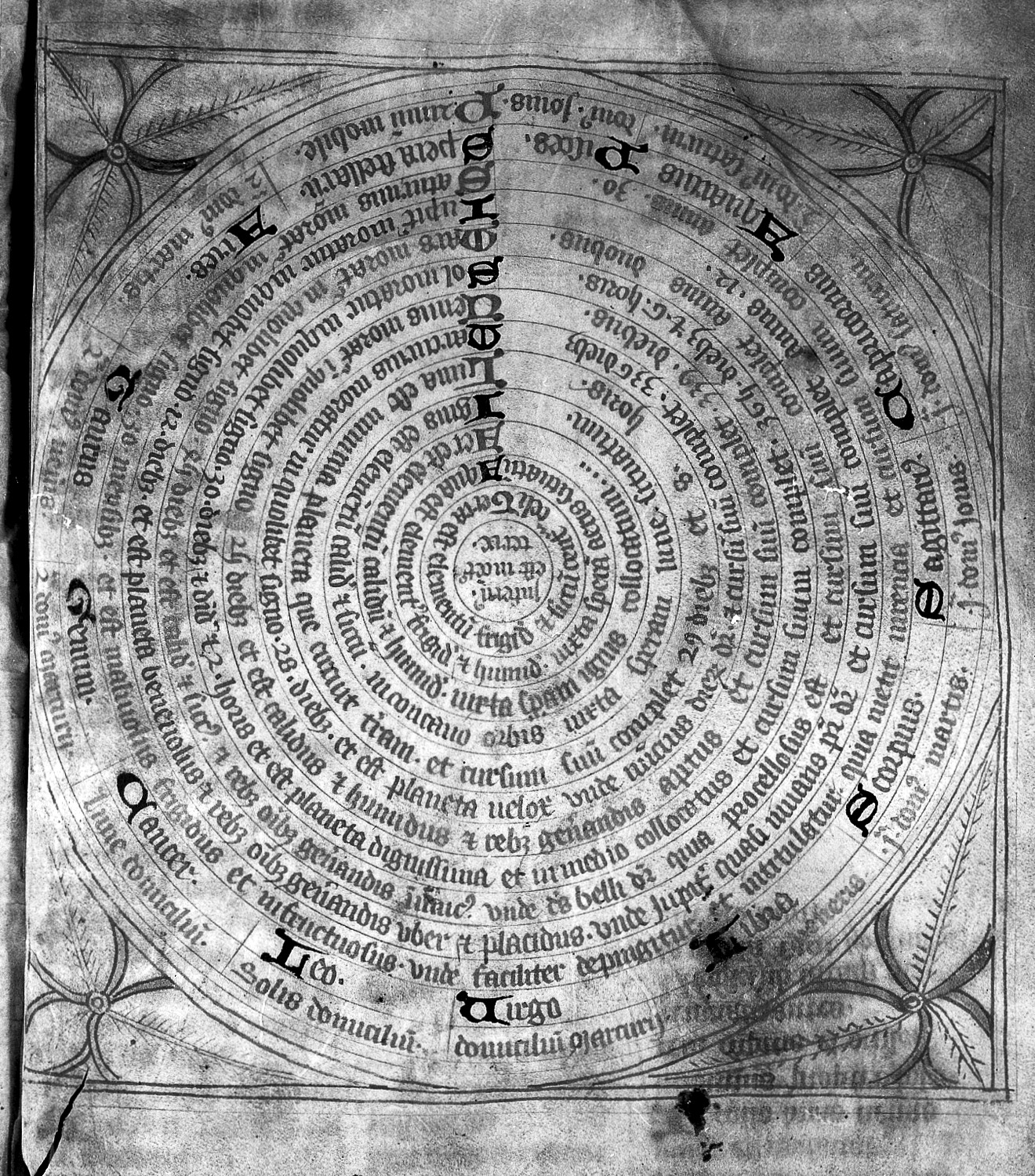
Planetary spheres, zodiac elements. From Miscellanea medica: collection of Salernitan medical works.

Geographic location certainly played a key role in the growth of the School: Salerno, a Mediterranean port, fused influences of Arab and Eastern Roman culture. The School bridged the Byzantine and Roman sects of Christianity, and it was very close to large groups of Muslim and Jewish people. There was a larger diversity of ideas and knowledge because of this, which helped to improve the teachings of the school. Books of Avicenna and Averroes arrived by sea, and the Carthaginian physician Constantine the African (or Ifrīqiya) who arrived in the city for several years came to Salerno and translated many texts from Arabic: Aphorisma and Prognostica of Hippocrates, Tegni and Megategni of Galen, Kitāb-al-malikī (i.e. Liber Regius, or Pantegni) of Alī ibn'Abbās (Haliy Abbas), the Viaticum of al-Jazzār (Algizar), the Liber divisionum and the Liber experimentorum of Rhazes (Razī), the Liber dietorum, Liber urinarium and the Liber febrium of Isaac Israel the Old (Isaac Iudaeus).

Johannes (d. February 2, 1161) and Matthaeus Platearius, possibly father and son, resided in Salerno at this time when they apparently published their famous "Liber de Simplici Medicina" (a.k.a. "Circa Instans") which is first recorded in Salerno under their name early in the 13th Century. Subsequent incarnations—c.1480 now found in Brussels; and in the early 1500s, published in Paris with art by Robinet Testard and now found in both Paris and St. Petersburg—bore the name "Livre des simples medecines". Facsimiles with commentary for both editions have been published by Opsomer and Stearn (1984) and by Moleiro (2001).

At this time classical monastic works were rediscovered. With the medical school's support, interest in medicine as a discipline was renewed.

Monks of Salerno and of the nearby Badia di Cava were of great importance in Benedictine geography, for we note in the city in the eleventh century the presence of three important figures of this order: Pope Gregory VII, the Abbot of Montecassino Desiderio (future Pope Victor III) and bishop Alfano I.

In this context, the "School" of Salerno grew until it became a point of attraction of both sick and students from all over Europe. The prestige of doctors in Salerno is largely witnessed by the chronicles of the time and the numerous manuscripts kept in the major European libraries.

In 1231, the authority of the school was sanctioned by Emperor Federico II. In his constitution of Melfi it was established that the activity of a doctor could only be carried out by doctors holding a diploma issued by the Medical School Salernitana. In 1280 Charles II of Anjou approved the first statute in which the School was recognized as a General Study in Medicine.

Its fame crossed borders, as proved by the Salernitan manuscripts kept in many European libraries, and by historical witnesses. The twelfth- or thirteenth-century author of the poem Regimen sanitatis Salernitanum gave a Salernitan provenance to his poem in order to advertise his work and give validity to it. The school kept the Greek-Latin medical tradition going, merging it with the Arab and Jewish medical traditions. The meeting of different cultures led to a synthesis and the comparison of different medical knowledge, as evidenced by a legend that ascribes the foundation of the school to four masters: the Jewish Helinus, the Greek Pontus, the Arab Abdela, and the Latin Salernus. In the school, besides the teaching of medicine (in which women too were involved, as both teachers and students), there were courses of philosophy, theology, and law.

The most famous female doctor and medical author at the school is Trota or Trotula de Ruggiero, who is accredited with several books on gynaecology and cosmetics, collectively known as The Trotula. De Passionibus Mulierum Curandorum was first published around 1100 AD and was a prominent text until a major revision by Louise Bourgoise, a midwife whose husband worked as assistant to Ambrose Paré in the early 1600s. A further 19 less definitive manuscripts by Trota can be found in European libraries today. She was very proficient in her recordings of cosmetics and medicinal plants, many of which are still used in the present. Some of these were common plants such as cinnamon, oats and walnuts, while others were minerals or animal byproducts. While there were some poisonous treatments for ailments and skincare, many of the products she used are still included in the cosmetic industry today. Some of these were cinnamon and clove as depilatories, saffron for gold hair dye, and violet oil for anti-ageing purposes. Additional women physicians who attended this school became known as the "Women of Salerno", or the mulieres Saleritanae, and included women such as Abella, Constance Calenda, Rebecca de Guarna, and Mercuriade.

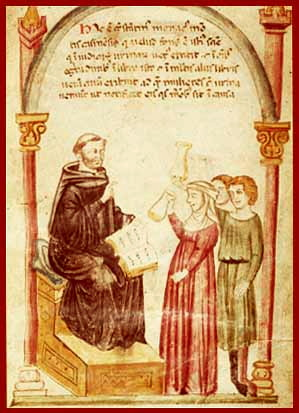
Constantine the African examining the urine of his patients

Books made the Salernitan school famous. They had a strong start with the Pantegni, Constantine's translation and adaptation of the Al-malaki of Haly Abbas, ten volumes of theoretical medicine and ten of practical medicine. He had also translated a treatise on the ophthalmology of Hunayn bin Ishaq and the Viaticus of Ibn al-Jazzar. The most famous pharmacopeia of the Middle Ages, the Antidotarium Nicolai, also was written in the circles of the school. For the transmission of Constantine's translations to Salerno early in the twelfth century an important role seems to belong to Johannes Afflacius. Johannes was the pupil of Constantine at Montecassino. After the middle of the twelfth century the translations of Constantine became the common property of the Salerno school and even the center of its medical teaching.

Among the physicians who trained at the Schola Medica Salernitana is Gilles de Corbeil.

== The third period: 14–19th centuries ==
With the emergence of the University of Naples, the "School" began to lose importance. Over time its prestige was obscured by that of younger universities, especially Montpellier, Padua, and Bologna. The Salernitan institution, however, remained alive for several centuries until, on November 29, 1811, it was abolished by Gioacchino Murat during the reorganization of public education in the Kingdom of Naples. The last seat was the Palazzo Copeta.

The remaining "Doctors of Medicine and Law" at the Salerno Medical School operated in Salerno's "National Convitto Tasso" for fifty years, from 1811 until their closure in 1861, by Francesco De Sanctis, the minister of public instruction for the newborn Kingdom of Italy.

== Medical studies ==
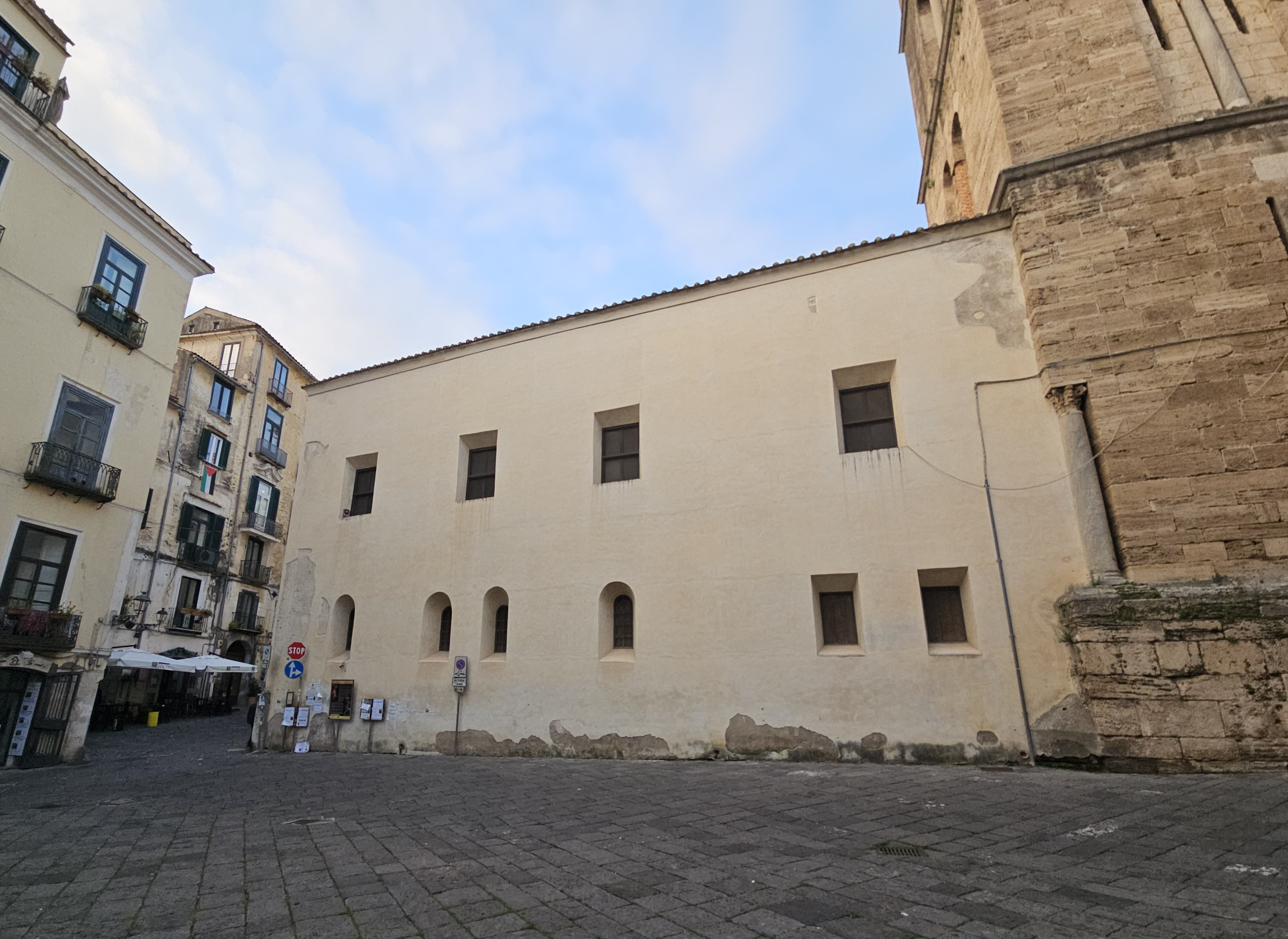
The studies were conducted in the Santa Caterina Auditorium adjacent to Salerno Cathedral

The curriculum studiorum consisted of 3 years of logic, 5 years of medicine (including surgery and anatomy), and a year of practice with an experienced physician. Also, every five years, an autopsy of a human body was planned.

There was a multitude of works on understanding anatomy at Schola Medica Salernitana, which shows that students were practicing anatomical dissection of different animals. An important historical physician during this time who was mentioned by an author of one of the anatomy works previously mentioned, was his master Mathaeus Platearius. Mathaeus Platearius may have been the first teacher to demonstrate dissection of other species to improve understanding of human anatomy. Mathaeus Platearius' would have been well known at this time, because he is also the author of the earliest commentary on Antidotarium Nicolai.

Lessons consisted in the interpretation of the texts of ancient medicine. But while medicine was slow, in Salerno there appeared the new art of surgery which was elevated to the dignity of a true science by Ruggiero di Fugaldo. He wrote the first treatise on national surgery that spread throughout Europe. Therefore, since the 12th century, Salerno was the target of particularly German students. But with Arabic books becoming more common, the scientific influence of the school, which was believed to be of a Latin tradition, was decreasing, superseded by universities in Northern Italy. Alumni such as Bruno da Longobucco also helped disseminate its teaching.

The "School", besides teaching medicine (where women were admitted as both teachers and students), also taught philosophy, theology and law, and that is why some also consider it as the first University ever founded.

The teaching subjects in the Salernitan Medical School are known to us through a special statute. School teachers distinguished medicine in theory and practice. The first gave the necessary lessons to know the body structures, the parts that compose it, and their qualities; the second gave the means to preserve the health and to fight disease. And, in common with all other medical schools of the time, the basis of medical teaching was the principles of Hippocrates and Galen. The ancient texts of Salerno's masters do not deviate from this tradition.

The spread of Salernitan medical doctrines to distant regions is attested by documents such as a codex that is kept in the Capitolare di Modena from the abbey of Nonantola. These confirm the antiquity of medical teaching in Salerno, and prove that the tradition of Latin culture had not switched off and its dissemination center was Salerno.

The most famous treatise produced by the school is Regimen Sanitatis Salernitanum. The work, in Latin verse, appears to be a collection of hygiene rules, based on its doctrine.

== Almo Collegio Salernitano ==
The Medical College was an independent academic body of the School. Its aim was to submit students who had completed the required years of study to a rigorous examination to obtain the doctorate, not only to practice medicine but also to teach it.

The Medical College was a professional organization for the defense of the medics' interests and dignity, and also to put a brake on the pesky work of medicines.

The first sovereign act validating the college's prerogatives by granting legal recognition to the academic titles issued by it dates back to Emperor Frederick II in 1200. All the doctors in the city were "Alunni" and they also gradually had the right to enter the college. Usually the function of conferring graduates took place either in the Church of St. Peter at Court, or of St. Matthew or in the Chapel of St. Catherine. But at the beginning of the year 1000 the conferment took place in the palace of the city.

The oath represented the highest moral conception of the doctor's function, who swore to give his help to the poor without asking for anything and at the same time was a sublime affirmation before God and men to maintain an honest life and strict conduct. In order to obtain a pharmacy license, that is to say in arte aromatariae, the candidate was required to be of a moral and honest character, qualities which the School held in high esteem. Such a diploma was often held as evidence of the 'religious' character of a young graduate. The authenticity of the doctoral privileges, issued by the Collegio di Salerno, was attested by the notary, and was necessary to teach the subject. A doctorate not only had the examination date but also the year of the Pope's accession. This was because the civil calendar varied by state, but not the papal date, especially as regards the diplomas of graduates in foreign countries. The diplomas always bore the seal of the college in wax. In the middle of these circular seals is clearly visible the coat of arms of the city, represented by the patron Saint Matthew in the act of writing the Gospel.

== School professors ==
It is necessary to make a distinction between medicus and medicus et clericus because they mark two distinct periods of Salerno medicine. A medicus was the traditional physician who practiced empiricism, and he uses concoctions to help the patient. Medicus et clericus is a doctor in the original sense of a scholar of art and doctrine. With Garioponto (who studied the ancient Latin writers who followed Hippocrates and Galen) Salernitan medicine begins its golden age. We see for the first time a woman, the famous Trotula de Ruggiero, who ascends to the honors of the chair, and gives instructions to women in labor. At the beginning of 1000 A.D. in Salerno there was a well-ordered school or society which arose by practitioners of medical disciplines. The first constitution of the Societas was formed by those jatrophysici, who took office on the hill Bonae diei and Salernitam Scholam scripsere, laid the foundations of that school and leaving to posterity the Flos Medicinae, a monument of greatness and piety.

The teaching of medicine in Salerno in the Middle Ages was carried out by private professors whose name was assigned to doctors. At that time the number of doctors was low, and many simply followed the traditional family cure from several generations. The Schola was an institute with an independent organization, consisting of teachers with particular merit and was responsible for the Praeses. It was a merit of seniority when the Prior was created as the supreme dignity of the college. But the Praeses had nothing in common with the Prior, since its authority came later within the college.

The medical doctrines spread by Garioponto and his contemporaries did not disappear with them; other masters followed their footsteps. In the second half of the twelfth century three illustrious masters honored their predecessors: Master Salerno, Matteo Plateario junior and Musandino. Salerno's Tabulae Salernitanae and Compendium formulated a general therapy and drug preparation treatment. Matteo Plateario junior wrote Glosse Platearium, where he describes plants and various medicinal products.

Musandino is the renowned master, destined to spread the dogmas of medicine. Other eminent figures were Romualdo Guarna, who was called twice to the bedside of William I of Sicily, and Antonio Solimena, who treated Queen Joanna II of Naples at the end of the 14th century. Distinguished for his doctrine, he was raised to the high office of Maestro Razionale della Magna Curia. Another noble figure was Giovanni da Procida.

There are many Salernitan masters in the centuries who lent their work to war operations. At the service of the army of Robert of Anjou, Duke of Calabria, operating in Sicily in 1299 there are Bartolomeo de Vallona and Filippo Fundacario.

== List of famous professors ==
- Garioponto (10–11th century)
- Peter Cleric (10–11th century)
- Alfano I (11th century)
- Constantine the African (11th century)
- Trota de Ruggiero (11th century, the most famous of the mulieres Saleritanae)
- Pietro da Eboli (11th century)
- Giovanni Afflacio
- Nicolò Salernitano (12th century)
- Saladino d'Ascoli (12th century)
- Giovanni Plateario, husband of Trota and his children:
  - Giovanni Plateario the Young and Matte Plateary (12th century)
- Niccolò da Reggio (Nicola Deoprepio – 13th century)
- Ruggero Frugardi (13th century)
- Giovanni da Procida (13th century)
- Abella (14th century, one of the mulieres Saleritanae)
- Matteo Silvatico (14th century)
- Mercuriade (14th century, probably a pseudonym, was one of the mulieres Saleritanae)
- Constance Calenda (15th century, one of the mulieres Salernitanae)
- Rebecca de Guarna (15th century, one of the mulieres Saleritanae)
- Vincenzo Braca (16–17th century)
- Domenico Cotugno (18th–19th century)
- Giuseppe Gaimari (18–19th century)

== Other legends ==
=== Legend of the Poor Henry ===
This most celebrated legend was handed down by the medieval German minstrels, and written in the 1190s as the narrative poem Der arme Heinrich (Poor Henry) by Hartmann von Aue. The story was then "rediscovered" by Longfellow and published as The Golden Legend (1851). Henry, prince of Germany, was a beautiful and strong young man, engaged with the young princess Elsie. One day, however, he was struck by leprosy and began to swell quickly, so that the subjects, seeing him now destined to certain death, renamed him "Poor Henry". The prince had a dream one night: the devil personally suggested that he be taken care of by the Salernitian doctors, intimating to him that he would only be healed if he had bathed in the blood of a young virgin who had died for him voluntarily. Though Elsie was immediately offered for the horrific sacrifice, Henry refused disdainfully, preferring to listen to the doctors' opinion. After a long voyage, the whole court came to Salerno and Henry, before attending the Medical school, wanted to go to the Cathedral to pray on the tomb of St. Matthew. Here, in a vision, he found himself miraculously cured of evil and married Elsie on the same altar of the saint.

=== Legend of Robert and Sibylla ===
Another tradition is that of the Legend of Robert of Normandy and Sibylla of Conversano. During the crusades, Robert was struck by a poisoned arrow. Because his condition had become serious, he returned to Salerno to consult physicians, whose response was drastic: the only way to save his life was to suck away the poison from the wound, but who would have done it would have died in his place. Roberto dismissed everyone, preferring to die, but his wife Sibylla of Conversano sucked his poison over the night, dying for her beloved husband. This legend is depicted in a miniature on the cover of the Canon of Avicenna, in which one sees Roberto with his court, who greets and thanks the doctors at the gates of the city, while in the background the ships are ready to go; on the left, four other doctors deal with Sibylla, recognizable by the crown, struck down by poison.

== See also ==
- University of Salerno
