= Abella =

14th-century physician of Salerno

- Born: c. 1380
- Other names: Abella of Salerno; Abella of Castellomata
- Education: Salerno School of Medicine
- Known for: Mulieres Salernitanae
- Medical career
- Field: Physician
- Institutions: Salerno School of Medicine
- Sub-specialties: Embryology

Abella, often known as Abella of Salerno or Abella of Castellomata, was a physician in the mid fourteenth century. Abella studied and taught at the Salerno School of Medicine. Abella is believed to have been born around 1380, but the exact time of her birth and death is unclear. Abella lectured on standard medical practices, bile, and women's health and nature at the medical school in Salerno. Abella, along with Rebecca de Guarna, specialized in the area of embryology. She published two treatises: De atrabile (On Black Bile) and De natura seminis humani (on the Nature of the Seminal Fluid), neither of which survive today. In Salvatore De Renzi's nineteenth-century study of the Salerno School of Medicine, Abella is one of four women (along with Rebecca de Guarna, Mercuriade, and Constance Calenda) mentioned who were known to practice medicine, lecture on medicine, and wrote treatises. These attributes placed Abella into a group of women known as the Mulieres Salernitanae, or women of Salerno.

== Legacy ==
Abella is a featured figure on Judy Chicago's installation piece, The Dinner Party. Abella is represented as one of the nine hundred and ninety-nine names included in the Heritage Floor, a supporting piece to The Dinner Party intended to represent numerous women who struggled into prominence, only to have their names erased and/or forgotten. She is linked to the grouping around "Trotula", who is also counted among the "Ladies of Salerno".

== Mulieres Salernitanae ==
The Salerno School of Medicine was the first university to allow women to enter. This resulted in a group of women known as Mulieres Salernitanae, meaning women of Salerno or Salernitan wives. These women were known for their great learning. This group of women consisted of Abella, Trota of Salerno, Mercuriade, Rebecca de Guarna, Maria Incarnata, and Constance Calenda. The women of Salerno not only practiced medicine, but also taught medicine at the Salerno School of Medicine and wrote texts. This group of women worked against the common view and roles of women at the time, and are considered a pride of medieval Salerno and a symbol of beneficence.

== Family of Castellomata ==
The family of Castellomata was an influential family in Salerno, to which Abella is believed to have belonged. The heavy influence of the family helped confirm the vital ties between the papal court and the Salerno School of Medicine. A significant member of this family was Giovanni of Castellomata, who held the title of medicus papae, or “doctor of the pope” to Pope Innocent III. The relationship between Abella and Giovanni of Castellomata is unclear.
