= Women of Salerno =

Group of women physicians in medieval Italy

The women of Salerno, also referred to as the ladies of Salerno and the Salernitan women (Latin: mulieres Salernitanae), were a group of women physicians who studied in medieval Italy, at the Schola Medica Salernitana, one of the first medical schools to allow women.

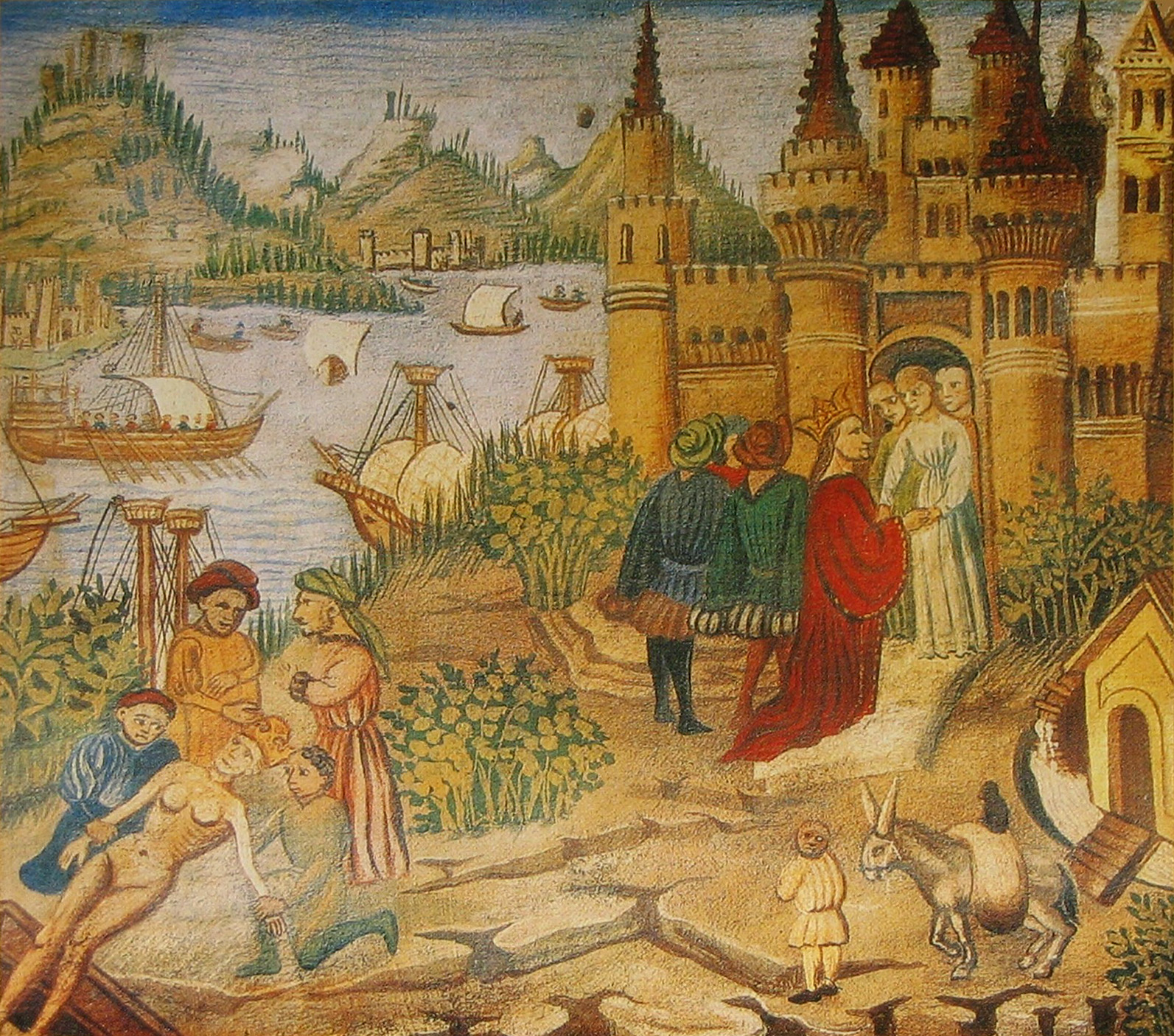
A miniature depicting the Schola Medica Salernitana from a copy of Avicenna's Canons

== Introduction ==
These women practiced medicine, and were known to both teach and to publish medical works. Additionally, there is evidence that the study of female diseases was not their only interest, but they studied, taught, and practiced all branches of medicine, indeed multiple references attest to the vital role they played in surgical and scientific achievements.

It was possible for them to assert themselves within Salerno thanks to a climate of great tolerance that extended itself from women practitioners as well as Jews and Arabs. In addition, during most of its lifetime, Salerno was the only medical school in Europe that opened its doors to women.

== Women in medieval southern Italy and Salerno ==
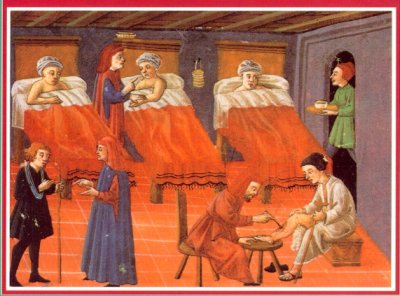
Miniature depicting the Schola Medica Salernitana

In medieval southern Italy, Salerno was, in the 11th century, a "city of extraordinary wealth and splendor for its trade, in which it had supplanted Amalfi and Gaeta. There were cedars, almonds, coated walnuts, imperial drapes, fine gold ornaments; wine, nuts, fruit, trees and crops abounded. Beautiful palaces adorned it; attractive women and upright men lived there" (Guglielmo di Puglia, 1090). In this political, social and cultural background, the women shared the deeds of men, participated in battles and exercised the medical art, as doctor or not. Intellectual openness excluded dogmas and confronted with the daily practice of dialogue and experience, with the comparison of Greek, Latin, and Arab texts that were studied without prejudices or hierarchies of value. In this climate, accepting women as students and even more as teachers seemed natural and important. Indeed, the remedies used by women are appreciated and welcomed in the writings of the Schola Medica Salernitana. Matteo Plateario (1140–1180) mentioned the women of Salerno and their remedies in his Liber De Semplici Medicina.

== Studies and methodologies ==
The women of Salerno were free to talk about sexual topics without moralisms or religious conditioning. In addition, their writings were some of the first to talk about menstruation.

During the early years of the 1000s, people were already talking about fundamental modern values, such as prevention and healthy eating, as a base for medical treatments. The Mulieres Salernitanae preferred treatments like aromatized baths, therapies with herbs and massages, and there are no traces in their history of prayers or other supernatural methods in order to treat diseases.

Generally, Trota's and the other women's writings were the first studies on the female body in medicine.

Fundamental for them was the history of the patient, in order to identify the right therapy. Reading their works shows that they were not only deeply acquainted with the female body, but also had a high knowledge of plants and the benefits of herbs. They were innovative in many respects, considered prevention fundamental, proposed unusual methods for the time, stressed the importance of hygiene, a balanced diet, physical activity, their advice included baths and massages, decoctions, bloodletting. They had no fear of revealing truths never told and to solve problems never solved, their lessons were taught with extreme naturalness of sexuality, contraception using a simple language accessible to all. Their students were able to differentiate between typhoid and malaria, they could calculate fever temperatures and estimate recovery times, and they could treat complex wounds with appreciable chances of success.

== Allegations of witchcraft ==
There were also many rumours about the mulieres salernitanae: as an example, Arnaldo da Villanova, a Spanish scientist, explained that women of Salerno drank mysterious potions during gestation and for this reason women grew aberrant, accompanying the recitation of the Pater noster with a mysterious magic formula:

Binomie lamion lamium azerai vaccina deus deus sabaoth Benedictus qui venit in nomine Domini, hosanna in excelsis.

These rumors were born due to the fact that, despite the wealth and intellectual openness of the city of Salerno, the early medieval era also represented the start of prejudice towards women and the theory of feminine inferiority. Jules Michelet (1862) stated that “the only doctor of the people, for a thousand years, was the Witch”.

Despite these rumors of discredit, however, their fame grew, not only in Italy but also beyond the Alps.

== Notable women of Salerno ==
These women included:

- Trota of Salerno – The most famous of the women of Salerno, Trota is believed to have lived during the 11th or 12th century. She had long been believed to be "Trotula of Salerno", the author of a 3-part book about medical treatments for women, De curis mulierum ("On Treatments for Women"). However, recent discoveries indicate she was likely only the author of one third of this compendium.
- Constance Calenda (15th century) – Lectured on medicine and was eventually a professor at the University of Naples.
- Rebecca Guarna – Published works on "Fevers, De febrius" the "Urine, De Urinis" and the "Embryo, De embrione".
- Abella – Published works on "Black Bile" and "Nature of Seminal Fluid"
- Maria Incarnata
- Mercuriade – Published works on "Crises", "Pestilent Fever, De Febre Pestilenti", and "The Cure of Wounds, De Curatio"

The first to remember the women of Salerno was a historian from Salerno, Antonio Mazza, prior of the School of Medicine in the seventeenth century, who in the essay "Historiarum epitome de rebus salernitanis" writes: "We have many learned women, who in many fields surpassed or equalled by ingenuity and doctrine many men and, like men, were remarkable in the field of medicine." Among the most famous women who attended the school of Salerno was Francesca Cenci, wife of Matteo Romano Cenci, who received a degree in medicine and surgery from Charles of Anjou, Duke of Calabria, in 1321. Abella, from the noble family of Castellaneta, wrote “De atrabile” and “De nature seminis humani”, of which, unfortunately, any trace has been lost. Rebecca de Guarna specialized in the study and treatment of urinary diseases and fevers. Mercuriade, surgeon, wrote many didactic essays: “Le crisi”, “La febbre da pestilenza”, and “La cura delle ferite”. The most known of the women of Salerno is Trota, who was a Magistra of Medicine at the School of Salerno and ran a prolific clinical practice. She taught her students about three types of diseases: inherited, contagious, and self-generated, and this type of teaching was carried on by all the other women.

== Contributions ==
One of the most important contributions of the women of Salerno is a textbook that was widely distributed throughout Europe. The textbook, “De Passionibus Mulierum ante in et post partum”, that witnesses the birth of obstetrics and gynecology as science, was first published around 1100 AD and completely revised by Ambrose Paré's assistants in the early 17th century. Also Paley, one of the greatest anatomist of his time, stated that many of his important anatomical and surgical considerations came directly or indirectly from the work of Salerno women. He advances that Salerno women first documents, thoughts and practices are an interesting and important part of our surgical heritage.

The work begins by outlining the characteristic nature of the female sex, which, unlike the nature of the male, hot and dry, is rather cold and humid. So, women lacking the heat necessary to dissipate bad moods, their diseases were more frequent and mainly affect the reproductive organs. To defend themselves from moods women have a particular purification, menstruation, whose regularity is a source and sign of health. The first task of the doctor is then to diagnose the reasons for the interruption of the regularity or scarcity of the menstruation and to identify with the pharmacopoeia the appropriate remedies.

Perineal tears and uterine tears were identified as common wounds often encountered by midwives, giving Trotula and her students ample opportunity to develop new techniques and remedies for wound healing.

The anatomy of the reproductive organs was known only through animal anatomy and written descriptions in Islamic texts. Salernian female physicians made an important contribution on this subject because female physicians had greater access to female patients than their male colleagues. They deepened the study of the female body, coming to theorize that infertility could also depend on men and not only women.

== Bibliography ==
  - Alaina Ferraris BA, Zoe, Ferraris, Victor A. The women of Salerno, Contribution to the Origins of Surgery From Medieval Italy, PubMed (1997)
  - Bestini, F., Cardini, F., Leopardi, C., Fumagalli, Beoni Brocchieri, M.T., Medioevo al Femminile, Laterza (1989) pp. 1–13
  - Boggi Cavallo, P., Salerno e la sua Scuola Medica, Arti Grafiche Boccia (1994) pp. 100/104
  - Bonnie S Anderson, Zinnser Bs., A history of Their Own Women in Europe from Prehistory to Present, Oxford University Press (1999), volume 2
  - Brooke, E., Women healers portraits of herbalists, physicians and midwives, Healing Arts Press, Rochester (1995) pp. 28/39
  - Campbell Hurd Mead K., Trotula, The University of Chicago Press (1930), pp 349/366
  - Fielding Hudson G., An Introduction to the History of Medicine, Saunders Company (1917) pp. 180–193
  - Jacquart, D., A History of Twelfth Century Western philosophy, Cambridge University Press (2011), chapter 15
  - Plateario M., Liber De Semplici Medicina
  - Quagliolo F., Mulieres Salernitanae, Scienza e Cultura nel Principato di Salerno, storienapoli.it
  - Quagliolo F., Mulieres Salernitanae, a Salerno le prime donne che studiarono medicina nel Medioevo, storienapoli.it
  - Rashdall H., The Universities of Europe in the Middle Ages. Cambridge University Press (1895) pp. 75–86
  - Siraisi NG., Medieval and Early Renaissance Medicine, an Introduction to Knowledge and Practice, University of Chicago Press, pp 13/15,84/90,162,169
