= Antidotarium Nicolai =

The Antidotarium Nicolai, also known as the Antidotarium parvum or small antidotarium, was a late 11th or early 12th-century Latin book with about 150 recipes for the creation of medicines from plants and minerals. It was written in the circles of the Schola Medica Salernitana, the center of European medical knowledge in the High Middle Ages. It was based in part on the Antidotarium of Constantine the African, an 11th-century work also written in Salerno which was itself partially a translation of older Arabic works. It has been called "without doubt one of the most influential medical texts in medieval literature", "the essential pharmacopeia of the Middle Ages" and "the bible of medieval practical pharmacy". It was often coupled with the Circa instans, another 12th-century compendium of less complex medicines.

== Contents ==
The oldest versions of the book contain some 115 recipes, while later versions can go to 175 recipes; most versions have about 150 descriptions of medicines. These recipes are not new inventions but a selection of existing recipes from the 11th-century Antidotarium magnum and other works. They are listed alphabetically. The book has little information on how medicines should technically be prepared, but focuses on ingredients, including their sequence and the quantities needed, and the manner in which they should be administered. The quantities were much reduced and standardized compared to older works. It introduces new names for many of the medicines, with etymological explanations: they are either named after the main ingredient, after the main effect they have, or after the supposed inventor of them. Much of this information was taken from the Etymologiae by Isidore of Seville.

== Author and origin ==
The author of the Antidotarium Nicolai is unknown and has been the subject of a lot of speculation; even whether the writer was called Nicolaus or used a pseudonym is not certain. Suggestions include a doctor from Salerno, a professor at the Schola Medica, or a Salernian physician called Nicolò Aversano. Estimates of the date also vary from the eleventh century until the mid-thirteenth century. Some experts even claim that there were multiple works with the same name, including a French one from the 15th century written by Nicolas de Farnham.

The Antidotarium Nicolai is first mentioned in 1244, in the Speculum Naturale of Vincent of Beauvais; all known manuscript copies of the Antidotarium date to the middle of the 13th century or later. A twelfth-century commentary on the book, the Expositio super Antidotarium Nicolai may have been written by Mattheus Platearius, who died in 1161. This commentary was printed in Venice in 1549. Gilles de Corbeil (ca. 1140 – ca. 1224), a French royal physician, wrote De laudibus et virtutibus compositorum medicaminum, partly based on the Antidotarium. Jean de St. Amand, medecin at the University of Paris in the 13th century, also wrote a "Expositio supra Antidotarium Nicolai". These works are only known through later manuscripts and printings though.

== Influence ==
The Antidotarium is credited with having introduced the Salernian version of the apothecaries' system of weights, with 20 granum making 1 scrupulum.

The book was used as a textbook at the University of Paris by 1270 and in Montpellier by 1309. It was used as the official pharmaceutical guide in Naples and Sicily at the end of the 12th century, and in Ypres in the late 13th century. It was translated into Italian, French (once in the 14th, once in the 15th century), Hebrew (at least 17 different translations), Spanish, Arabic and Middle Dutch (at least five manuscripts known, one dated 1351). It was printed in 1471 in Venice and reprinted at least 8 times before 1500. It was in use until the 18th century.

== Bibliography ==
- Garcia-Ballester, Luis (1994), Practical Medicine from Salerno to the Black Death, Cambridge University Press, ISBN 978-052143101-9
- Glick, Thomas F., ed. (2014), Medieval Science, Technology, and Medicine: An Encyclopedia, Routledge, ISBN 978-113545939-0
- Goltz, Dietlinde (1976), Mittelalterliche Pharmazie und Medizin. Dargestellt an Geschichte und Inhalt des Antidotarium Nicolai. Mit einer Druckfassung von 1491 (in German), Wiss. Verl.-Ges, ISBN 978-380470539-5
- Hunt, Tony (1990), Popular Medicine in Thirteenth-century England, Boydell & Brewer, ISBN 978-085991290-7
- Prioreschi, Plinio (2003), Medieval Medicine, Horatius Press, ISBN 978-188845605-9
- Van den Berg, W. S., ed. (1917), Antidotarium Nicolaï (in Dutch), Leiden: Brill
- Wallis, Faith (2010), Medieval Medicine: A Reader, University of Toronto Press, ISBN 978-144260103-1
