= Guarna =

Guarna is an Italian surname. Notable people with the surname include:

- Enrico Guarna (born 1985), Italian footballer
- Rebecca Guarna, 13th-century Italian physician, surgeon and writer
- Romuald Guarna, 12th-century Roman Catholic archbishop
