= Monica Green (historian) =

Medieval historian

Monica H. Green is an American historian of science who specializes in premodern and medieval plagues and medicine. She also has extensive research into medieval women and how gender affected Western healthcare. She was inspired to research women and gender's role in premodern healthcare after reading Christine de Pizan's "Book of the City of Ladies".

== Education ==
Green received a Bachelor of Arts degree from Barnard College in 1978. She then attended Princeton University, where she obtained a master's degree in 1981 and her Ph.D. in the history of science in 1985. Her doctoral thesis was titled, "The Transmission of Ancient Theories of Female Physiology and Disease Through the Early Middle Ages." It examines the evolution of gynecological texts throughout ancient Latin and Arabic cultures.

== Career ==
Green was a lecturer at Princeton University from 1983 to 1985. After that, she became a postdoctoral fellow and visiting lecturer at University of North Carolina, Chapel Hill from 1985 to 1987. She was then appointed to assistant professor of history at Duke University in 1987, and was promoted to associate professor of history in 1995. She was a fellow at the Radcliffe Institute for Advanced Study, from 2001–2002. Green held an American Council of Learned Societies Fellowship in 2009. Her project was titled The Midwife, the Surgeon, and the Lawyer: The Intersections of Obstetrics and Law to 1800. Returning to Princeton University in 1990 to 1992 as well as from 2013-2014, she became a fellow at the Institute for Advanced Study. In 2001 she was appointed professor of history at Arizona State University. In 2013, she was a visiting fellow in medieval studies at Fordham University. Since December, 2019 she has been continuing her work as an independent scholar.

Green edited the first volume of the Journal, The Medieval Globe in 2015, and she is on the editorial board. She often is called upon by media outlets such as The Washington Post to discuss pandemics and the spread of disease.

== Honors ==
In 2004, Green was co-winner of the John Nicholas Brown Prize, awarded by the Medieval Academy of America for her book, Women's Healthcare in the Medieval West: Texts and Contexts (Ashgate, 2000). In 2009 Green was awarded the Margaret W. Rossiter History of Women in Science Prize, awarded by the History of Science Society, for her book, Making Women's Medicine Masculine: The Rise of Male Authority in Pre-Modern Gynaecology (Oxford University Press, 2008).

In 2011 Green was elected as fellow to the Medieval Academy of America. In 2014, Green was awarded the Joseph H. Hazen Education Prize in recognition of outstanding contributions to the teaching of history of science by the History of Science Society. In 2015 she won a Berlin Prize Fellowship. In 2018, Green was awarded the prestigious CARA Award for Excellence in Teaching Medieval Studies by the Medieval Academy of America. She gave the Society for Medieval Archaeology 2019 Annual Conference Keynote with the lecture The Historian, the Archaeologist, and the Geneticist: Pandemic Thinking.

In 2021, during the COVID-19 pandemic, the Medieval Academy of America announced the new Monica H. Green Prize for Distinguished Medieval Research, which is an annual award for medieval research showing the value of medieval studies in modern life, honouring Prof. Green's long-term works in medieval disease and pandemic.

== Research ==
Green has various studies and extensive research into Medieval diseases and infections. In December 2020, "The Four Black Deaths" by Green was published in the American Historical Review. In the article she documents historical records suggesting that the second documented pandemic of bubonic plague may have begun in the 1200s rather than the 1300s. Green has published 86 plague studies as well as 12 studies concerning leprosy.

Green also has extensively researched how women were treated in the Western medical field, and how gender impacted its development. Women's reproductive healthcare was just as important in the Middle Ages as it is today, and we know that medieval practitioners and commoners recognized its significance. The first recorded obstetric manuscripts from the 12th century is titled Trotula. There is a debate on who the author of these medieval medical texts was; the most popular theory credits a medieval woman practitioner, Trota of Salerno. Green annually publishes a digital paper that details new information and updates about the history of Trotula. She also uses this as an opportunity to build on previous research that explained the significance of a 12th century woman to the modern medical field.

== Family ==
Green's father is Marlon Green, a pilot whose landmark United States Supreme Court decision in 1963 helped dismantle racial discrimination in the American passenger airline industry. This influenced Green from a young age to research into the history of Western healthcare to discover any women of color in the field. She gives them the credit they deserve for any contributions they have made.

== Selected works ==
- 'When Numbers Don't Count: Changing Perspectives on the Justianic Plague', Eidolon, 18 November 2019, https://eidolon.pub/when-numbers-dont-count-56a2b3c3d07
- (ed.) Pandemic Disease in the Medieval World: Rethinking the Black Death (Kalamazoo : Arc Medieval Press, 2015)
- Making Women’s Medicine Masculine: The Rise of Male Authority in Pre-Modern Gynaecology. Oxford: Oxford University Press, 2008. ISBN 978-0-19-921149-4 (awarded the 2009 Margaret W. Rossiter History of Women in Science Prize by the History of Science Society)
- 'Conversing with the Minority: Relations Among Christian, Jewish, and Muslim Women in the High Middle Ages', Journal of Medieval History, 34, no 2 (2008)
- The ‘Trotula’: A Medieval Compendium of Women’s Medicine. Philadelphia: University of Pennsylvania Press, 2001. ISBN 978-0-8122-3589-0
- Women’s Healthcare in the Medieval West: Texts and Contexts, Variorum Collected Studies Series, CS680. Aldershot: Ashgate, 2000. ISBN 0-86078-826-1
