= Alfanus I =

Saint Alfanus
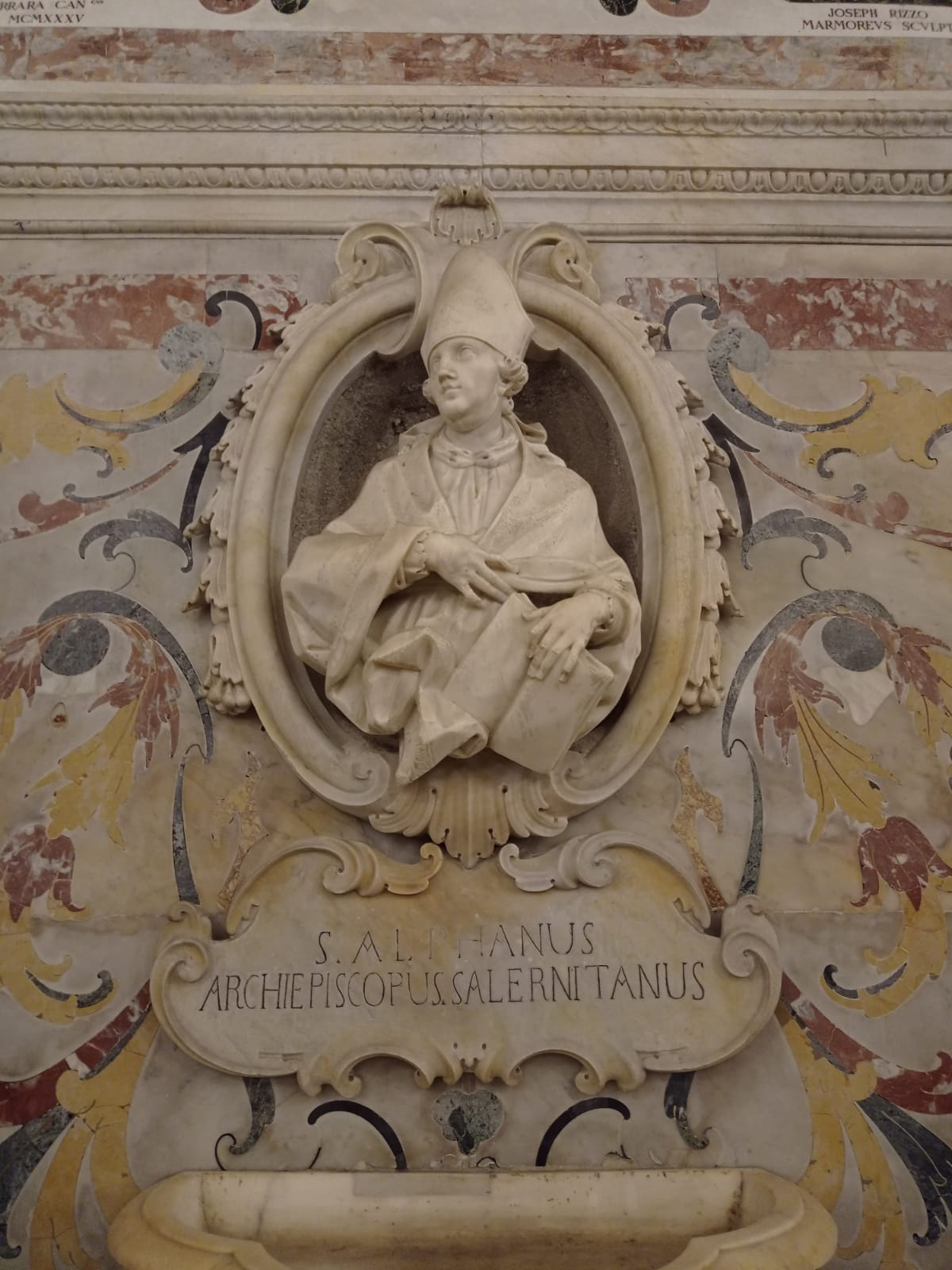
- Alfanus I, archbishop of Salerno

archbishop
- Born: Salerno
- Died: October 9, 1085; Salerno
- Venerated in: Roman Catholic Church
- Canonized: pre-congregation
- Feast: October 9

Saint Alfanus I or Alfano I (died 1085) was the archbishop of Salerno from 1058 until his death. He was famed as a translator, writer, theologian, and medical doctor. He has been described as "the greatest cultural protagonist of literature and science in Salerno". His feast day is commemorated on October 9th.

== Life ==
Alfanus was born to a noble Langobard family of Salerno between 1015 and 1020. He had an excellent education in the liberal arts and developed a wide knowledge of literature. Alfanus was a physician, one of the earliest great doctors of the Schola Medica Salernitana. The young monk Desiderius (later Pope Victor III) fell ill and traveled from Montecassino seeking treatment. He and Alfanus became life-long friends.

Alfanus joined the Abbey of Montecassino in 1056, but did not remain there long before being sent to take charge of the Benedictine monastery in Salerno. In 1058, Pope Stephen IX, the abbot of Montecassino, named Alfanus archbishop of Salerno. He made a pilgrimage to Jerusalem with Gisulf II of Salerno, stopping by Constantinople in 1062, where Gisulf sought Byzantine assistance in holding off Robert Guiscard's expansion into his territory. That same year Alfanus gave the prince three strongholds in exchange for the monastery of San Vito. Efforts to withstand Guiscard ultimately proved unsuccessful.

As a translator, Alfanus was well-versed in both Latin and Arabic, translating many manuscripts from the latter into the former. His interest in medicine and the translation of Arabic treatises on the subject led him to invite Constantine the African from Carthage (in what is now Tunisia) to Salerno to assist him. Constantine brought with him a library of Arabic medical texts which he commenced to translate into Latin. Alfanus also translated Greek medical treatises into Latin.

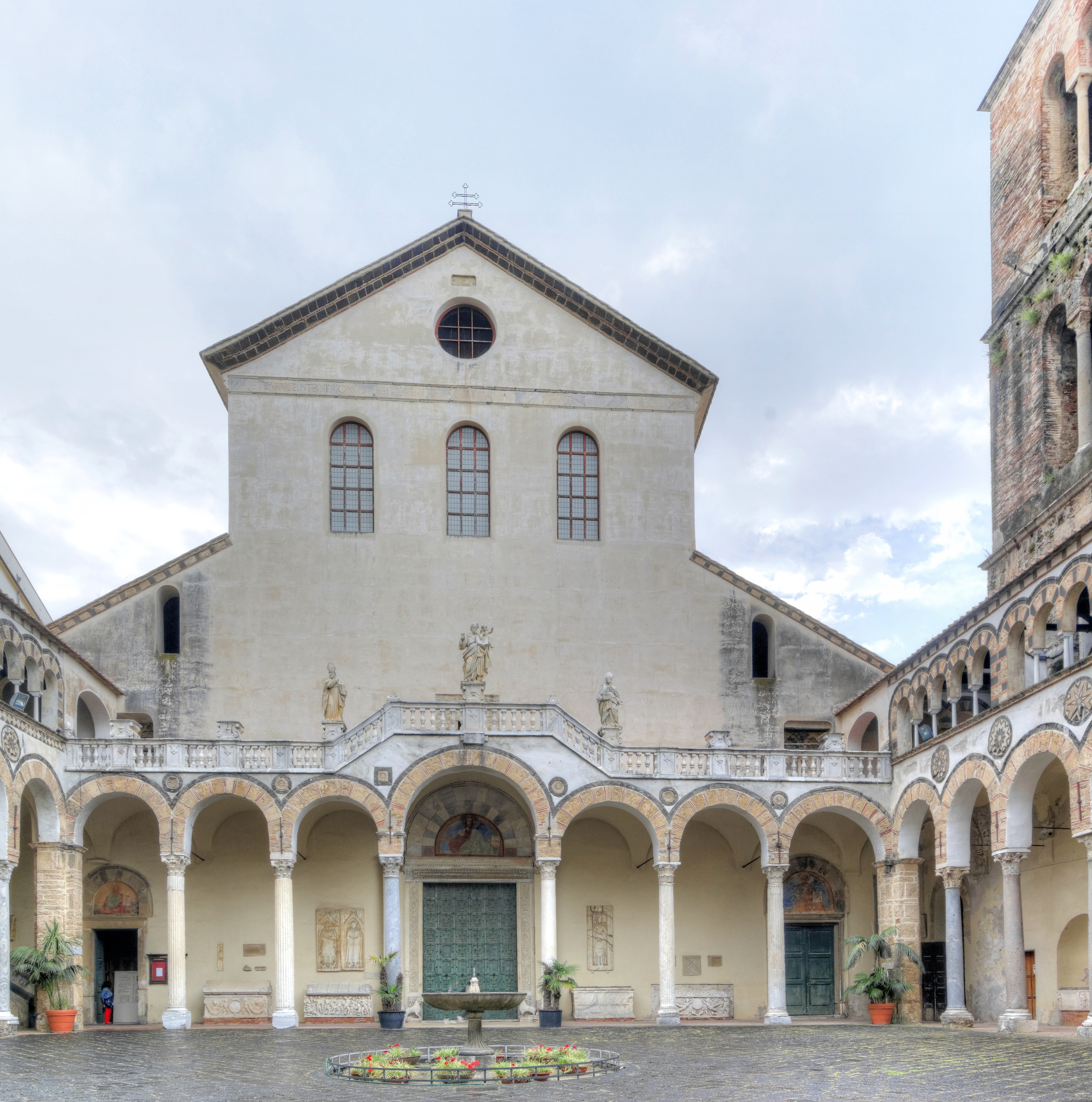
San Matteo, Facade and Cloister

He also wrote a number of poems and hymns.

As archbishop, Alfanus re-organized the archdiocese. He was a friend of Hildebrand of Sovana (later Pope Gregory VII) and Abbot Desiderius of Monte Cassino. He was also a patron of the arts and sciences, and politically influential.

In wielding control of southern Italy, Robert Guiscard sought to cultivate popular support. He married a Lombard princess from Salerno, retained Lombard coinage and local officials, and promoted the cult of the local patron, St. Matthew. In this he relied on the influential support of the Archbishop who praised and promoted the strong ties between the people of Salerno and St. Matthew's cult. In 1076, Guiscard laid the foundations for the new Salerno Cathedral. It was dedicated to Saint Matthew, whose relics were translated to the new crypt in 1080.

In Alfanus' later days as archbishop, he sheltered the exiled reformer, Pope Gregory VII, who died in Salerno.

== Sources ==
- "Alfano di Salerno 1015/20-1085" (in Italian).
- Anselmo Lentini: Sul viaggio costantinopolitano di Gisulfo di Salerno con l'arcivescovo Alfano. In: Atti del III Congresso di studi sull'Alto Medioevo (Benevento-Montevergine-Salerno-Amalfi, 14-18 ottobre 1956), Spoleto 1959, S. 437-443.
- Leah Shopkov: Artikel 'Alphanus of Salerno'. In: In: Dictionary of the Middle Ages, 1982, Tl. 1, S. 218-219.
