= Salvatore De Renzi =

Italian physician and writer

Salvatore De Renzi (19 January 1800, in Paternopoli – 26 February 1872, in Naples) was an Italian medical doctor and writer.

== Biography ==
=== Early years ===
Salvatore De Renzi was born in Paternopoli, province of Avellino, on 19 January 1800 and was raised by his parents, Donato and Maria Rosaria del Grosso. His family was going through grave economic hardship, to the point that the responsibility for his education was taken by De Renzi's archpriest uncle, Giuseppe De Renzi, who died before young Salvatore could complete his university studies. He nonetheless managed to graduate in medicine at the Università degli Studi di Napoli (which would become Università degli Studi di Napoli Federico II in 1987) where he was taught by eminent professors such as Benedetto Vulpes (Director of the Medical Clinic in the University of Naples, 1782–1855); in the course of his studies, he displayed a certain promptness and passionate interest towards this discipline and nowadays he is still highly regarded for his work.

In January 1821, while still an undergraduate, De Renzi won a contest for the office of "Ufficiale Sanitario di Terra", an official responsible for the communal health board of Naples, charged with hygiene and prophylaxis vigilance, serving as a medical assistant for Guglielmo Pepe, a protagonist of the 1820–1821 Neapolitan revolution.

Due to his sympathies towards liberal ideals, he was deposed shortly after the Borbonic revolution, and forced to hide. After graduating at an extraordinarily young age, presumably in 1822, he entered a contest for a place in the medical clinic of the University of Naples; despite winning said contest, he was once again dismissed for political reasons, losing yet another important job.

Whilst dealing with disappointment and bitterness of these failures, he began his professional career at the Hospital of San Giuseppe and Santa Lucia, where he was appointed as "Instructor of the blind" in 1824. This position allowed him to publish two important writings on psychological aspects of blind patients: "Sull'indole morale dei ciechi" (On the moral nature of the blind, Naples 1827), and "Lettera al dott. Guillié sull'indole morale dei ciechi" (Letter to doctor Guillié on the moral nature of the blind, ibid. 1828).

=== Study and research ===
He worked and researched intensely despite struggling with poverty. During this time, he also published a significant amount of scientific, political and historic works, including a short novel entitled "I màrtiri americani" (The American martyrs) about Christian missionaries massacred by Native American tribes.

His political beliefs, however, which can also be found in his literary works, heavily hindered his career, which saw limited progress in the 1820s.

In his late twenties he focuses more on health policies (epidemics, medical statistics, smallpox vaccine): in 1826 he starts working at the Royal Vaccine Institute of Naples, of which he will become permanent secretary in 1840. In his first important work, “Miasmi paludosi e luoghi del Regno di Napoli dove si sviluppano” (Marshy stenches and places of the Reign of Naples where they thrive), Naples 1826, De Renzi thoroughly examines malaria, cholera, and other infectious diseases in the Kingdom of Naples, and explains clearly and in great detail the concept of miasma, also mentioning the role of virus in epidemics.

His endeavour in promoting immunization campaigns was largely appreciated by numerous scientific societies: among these, De Renzi was openly praised by the Jenner's Society of London and the Académie des Sciences of Paris. His activity was not limited to the Kingdom of Naples: he also deserves credit for introducing the practice of vaccination to the Papal States, which would receive official recognition in 1842, when he was awarded a gold medal by Pope Gregory XVI himself.

=== Proficuous literary activity ===
Along with his studies on pathology and infectious diseases (which earned him fame as one of the greatest pathologists of the 1830s), during this decade he fully dedicated himself to literature. In 1831, he established his personal medical journal called Filiatre-Sebezio, which he continued to publish at his own expense until 1869, when it was absorbed by Liguria Medica, an important Italian medical journal.

==== Contribution to the history of medicine ====
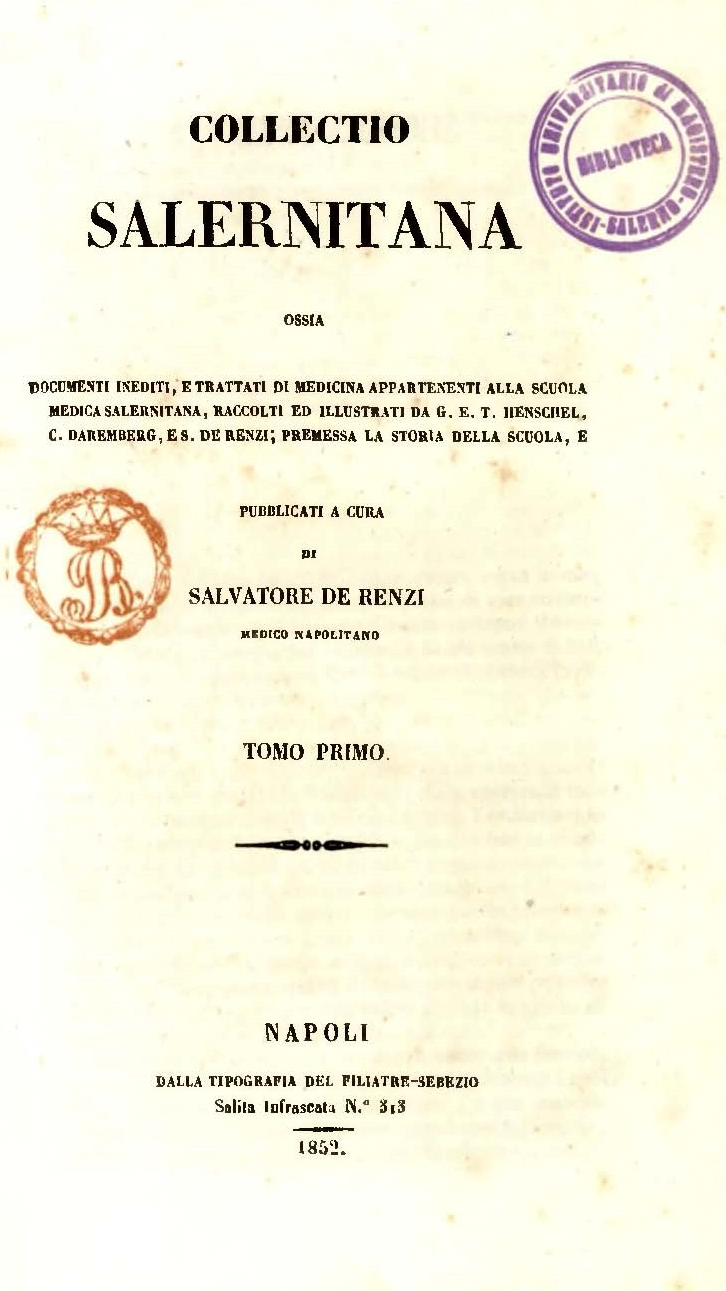
Frontispiece of the first original tome of the Collectio Salernitana, Naples 1852

Salvatore De Renzi's name is inextricably bound to his works as a scholar, to which he dedicated a tenacious and persistent endeavour throughout all his life. He, along with Francesco Puccinotti (1792–1872), can be considered one of the founding fathers of Italian medical historiography. Around 1832, De Renzi developed an interest in the evolution of the figure of the physician in Italy. His masterpiece, Storia della medicina in Italia (History of medicine in Italy, Naples 1845–1848), includes the evolution of medicine in Italy ranging from the Etruscan age to the end of the 18th century in five considerable volumes. De Renzi does not deny the inspiration taken from Giambattista Vico while writing the Storia; neither does he hide his admiration for Vincenzo Gioberti's ideals. These influences undeniably give his Storia della medicina in Italia a distinctly political approach: de Renzi had a consistent motivational role during the Springtime of the Peoples in 1848: one of the purposes of his magnum opus was to highlight the professional distinction of Italian physicians, in order to fuel proud revolutionary uprisings which would then lead to the unification of Italy.

===== Collectio Salernitana =====
Collectio salernitana was first published in 1852 and is the first book to document the medical school of Salerno and the role it had at the forefront of the scientific-medical field from 1000 to 1200. The school was most likely founded in 694 by Benedictines and was mostly linked to Greco-Roman medical traditions until Gerard of Cremona introduced doctrines from Arab medical practices and schools. His passionate documentation of the importance of an Italian school brought to light the importance of individuating not only medical but cultural national roots.

=== Decline and final years ===
De Renzi's great work as a scholar was finally acknowledged when, with the unification of Italy, a new contest for the professorship in History of Medicine of the University of Naples was organized. De Renzi was finally able to cover the role he had wanted and deserved until 1869, when he was forced to relinquish his title due to illness. The temper which had characterized him throughout his vast researches and his tireless editorial activity was severely undermined: the last years of his life were afflicted by recurring cardiovascular incidents.

His last big role was the presidency of the International Medical Congress which took place in Florence in 1869. He died in Naples three years later on 25 February 1872, at the age of 72.

== Works ==
- Miasmi paludosi e luoghi del regno di Napoli dove si sviluppano, Vara, Naples 1826
- Osservazioni sulla indole morale dei ciechi, seguite da alcune poesie del cieco nato Paolo Sgobba e da un sunto storico del reale ospizio dei ciechi dei S.S. Giuseppe e Lucia, Naples 1829
- Osservazioni sulla topografia-medica del regno di Napoli (tre volumi), Società Tipografica, Naples 1829-1830
- Osservazioni sul tarantismo di Puglia: prolusione accademica / recitata nell'ordinaria seduta del di 28 luglio 1832 dell'Accademia medico-chirurgica napolitana dal dottor Salvatore De Renzi, typography of Filiatre-Sebezio, Naples 1832
- Topografia e statistica medica della città di Napoli (dedicata all'Intendente Antonio Sancio), typography Filiatre Sebezio, Naples 1832 (printed four times between 1832 and 1845)
- Viaggio medico a Parigi con alcuni particolari sopra Pisa, Genova, Livorno, Marsiglia, e Lione, tipografia del Filiatre Sebezio, Naples 1834
- Storia della Medicina Italiana (cinque volumi), typography of Filiatre-Sebezio, Naples 1845-1848
- Collectio Salernitana ossia Documenti inediti e trattati di medicina appartenenti alla scuola medica salernitana raccolti e illustrati da G. E. T. Henschel, C. Daremberg e S. De Renzi; premessa la storia della scuola e pubblicati a cura di S. De Renzi medico napolitano, Sebezio, Naples 1852
- Il secolo decimoterzo e Giovanni da Procida: studii storico morali (dodici libri), Del Vaglio, Naples 1860
- Sulle acque termo-minerali balneolane dette dei Bagnoli scoperte nel 1831 da' signori Fiorillo e De Pierno, G. Masullo, Naples 1863
- Condizioni del popolo italiano nel Medio-Evo per ciò che riguarda il Papato, G. Nobile typography, Naples 1864-1865
- Tre secoli di rivoluzioni napoletane, G. Nobile, Naples 1866
- Napoli nell'anno 1656, D. De Pascale, Naples 1867
- Napoli nell'anno 1764, ossia Documenti della carestia e della epidemia che desolarono Napoli nel 1764: preceduti dalla storia di quelle sventure, Nobile, Naples 1868
- Giovanni da Procida ed il Vespro Siciliano: storia del secolo decimo-terzo, Gabriele Regina, Naples 1876

== Bibliography ==
- ABBRI, FERDINANDO (1988). "VINCENZO CAPPELLETTI, FEDERICO DI TROCCHIO (a cura di), De Sedibus, et Causis. Morgagni nel Centenario. Roma, Istituto della Enciclopedia Italiana 1986, 393 pp. (« Acta Encyclopaedica 6 »)". Nuncius. 3 (1): 300–301. doi:10.1163/182539188x00375. ISSN 0394-7394
- BELLONI, LUIGI (1976). "I carteggi di S. De Renzi e di Ch.-V. Daremberg con F. Puccinotti (per la storiografia della Scuola Medica Salernitana)", Milano, pp. 405–408
- CAPPELLETTI, VINCENZO, DI TROCCHIO, FEDERICO (1991). "Salvatore De Renzi", Dizionario Biografico degli Italiani, Vol. 39 (1991)
- PORTER, ROY (1985). "Dizionario biografico della Storia della Medicina e delle Scienze Naturali (Liber Amicorum)", Vol. 1(A-E), pp. 246–247
