= Magister Salernus =

Italian alchemist (died 1167)

Magister Salernus (died 1167) was a medieval alchemist from the School of Salerno who provided one of the first recipes for the fractional distillation of alcohol. He was one of the supposed founders of the Salerno School, along with the Jewish Helinus, the Greek Pontus, and the Arab Adela.

== See also ==
- Timeline of chemistry
