= Mercuriade =

Italian physician

Mercuriade (14th century) was an Italian physician, surgeon and medical author. She is one of the few woman physicians known from the Middle Ages.

Mercuriade trained in medicine at the University of Salerno, as one of a very small number of female students. She was the author of the treaties De Febre Pestilenti (on Crisis in Pestilent Fever), De Curatio (The Cure of Wounds) and De Ungentis (on Ungentis). Her work was included in the Collectio Salernitana.

She is considered one of the "ladies of Salerno" along with Abella, Rebecca Guarna, and Francesca de Romana who attended the medical school in Salerno from its beginning and helped usher in a "medical renaissance" in Europe.
