= Clarice di Durisio =

Italian physician and surgeon

Clarice di Durisio da Foggia (fl. 15th century), was an Italian eye physician and surgeon from Foggia.

She was educated at the University of Salerno and belonged to the minority of female students of her time period. She specialized in the diseases of the eye and was licensed to treat only female patients.

== See also ==
- Green, Monica H. (2000). Women's healthcare in the medieval West: texts and contexts. Aldershot: Ashgate. ISBN 9780860788263.
