= Trota of Salerno =

12th-century medical practitioner and writer

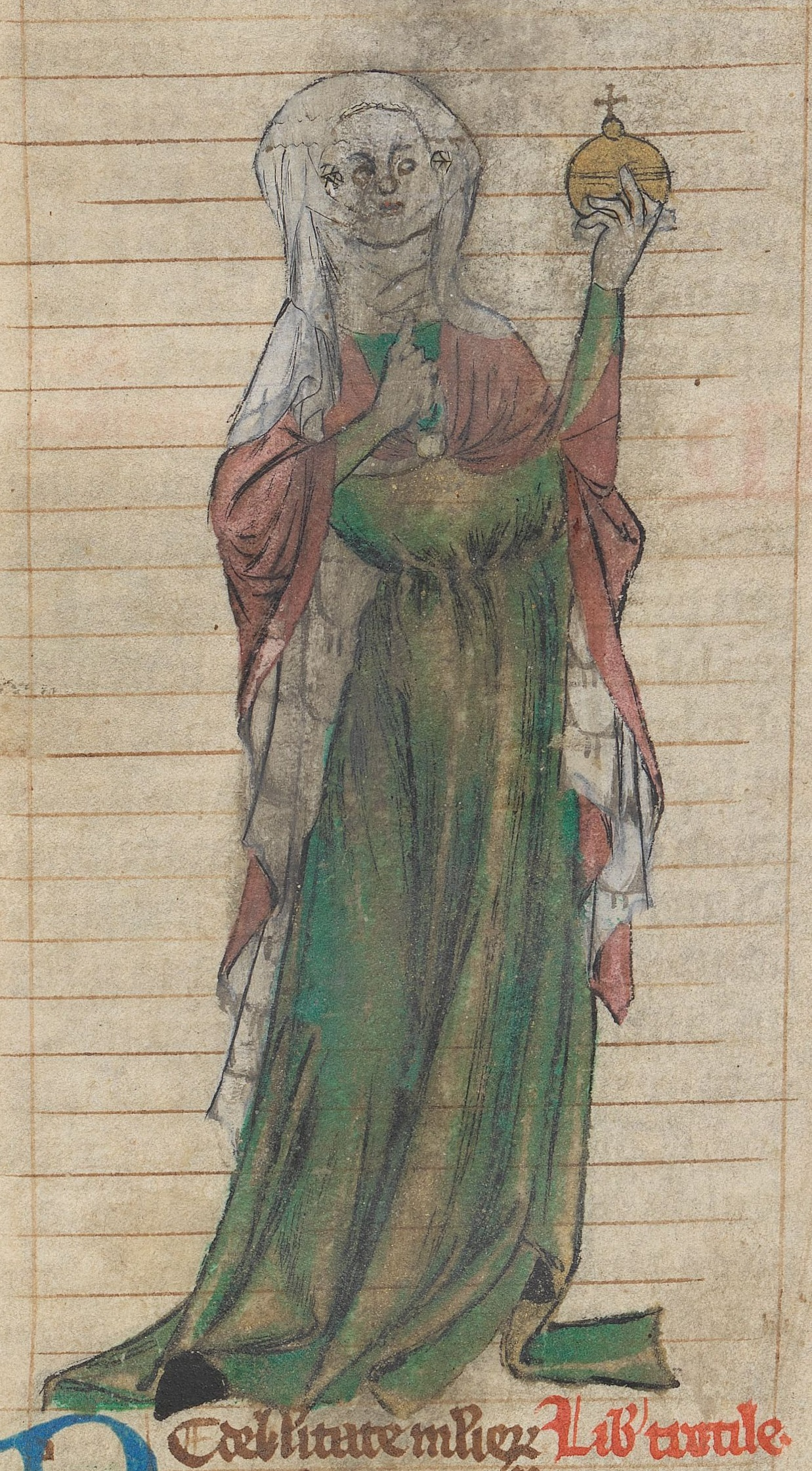
Trota of Salerno

Trota of Salerno (also spelled Trocta), often called Trotula, was a medical practitioner and writer in the southern Italian coastal town of Salerno who lived in the early or middle decades of the 12th century. She was one of a group of women physicians who studied in medieval Italy at the Schola Medica Salernitana, the first medical schools to allow women in Europe.

== Trotula's fame ==
Her fame spread as far as France and England in the 12th and 13th centuries. A Latin text that gathered some of her therapies (and recounted a cure she had performed) was incorporated into an ensemble of treatises on women's medicine that came to be known as the Trotula, "the little book [called] 'Trotula'". Gradually, readers became unaware that this was the work of three different authors. They were also unaware of the name of the historical writer, which was "Trota" and not "Trotula". The latter was thenceforth misunderstood as the author of the whole compendium. These misconceptions about the author of Trotula contributed to the erasure or modification of her name, gender, level of education, medical knowledge, or the time period in which the texts were written; this trend often resulted from the biases of later scholars. Trota's authentic work (including a collection of her cures, known as the Practical Medicine According to Trota) was forgotten until it was rediscovered in the late 20th century.

== Separating Trota from "Trotula" ==
"Trotta" or "Trocta" are the only forms of this common woman's name found in Salernitan sources of the 12th century; "Trotula", in contrast, is never documented as a woman's name. In the later 12th century, part of the work associated with the historic medical practitioner, Trota of Salerno, the De curis mulierum ("On Treatments for Women"), was subsumed into a compendium of three different works on women's medicine by three different authors. Since Trota's work was the only one of the three that bore an author's name, she was credited with the whole ensemble, which was initially dubbed with the title the Trotula, the "little (work of) Trota". As the ensemble began to circulate outside of southern Italy, the title "Trotula" was soon misunderstood as an author's name, and “Trotula” came to be seen as the singular author of all three texts in the Trotula ensemble.

Whatever of Trota's fame endured beyond the 12th century seems to have been fused with the textual persona "Trotula". In contrast to the wide popularity of the Trotula texts—which are found in nearly 140 extant copies of the Latin originals, and about 60 copies of vernacular translations—the authentic works of Trota survive in only a handful of copies. Hence, in modern scholarship, it is crucial to separate the historical woman Trota from the fate of the Trotula texts, because their historical importance and impact were quite distinct. Debates about whether "Trotula" really existed began in the 16th century, generated in part out of the inherent inconsistencies in the assembled work that circulated under "her" name. Those debates persisted into the later 20th century, when the discovery of Trota's Practica secundum Trotam ("Practical Medicine According to Trota") and philological analysis of other works associated with her allowed the real historic woman Trota to be seen independently from the textual creation "Trotula".

== Life and works ==
No independent biographical information on Trota of Salerno exists beyond information that can be gleaned from writings associated with her. That information allows us to place her sometime in the first half of the 12th century. Additionally, a comprehensive concordance of all textual witnesses to Trota's writings and practices, published in 2007, allows an estimation of the full scope of her work. It is likely that she wrote more than can yet be documented by extant witnesses. In the 12th and 15th centuries, the Trota's texts were repeatedly published in various cities and had a broad audience throughout western Europe despite the competition of other texts focusing on gynecology and women's health.

She also promoted ways of living a healthy and long life. She advocated the incorporation of exercise, good diet, low stress, and cleanliness into daily living. Trotula also wrote content on how to take care of personal hygiene and care, including lessons about make-up and suggestions on how to stay unwrinkled, remove puffiness from the face and eyes, remove unwanted hair from the body, lighten the skin, hide blemishes and freckles, clean teeth and take away bad breath, dye hair, remove hair by waxing, and care for lips and gums.

=== Practica secundum Trotam (Practical Medicine According to Trota) ===
The work that Trota is most immediately associated with as author is the Practica secundum Trotam ("Practical Medicine According to Trota"), which covers a variety of different medical topics, from infertility and menstrual disorders to snakebite and cosmetics. Trota was a famous authority on obstetrics and a renowned midwife in Salerno. Although her works are known for their practical information on gynecology and obstetrics, Trota also wrote on medical problems faced by both men and women. In her practical book of medicine, Practica Secundum Trotum, she dedicated about three quarters of the text to ailments that are not specific to women, such as internal diseases, fevers, and wounds. This illustrates that Trota was not limited to problems in gynecology or obstetrics when treating her patients.

Trota's writings included radical ideas that were not common in that time, claiming that both men and women were responsible for failure in conception. This daring statement that questioned a man's ability to reproduce caused a lot of controversy about her work. Her work also included a variety of advice on conception, menstruation, caesarian sections, and childbirth. Most of her texts were written for male doctors to educate themselves about the female body since all the works at the time were written by men who had no experience with treating women and their medical issues. These written works were used centuries after they were published, as they paved the way to the pre-modern treatment towards women's medical issues.

The Practica was first discovered in 1985 by California Institute of Technology historian John F. Benton. Benton found the text in a Madrid manuscript likely written at the very beginning of the 13th century. A second, partial copy of the text was discovered by Monica H. Green in a manuscript now in Oxford. In 1995, Piero Cantalupo published a complete transcription of the original Latin text in the Madrid manuscript; no complete translation into English has yet been published.

=== De curis mulierum (On Treatments for Women) ===
Trota is also the authoritative figure behind one of three texts in the so-called Trotula ensemble, a compendium of works on women's medicine brought together later in the 12th century. This is the text known as De curis mulierum ("On Treatments for Women"). Trota cannot properly be called the "author" of this text, or at least not in the form in which it has survived, because she is cited within the text in the third person. Trota appears in an anecdote about a young woman suffering from ventositas matricis ("wind in the uterus"). As the text explains, sometimes women "take in wind" into their uterus, "with the result that to certain people they look as if they were ruptured or suffering from intestinal pain." Trota was called in to treat a woman suffering from the condition. The text stressed that "Trota was called in as if she were a master." The Latin word for "master" here is in the feminine form, magistra, the most compelling sign that Trota had a social stature comparable to that of male magistri.

This treatment of "wind" in the uterus has no other parallel with known works coming out of Salerno. But much of the rest of the text of De curis mulierum has strong echoes of practices of Trota's known from the Practica secundum Trotam.

The third-person reference to Trota's cure raises the question of who the "we" is that is seen throughout most of the text of De curis mulierum. Green posits that the text seems to capture the collective practices of one group of female practitioners, setting down their cures for another group of readers (or auditors) who will have the same unfettered access to the bodies of their female patients: "it appears to have been written down to provide a more permanent and concrete mechanism for the transmission of knowledge from woman to woman than the oral forms that had traditionally served the needs of Salernitan women.... [T]he text posits a community of female readers who would be able to rely on this text for instruction..." Women's literacy is not well documented in southern Italy in this period, which raises the question of why the De curis mulierum was written down in the first place. Green finds a clue to this question in the three words of English derivation found in the earliest copies of the text. The De curis mulierum may have been written down, she suggests, not for the benefit of local women in Salerno, but for an audience in England eager in general to learn about medical practices in far-off Salerno. Both England and southern Italy were under Norman rule at this point, and transference of southern Italian medical writings to Normandy and especially England are well-documented in this period. In fact, the manuscript where we find the earliest copy of the original version of the De curis mulierum—Oxford, Bodleian Library, MS Digby 79, from the early 13th century—seems to have been written both in Italy and in England.

== Reputation and the medieval fate of her writings ==
The anecdote of Trota's cure of the young woman with "wind" in her womb is already an indication of the fame she enjoyed in her own community. To be likened to a male master of medicine in being called a "magistra operis" was a notable accomplishment, especially since the feminine form magistra is hardly documented at all in this period. Further evidence of the healer Trota has, however, not yet been found in Salernitan documents. No male Salernitan medical writers from the period cite her by name, and although many women named Trota (or "Trocta") are mentioned in Salernitan documents, it is impossible to identify this specific Trota with any one of them. Trota, for her part, mentions a couple of her male contemporaries. In Treatments for Women, there are two references to the Salernitan physician Copho: in one case, she refers clearly to a doctrinal point of Copho's anatomical teaching. In another instance, she (or someone who edited her text) seems to borrow extensively from Copho's analysis of the causes of, and therapies for, infertility. Additionally, Trota seems to credit a "golden unguent" for treating lesions of the penis to master Ferrarius. Trota, therefore, had an awareness of the work of her male contemporaries, so it is notable that they do not reciprocate. The several mentions by male writers of the practices of the mulieres Salernitane ("the women of Salerno") as an undifferentiated group seem only occasionally to capture the kinds of therapies Trota practiced.

=== The Dame Trote ===
A lasting record of her fame is more easily found in northern Europe. A thirteenth-century Anglo-Norman cosmetic text, Ornatus mulierum (On the Adornment of Women), refers to "Dame Trote" twelve times. Indeed, the author actually claims to have studied with Trota, and she is the only woman cited by name as a source for information. As Green has suggested, Trota's international esteem may itself have led to the creation of Treatments for Women, which, as noted above, shows signs of having been assembled by an English-speaking visitor to Salerno.

=== The Codex Salernitanus ===
Trota's status as a medical author is most strikingly documented by a work found uniquely in a late 12th-century manuscript, the Codex Salernitanus, that was held in the city library of the Polish town of Wrocław (Breslau). How the manuscript arrived in Poland is unclear, since it seems (based on the handwriting of its scribes) to have been written in France. Wrocław, Stadtbibliothek, MS 1302, was destroyed in bombing during World War II, but major portions of it had been published in the previous century. The manuscript contains a work there called De egritudinum curatione, On the Treatment of Illnesses. The work is a compilation of therapies from seven Salernitan writers, identified in marginal notes such as "M.C." for magister Copho ("master Copho"). We know now that the passages attributed to a name abbreviated as "Trot'" should be recognized as the work of Trota of Salerno. In fact, it is likely that she was responsible for additional passages in the text that had no attribution.

The Salernitan De egritudinum curatione seems never to have been copied again after the Codex Salernitanus was assembled, nor did the Practica secundum Trotam receive much circulation. Hence, knowledge of Trota outside of what was preserved in the Trotula texts faded. At some point in the thirteenth century, memory that "Trota" was the actual woman's name was lost, and scribes began inserting "Trotula" into the passage describing Trota's cure in the Treatments for Women. At the same time, lore about "Trotula" as an "expert on women's affairs" continued to grow, both positively in the rising prominence of the Trotula texts sources for knowledge on women's medicine (they circulated not only in Latin but also in multiple new translations into European vernacular languages), but also negatively, as "Trotula" was used as a mouthpiece to articulate misogynistic views (for example, in the Prologue to Chaucer's The Wife of Bath's Tale).

=== Erasure of the feminine Trota ===
The Trotula works fell into the hands of Georg Kraut in 1544, who rearranged the three component texts to appear as though it was authored by a single person. He also removed the mention of common names beyond the third century, which led future readers and publishers to assume it was an ancient text. Later, in the sixteenth century, Casper Wolf, who acted as the next editor of Trotula, changed the name from Trotula to Eros (a male name) and edited a verbal form from feminine to masculine to agree with the name change. This falsely accredited the text to a man and placed it in the ancient period, contributing to the erasure of a woman author in the Middle Ages. Throughout scholarship of the Trotula, historians, researchers, and philologists have dismissed her authorship, gender, and medical knowledge on various grounds. For example, in 1773, Gruner dismissed Trota's possible authorship of the texts because she was mentioned within the text, not specifically as the author; instead, he referred to the author as a masculine unknown. Often, the time period, gender, author attribution, and/or Trota's believed level of education are downplayed, upgraded, or dismissed based on the bias of the scholar or the purpose of their research.

Although Trota is not frequently connected to Hildegard of Bingen, another female author and practitioner of medicine in the 12th century, in academic writing, Green draws parallels between their lives and the future of their texts. First, both women were renowned for their authority on certain medical subjects during and after their time. Later, specifically the Renaissance and the modern period, their works were studied by historians, philologists, and physicians, who often questioned the legitimacy of or contributed to the erasure of their authorship or medical knowledge.

=== "Trota" in a copy of De curis mulierum ===
One very interesting exception to this general erasure of the historic Trota has recently been discovered. The Catalan historian of medicine, Montserrat Cabré i Pairet, has discovered a partial 15th-century Catalan translation of the De curis mulierum, the only one of the three Trotula texts to have preserved the original teaching of Trota. The scribe of the manuscript (who may have been a surgeon copying the text for whose own use) apparently compared the Catalan translation with a copy that who found of the original Latin De curis mulierum, recording that, in the original Latin, the maestra who had been called in was called Trota "in the Latin".

This singular acknowledgement of Trota's fame aside, overall, recognition of the historic Trota had all but disappeared by the end of the Middle Ages. This led to controversy about the authorship of Trotula, which directed medical scholarship on the texts for the next 400 years, starting in the sixteenth century.

== Rediscovery in the 20th and 21st centuries ==
The Codex Salernitanus, that large collection of Salernitan texts, was first brought to the notice of modern scholars in 1837, and the text of De egritudinum curatione—On the Treatment of Illness—was first published two decades later. In the early 20th century, the Leipzig historian of medicine, Karl Sudhoff, had a stream of medical students edit (or re-edit) different texts from the Codex Salernitanus. In 1921, Conrad Hiersemann chose to re-edit the sections of the De egritudinum curatione ascribed to "Trot'". Hiersemann assumed that the name was masculine, and so expanded it to "Trottus". This erasure of the female author Trota was not questioned until 1985, when John F. Benton, a historian at the California Institute of Technology, discovered the Practica secundum Trotam, the text in the manuscript in Madrid. Benton realized that the Practica had multiple overlaps with therapies ascribed to "Trot'" in the De egritudinum curatione. He was thus able to retrieve the historic woman Trota from the oblivion into which she had fallen for 800 years.

However, Benton persisted in his belief that the Trotula texts—which he had proven were originally the work of three separate 12th-century writers—were all male-authored and had nothing to do with the real Trota. What Benton did not realize was that the Practica secundum Trotam also had multiple overlaps with the second of the three Trotula texts, the De curis mulierum (On Treatments for Women). That discovery was made by Monica H. Green, a historian of medieval women's medicine. In 2007, Green established the overlaps and parallels between all four texts witnessing any part of Trota's work: the Salernitan De egritudinum curatione; Practica secundum Trotam; De curis mulierum; and certain cosmetic practices attributed to "Dame Trote" in the Anglo-Norman cosmetic text. Together, these works suggest that Trota's skill extended to most areas of medical practice, save general surgery.

Green was not optimistic, however, about what this collected evidence for Trota has to say about the status of women in medicine in 12th-century Salerno. She sees Trota as being on the very edge of literate traditions in medicine: Trota cites no authoritative sources (like Hippocrates or Galen), and there is little by way of physiological theory or explanation of the causes of disease. Green concludes: "Trota did succeed in establishing her stature 'in the forum' as an empiricist. But as a theorist who could impart doctrinae [formal teachings] to students, she had no impact at all." Indeed, Green sees the story of Trota as emblematic of the marginal status of women in the changing spheres of intellectual life in Europe in the 12th century, when universities were first taking hold. We have evidence of other female medical practitioners in southern Italy in the centuries after Trota. However, none of these women are known to have authored medical texts.

== See also ==
- List of women scientists before the 20th century
- Trotula
- Women of Salerno
- Women in science
- Women in medicine
