= Trotula =

Three 12th-century texts on women's medicine

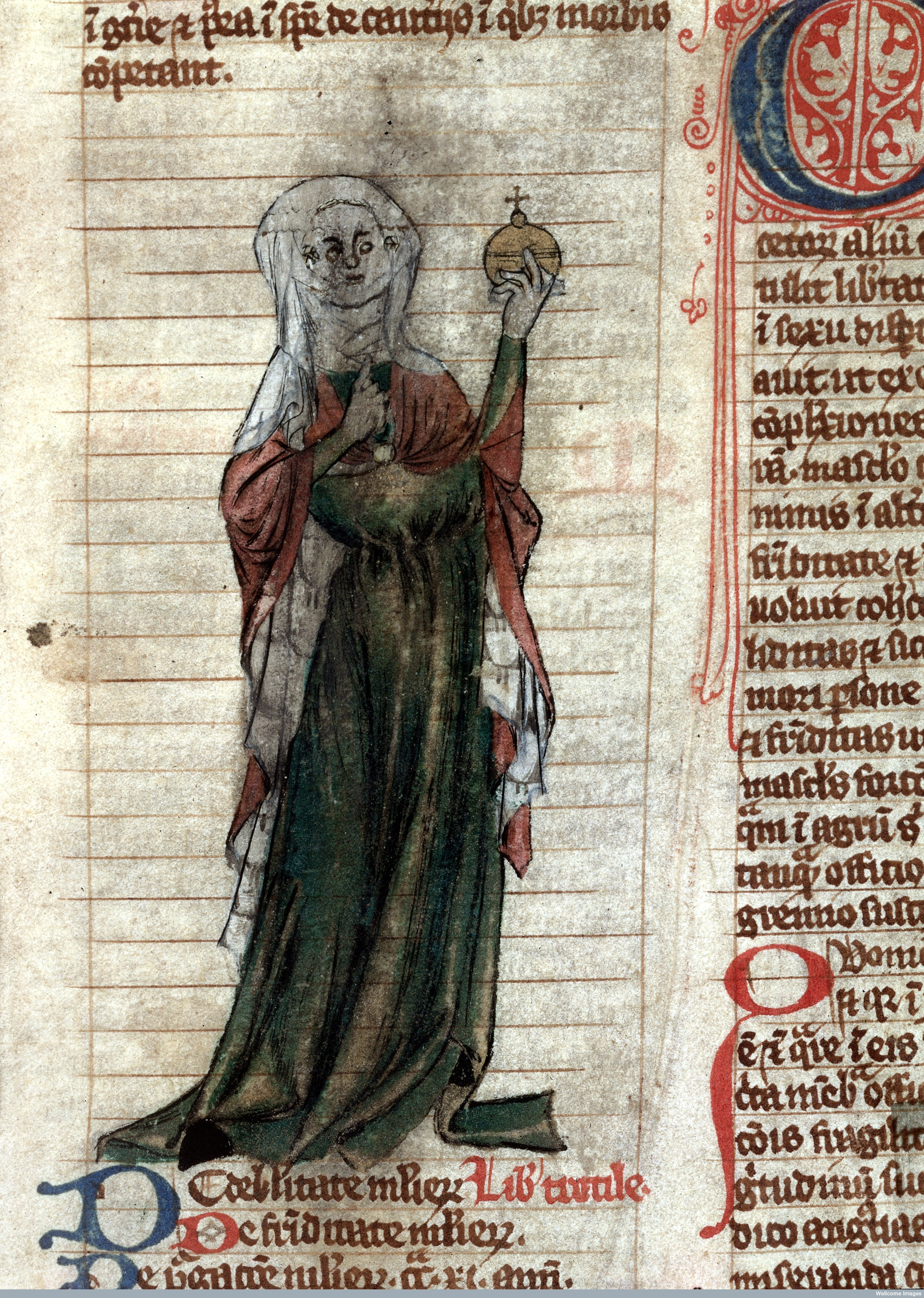
London, Wellcome Library, MS 544 (Miscellanea medica XVIII), early 14th century (France), a copy of the intermediate Trotula ensemble, p. 65 (detail): pen and wash drawing meant to depict "Trotula", clothed in red and green with a white headdress, holding an orb

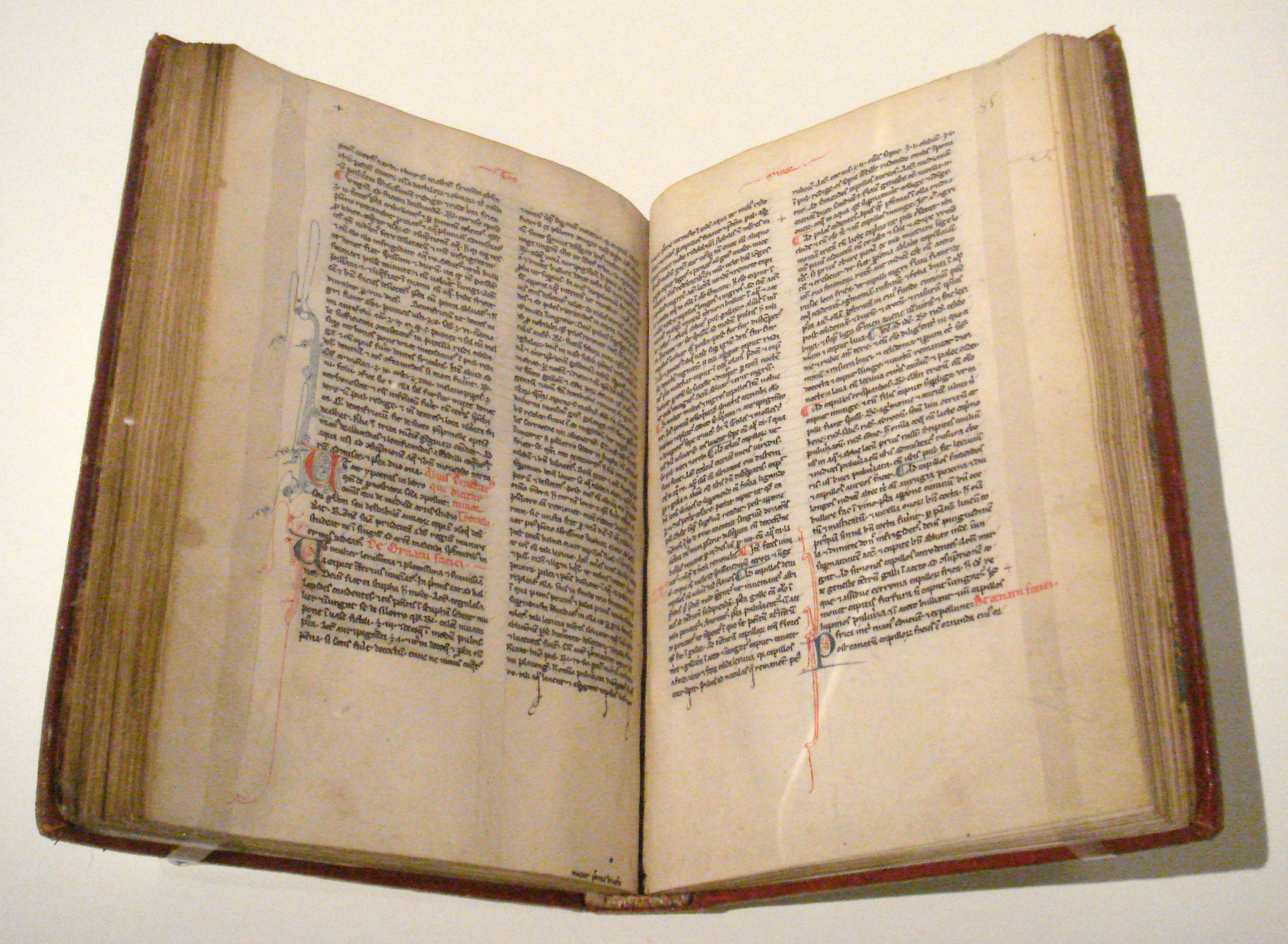
Trotula transitional ensemble, Paris, Bibliothèque nationale de France, MS lat. 7056, mid-13th century, ff. 84v-85r, opening of the De ornatu mulierum

Trotula is a name referring to a group of three texts on women's medicine that were composed in the southern Italian port town of Salerno in the 12th century. The name derives from a historic female figure, Trota of Salerno, a physician and medical writer who was associated with one of the three texts. However, "Trotula" came to be understood as a real person in the Middle Ages and because the so-called Trotula texts circulated widely throughout medieval Europe, from Spain to Poland, and Sicily to Ireland, "Trotula" has historic importance in "her" own right.

== The Trotula texts: genesis and authorship ==
In the 12th century, the southern Italian port town of Salerno was widely reputed as "the most important center for the introduction of Arabic medicine into Western Europe". In referring to the School of Salerno in the 12th century, historians mean a school in the sense of a school of thought: an informal community of masters and pupils who, over the course of the 12th century, developed more or less formal methods of instruction and investigation; there is no evidence of any physical or legal entity before the 13th century.

Conditions of Women, Treatments for Women, and Women's Cosmetics are usually referred to collectively as The Trotula. They cover topics from childbirth to cosmetics, relying on varying sources from Galen to oral traditions, providing practical instructions. These works vary in both organization and content. Conditions of Women and Women's Cosmetics circulated anonymously until they were combined with Treatments for Women sometime in the late 12th century. For the next several hundred years, the Trotula ensemble circulated throughout Europe, reaching its greatest popularity in the 14th century. More than 130 copies exist today of the Latin texts, and over 60 copies of the many medieval vernacular translations.

=== Liber de sinthomatibus mulierum ("Book on the Conditions of Women") ===
The Liber de sinthomatibus mulierum ("Book on the Conditions of Women") was novel in its adoption of the new Arabic medicine that had just begun to make inroads into Europe. As Green demonstrated in 1996, Conditions of Women draws heavily on the gynecological and obstetrical chapters of the Viaticum, Constantine the African's Latin translation of Ibn al-Jazzar's Arabic Zad al-musafir, which had been completed in the late 11th century. Arabic medicine was more speculative and philosophical, drawing from the principles of Galen. Galen, as opposed to other notable physicians, believed that menstruation was a necessary and healthy purgation. Galen asserted that women are colder than men and unable to "cook" their nutrients; thus they must eliminate excess substance through menstruation. Indeed, the author presents a positive view of the role of menstruation in women's health and fertility: "Menstrual blood is special because it carries in it a living being. It works like a tree. Before bearing fruit, a tree must first bear flowers. Menstrual blood is like the flower: it must emerge before the fruit—the baby—can be born." Another condition that the author addresses at length is suffocation of the womb; this results from, among other causes, an excess of female semen (another Galenic idea). Seemingly conflicted between two different theoretical positions—one that suggested it was possible for the womb to "wander" within the body, and another which saw such movement as anatomically impossible—the author seems to admit the possibility that the womb rises to the respiratory organs. Other issues discussed at length are treatment for and the proper regimen for a newly born child. There are discussions on topics covering menstrual disorders and uterine prolapse, chapters on childbirth and pregnancy, in addition to many others. All the named authorities cited in the Liber de sinthomatibus mulierum are male: Hippocrates, Oribasius, Dioscorides, Paulus, and Justinus.

=== De curis mulierum ("On Treatments for Women") ===
De curis mulierum ("On Treatments for Women") is the only one of the three Trotula texts that is actually attributed to the Salernitan practitioner Trota of Salerno when it circulated as an independent text. However, it has been argued that it is perhaps better to refer to Trota as the "authority" who stands behind this text than its actual author. The author does not provide theories related to gynecological conditions or their causes, but simply informs the reader how to prepare and apply medical preparations. There is a lack of cohesion, but there are sections related to gynecological, andrological, pediatric, cosmetic, and general medical conditions. Beyond a pronounced focus on treatment for fertility, there is a range of pragmatic instructions like how to "restore" virginity, as well as treatments for concerns such as difficulties with bladder control and cracked lips caused by too much kissing. In a work stressing female medical issues, remedies for men's disorders are included as well.

=== De ornatu mulierum ("On Women's Cosmetics") ===
De ornatu mulierum ("On Women's Cosmetics") is a treatise that teaches how to conserve and improve women's beauty. It opens with a preface (later omitted from the Trotula ensemble) in which the author refers to himself with a masculine pronoun and explains his ambition to earn "a delightful multitude of friends" by assembling this body of learning on care of the hair (including bodily hair), face, lips, teeth, mouth, and (in the original version) the genitalia. As Green has noted, the author likely hoped for a wide audience, for he observed that women beyond the Alps would not have access to the spas that Italian women did and therefore included instructions for an alternative steam bath. The author does not claim that the preparations he describes are his own inventions. One therapy that he claims to have personally witnessed, was created by a Sicilian woman, and he added another remedy on the same topic (mouth odor) which he himself endorses. Otherwise, the rest of the text seems to gather together remedies learned from empirical practitioners: he explicitly describes ways that he has incorporated "the rules of women whom I found to be practical in practicing the art of cosmetics." But while women may have been his sources, they were not his immediate audience: he presented his highly structured work for the benefit of other male practitioners eager, like himself, to profit from their knowledge of making women beautiful.

Six times in the original version of the text, the author credits specific practices to Muslim women, whose cosmetic practices are known to have been imitated by Christian women on Sicily. And the text overall presents an image of an international market of spices and aromatics regularly traded in the Islamic world. Frankincense, cloves, cinnamon, nutmeg, and galangal are all used repeatedly. More than the other two texts that would make up the Trotula ensemble, the De ornatu mulierum seems to capture both the empiricism of local southern Italian culture and the rich material culture made available as the Norman kings of southern Italy embraced Islamic culture on Sicily.

== The Medieval legacy of the Trotula ==
The Trotula texts are considered the "most popular assembly of materials on women's medicine from the late twelfth through the fifteenth centuries." The nearly 200 extant manuscripts (Latin and vernacular) of the Trotula represent only a small portion of the original number that circulated around Europe from the late 12th century to the end of the 15th century. Certain versions of the Trotula enjoyed a pan-European circulation. These works reached their peak popularity in Latin around the turn of the 14th century. The many medieval vernacular translations carried the texts' popularity into the 15th century and, in Germany and England, the 16th.

=== Circulation in Latin ===
All three Trotula texts circulated for several centuries as independent texts. Each is found in several different versions, likely due to the interventions of later editors or scribes. Already by the late 12th century, however, one or more anonymous editors recognized the inherent relatedness of the three independent Salernitan texts on women's medicine and cosmetics, and so brought them together into a single ensemble. In all, when she surveyed the entire extant corpus of Trotula manuscripts in 1996, Green identified eight different versions of the Latin Trotula ensemble. These versions differ sometimes in wording, but more obviously by the addition, deletion, or rearrangement of certain material. The so-called "standardized ensemble" reflects the most mature stage of the text, and it seemed especially attractive in university settings. A survey of known owners of the Latin Trotula in all its forms showed it not simply in the hands of learned physicians throughout western and central Europe, but also in the hands of monks in England, Germany, and Switzerland; surgeons in Italy and Catalonia; and even certain kings of France and England.

=== Medieval vernacular translations ===
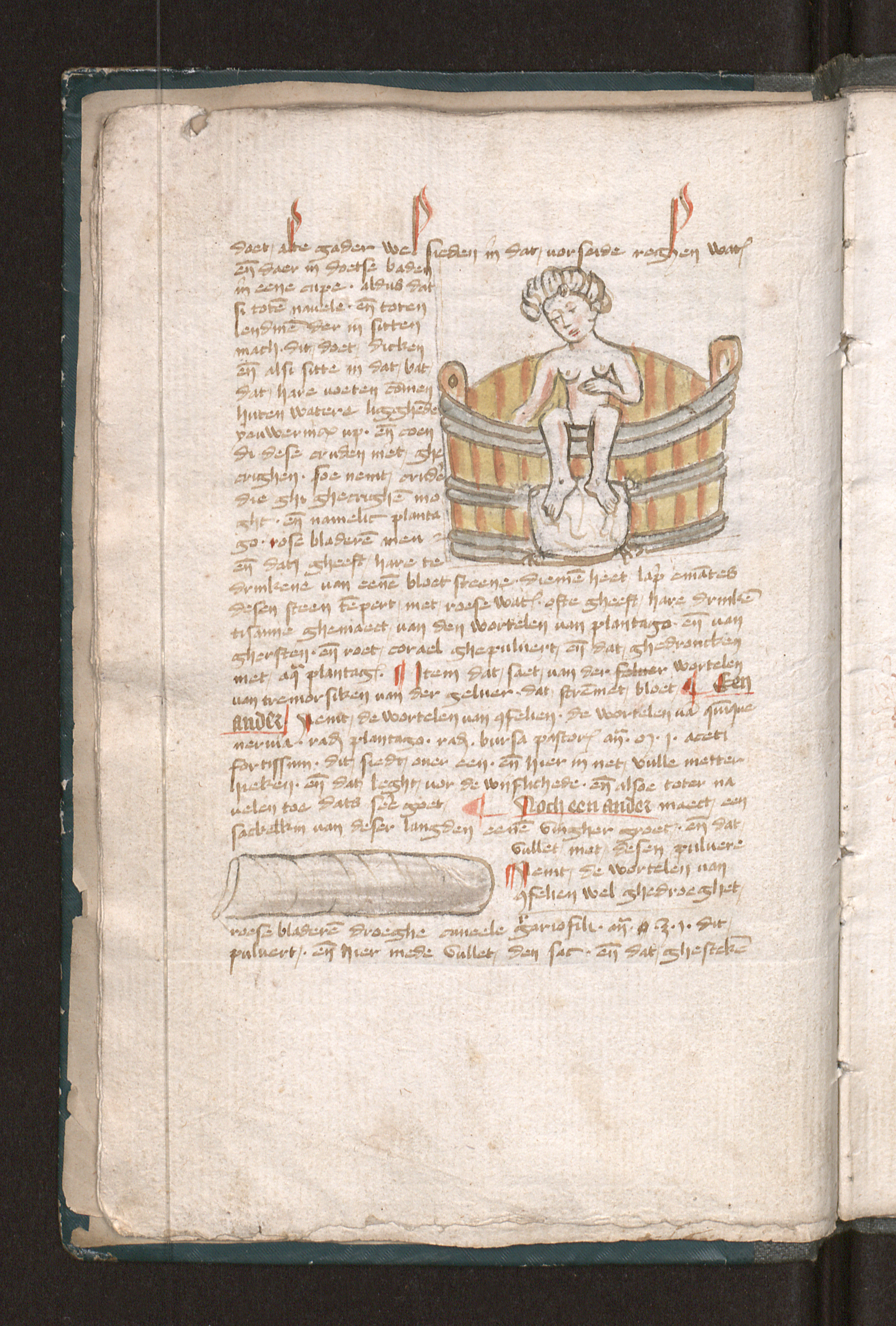
Illustration of a woman taking a therapeutic bath and of a medicinal tampon in a 15th-century copy of the Middle Dutch translation of the Trotula (Bruges, Public Library, Ms. 593)

The trend toward using vernacular languages for medical writing began in the 12th century, and grew increasingly in the later Middle Ages. The many vernacular translations of the Trotula were therefore part of a general trend. The first known translation was into Hebrew, made somewhere in southern France in the late 12th century. The next translations, in the 13th century, were into Anglo-Norman and Old French. And in the 14th and 15th centuries, there are translations in Dutch, Middle English, French (again), German, Irish, and Italian. Most recently, a Catalan translation of one of the Trotula texts has been discovered in a 15th-century medical miscellany, held by the Biblioteca Riccardiana in Florence. This fragmentary translation of the De curis mulierum is here collated by the copyist (probably a surgeon making a copy for his own use) with a Latin version of the text, highlighting the differences.

The existence of vernacular translations suggests that the Trotula texts were finding new audiences. Almost assuredly they were, but not necessarily women. Only seven of the nearly two dozen medieval translations are explicitly addressed to female audiences, and even some of those translations were co-opted by male readers. The first documented female owner of a copy of the Trotula is Dorothea Susanna von der Pfalz, Duchess of Saxony-Weimar (1544–92), who had made for her own use a copy of Johannes Hartlieb's paired German translations of the pseudo-Albertus Magnus Secrets of Women and Das Buch Trotula.

=== "Trotula's" fame in the Middle Ages ===
Medieval readers of the Trotula texts would have had no reason to doubt the attribution they found in the manuscripts, and so "Trotula" (assuming they understood the word as a personal name instead of a title) was accepted as an authority on women's medicine. The physician Petrus Hispanus (mid-13th century), for example, cited "domina Trotula" (Lady Trotula) multiple times in his section on women's gynecological and obstetrical conditions. The Amiens chancellor, poet, and physician, Richard de Fournival (d. 1260), commissioned a copy headed "Incipit liber Trotule sanatricis Salernitane de curis mulierum" ("Here begins the book of Trotula, the Salernitan female healer, on treatments for women"). Two copies of the Latin Trotula ensemble include imaginative portrayals of the author; the pen-and-ink wash image found in an early 14th-century manuscript now held by the Wellcome Library is the most well-known image of "Trotula" (see image above). A few 13th-century references to "Trotula", however, cite her only as an authority on cosmetics. The belief that "Trotula" was the ultimate authority on the topic of women's medicine even caused works authored by others to be attributed to her, such as a 15th-century Middle English compendium on gynecology and obstetrics based on the works of the male authors Gilbertus Anglicus and Muscio, which in one of its four extant copies was called the Liber Trotularis. Similarly, a 14th-century Catalan author entitled his work primarily focused on women's cosmetics Lo libre ... al qual a mes nom Trotula ("The Book ... which is called 'Trotula'").

Alongside "her" role as a medical authority, "Trotula" came to serve a new function starting in the 13th century: that of a mouthpiece for misogynous views on the nature of women. In part, this was connected to a general trend to acquire information about the "secrets of women", that is, the processes of generation. When the Munich physician Johannes Hartlieb (d. 1468) made a German translation of the Trotula, he not only elevated "Trotula's" status to that of a queen, but also paired the text with the pseudo-Albertan Secrets of Women. A text called Placides and Timeus attributed to "Trotula" a special authority both because of what she "felt in herself, since she was a woman", and because "all women revealed their inner thoughts more readily to her than to any man and told her their natures." Geoffrey Chaucer is echoing this attitude when he includes "Trotula's" name in his "Book of Wicked Wives", a collection of anti-matrimonial and misogynous tracts owned by the Wife of Bath's fifth husband, Jankyn, as told in The Wife of Bath's Tale (Prologue, (D), 669–85) of The Canterbury Tales.

== The modern legacy of the Trotula ==
=== Renaissance editions of the Trotula and early debates about authorship ===
The Trotula texts first appeared in print in 1544, quite late in the trend toward printing, which for medical texts had begun in the 1470s. The Trotula was published not because it was still of immediate clinical use to learned physicians (it had been superseded in that role by a variety of other texts in the 15th century), but because it had been newly "discovered" as a witness to empirical medicine by a Strasbourg publisher, Johannes Schottus. Schottus persuaded a physician colleague, Georg Kraut, to edit the Trotula, which Schottus then included in a volume he called Experimentarius medicinae ("Collection of Tried-and-True Remedies of Medicine"), which also included the Physica of Trota of Salerno's near contemporary, Hildegard of Bingen. Kraut, seeing the disorder in the texts, but not recognizing that it was really the work of three separate authors, rearranged the entire work into 61 themed chapters. He also took the liberty of altering the text here and there. As Green has noted, "The irony of Kraut's attempt to endow 'Trotula' with a single, orderly, fully rationalized text was that, in the process, he was to obscure for the next 400 years the distinctive contributions of the historic woman Trota."

Kraut (and his publisher, Schottus) retained the attribution of the text(s) to "Trotula". In fact, in applying a singular new title—Trotulae curandarum aegritudinum muliebrium ante, in, & postpartum Liber ("The Book of Trotula on the Treatment of the Diseases of Women before, during, and after Birth")—Kraut and Schottus proudly emphasized "Trotula's" feminine identity. Schottus praised her as "a woman by no means of the common sort, but rather one of great experience and erudition." In his "cleaning up" of the text, Kraut had suppressed all obvious hints that this was a medieval text rather than an ancient one. When the text was next printed, in 1547 (all subsequent printings of the Trotula would recycle Kraut's edition), it appeared in a collection called Medici antiqui omnes qui latinis litteris diversorum morborum genera & remedia persecuti sunt, undique conquisiti ("[The Writings of] All Ancient Latin Physicians Who Described and Collected the Types and Remedies of Various Diseases"). From then until the 18th century, the Trotula was treated as if it were an ancient text. As Green notes, "'Trotula', therefore, in contrast to Hildegard, survived the scrutiny of Renaissance humanists because she was able to escape her medieval associations. But it was this very success that would eventually 'unwoman' her. When the Trotula was reprinted in eight further editions between 1550 and 1572, it was not because it was the work of a woman but because it was the work of an antiquissimus auctor ("a very ancient author")."

"Trotula" was "unwomaned" in 1566 by Hans Caspar Wolf, who was the first to incorporate the Trotula into a collection of gynecological texts. Wolf emended the author's name from "Trotula" to Eros, a freed male slave of the Roman empress Julia: "The book of women's matters of Eros, physician [and] freedman of Julia, whom some have absurdly named 'Trotula'" (Erotis medici liberti Iuliae, quem aliqui Trotulam inepte nominant, muliebrium liber). The idea came from Hadrianus Junius (Aadrian DeJonghe, 1511–1575), a Dutch physician who believed that textual corruptions accounted for many false attributions of ancient texts. As Green has noted, however, even though the erasure of "Trotula" was more an act of humanist editorial zeal than blatant misogyny, the fact that there were now no female authors left in the emerging canon of writers on gynecology and obstetrics was never noted.

=== Modern debates about authorship and "Trotula's" existence ===
If "Trotula" as a female author had no use to humanist physicians, that was not necessarily true of other intellectuals. In 1681, the Italian historian Antonio Mazza resurrected "Trotula" in his Historiarum Epitome de rebus salernitanis ("Epitome of the Histories of Salerno"). Here is the origin of the belief that "Trotula" held a chair at the university of Salerno: "There flourished in the fatherland, teaching at the university [studium] and lecturing from their professorial chairs, Abella, Mercuriadis, Rebecca, Trotta (whom some people call "Trotula"), all of whom ought to be celebrated with marvelous encomia (as Tiraqueau has noted), as well as Sentia Guarna (as Fortunatus Fidelis has said)." Green has suggested that this fiction (Salerno had no university in the 12th century, so there were no professorial chairs for men or women) may have been due to the fact that three years earlier, "Elena Cornaro received a doctorate in philosophy at Padua, the first formal Ph.D. ever awarded to a woman. Mazza, concerned to document the glorious history of his patria, Salerno, may have been attempting to show that Padua could not claim priority in having produced female professors."

In 1773 in Jena, C. G. Gruner challenged the idea that the Trotula was an ancient text, but he also dismissed the idea that "Trotula" could have been the text's author (working with Kraut's edition, he, too, thought it was a single text) since she was cited internally. (This is the story of Trota of Salerno's cure of the woman with "wind" in the womb in the De curis mulierum.) And so the stage was set for debates about "Trotula" in the 19th and 20th centuries. For those who wanted a representative of Salernitan excellence and/or female achievement, "she" could be reclaimed from the humanists' erasure. For skeptics (and there were many grounds for skepticism), it was easy to find cause for doubt that there was really any female medical authority behind this chaotic text. This was the state of affairs in the 1970s, when second-wave feminism discovered "Trotula" anew. The inclusion of "Trotula" as an invited guest at Judy Chicago's feminist art installation, The Dinner Party (1974–79), insured that the debate would continue.

=== The reclamation of Trota of Salerno in modern scholarship ===
From 1544 up through the 1970s, all claims about an alleged author "Trotula", pro or con, were based on Georg Kraut's Renaissance printed text. But that was a fiction, in that it had erased all last signs that the Trotula had been compiled out of the works of three different authors. In 1985, California Institute of Technology historian John F. Benton published a study surveying previous thinking on the question of "Trotula's" association with the Trotula texts. That study was important for three major reasons. (1) Although some previous scholars had noted discrepancies between the printed Renaissance editions of the Trotula and the text(s) found in medieval manuscripts, Benton was the first to prove how extensive the Renaissance editor's emendations had been. This was not one text, and there was no "one" author. Rather, it was three different texts. (2) Benton dismantled several of the myths about "Trotula" that had been generated by 19th- and early 20th-century scholarship. For example, the epithet "de Ruggiero" attached to her name was sheer invention. Likewise, claims about her date of birth or death, or who "her" husband or sons were had no foundation. (3) Most importantly, Benton announced his discovery of the Practica secundum Trotam ("Practical Medicine According to Trota") in a manuscript now in Madrid, which established the historic Trota of Salerno's claim to have existed and been an author.

After Benton's death in 1988, Monica H. Green picked up the task of publishing a new translation of the Trotula that could be used by students and scholars of the history of medicine and medieval women. However, Benton's own discoveries had rendered irrelevant any further reliance on the Renaissance edition, so Green undertook a complete survey of all the extant Latin manuscripts of the Trotula and a new edition of the Trotula ensemble. Green has disagreed with Benton in his claim that all the Trotula treatises were male-authored. Specifically, while Green agrees with Benton that male authorship of the Conditions of Women and Women's Cosmetics is probable, Green has demonstrated that not simply is the De curis mulierum (On Treatments for Women) directly attributed to the historic Trota of Salerno in the earliest known version (where it was still circulating independently), but that the text shows clear parallels to passages in other works associated with Trota and suggests strongly an intimate access to the female patient's body that, given the cultural restrictions of the time, would have likely only been allowed to a female practitioner.

=== "Trotula's" fame in popular culture ===
Perhaps the best known popularization of "Trotula" was in the artwork The Dinner Party (1979) by Judy Chicago, now on permanent exhibit at the Brooklyn Museum of Art, which features a place setting for "Trotula". The depiction here (based on publications prior to Benton's discovery of Trota of Salerno in 1985) presents a conflation of alleged biographical details that are no longer accepted by scholars. Chicago's celebration of "Trotula" no doubt led to the proliferation of modern websites that mention her, many of which repeat without correction the discarded misunderstandings noted above. A clinic in Vienna and a street in modern Salerno and even a corona on the planet Venus have been named after "Trotula", all mistakenly perpetuating fictions about "her" derived from popularizing works like that of Chicago. Likewise, medical writers, in trying to indicate the history of women in their field, or the history of certain gynecological conditions, keep recycling outworn understandings of "Trotula" (or even inventing new misunderstandings). Nevertheless, Chicago's elevation of both "Trotula" and the real Trota's contemporary, the religious and medical writer Hildegard of Bingen, as important medical figures in 12th-century Europe, did flag the importance of how historical remembrances of these women were created. That it took close to twenty years for Benton and Green to extract the historic woman Trota from the composite text of the Trotula was a function of the complicated textual tradition and the broad proliferation of the texts in the Middle Ages. That it is taking even longer for popular understandings of Trota and "Trotula" to catch up with this scholarship, has raised the question whether celebrations of Women's History ought not include more recognition of the processes by which that record is discovered and assembled.

== See also ==
- Sator Square, mentioned in the Trotula manuscripts as a remedy

== Medieval Manuscripts of the Trotula Texts ==
Since Green's edition of the standardized Trotula ensemble appeared in 2001, many libraries have been making high-quality digital images available of their medieval manuscripts. The following is a list of manuscripts of the Trotula that are now available for online consultation. In addition to the shelfmark, the index number is given from either Green's 1996 handlist of Latin manuscripts of the Trotula texts, or Green's 1997 handlist of manuscripts of medieval vernacular translations.

Latin Manuscripts

Lat16: Cambridge, Trinity College, MS R.14.30 (903), ff. 187r-204v (new foliation, 74r-91v) (s. xiii ex., France): proto-ensemble (incomplete), http://sites.trin.cam.ac.uk/manuscripts/R_14_30/manuscript.php?fullpage=1

Lat24: Firenze [Florence], Biblioteca Laurenziana, Plut. 73, cod. 37, ff. 2r-41r (s. xiii^{2}, Italy): intermediate ensemble, http://www.internetculturale.it/jmms/iccuviewer/iccu.jsp?id=oai%3Ateca.bmlonline.it%3A21%3AXXXX%3APlutei%3AIT%253AFI0100_Plutei_73.37&mode=all&teca=Laurenziana+-+FI

Lat48: London, Wellcome Library, MS 517, Miscellanea Alchemica XII (formerly Phillipps 2946), ff. 129v–134r (s. xv ex., probably Flanders): proto-ensemble (extracts), http://search.wellcomelibrary.org/iii/encore/record/C__Rb1964315?lang=eng

Lat49: London, Wellcome Library, MS 544, Miscellanea Medica XVIII, pp. 65a-72b, 63a-64b, 75a-84a (s. xiv in., France): intermediate ensemble, http://wellcomelibrary.org/player/b19745588#?asi=0&ai=86&z=0.1815%2C0.5167%2C0.2003%2C0.1258&r=0. This is the copy that includes the well-known image of "Trotula" holding an orb.

Lat50: London, Wellcome Library, MS 548, Miscellanea Medica XXII, ff. 140r-145v (s. xv med., Germany or Flanders): standardized ensemble (selections), http://search.wellcomelibrary.org/iii/encore/record/C__Rb1926717?lang=eng

Lat81: Oxford, Pembroke College, MS 21, ff. 176r-189r (s. xiii ex., England): proto-ensemble (LSM only); DOM (fragment), http://digital-collections.pmb.ox.ac.uk/ms-21

Lat87: Paris, Bibliothèque Nationale de France, MS lat. 7056, ff. 77rb-86va; 97rb-100ra (s. xiii med., England or N. France): transitional ensemble (Group B); TEM (Urtext of LSM), http://gallica.bnf.fr/ark:/12148/btv1b9076918w

Lat113: Vatican, Biblioteca Apostolica Vaticana, MS Pal. lat. 1304 (3rd ms of 5 in codex), ff. 38r-45v, 47r-48v, 46r-v, 51r-v, 49r-50v (s. xiii^{2}, Italy): standardized ensemble: http://digi.ub.uni-heidelberg.de/diglit/bav_pal_lat_1304.

Vernacular Manuscripts

French

Fren1a: Cambridge, Trinity College, MS O.1.20 (1044), ff. 21rb-23rb (s. xiii^{2}, England): Les secres de femmes, ed. in Hunt 2011 (cited above), (see also Fren3 below)

Fren2IIa: Kassel, Murhardsche Bibliothek der Stadt und Landesbibliothek, 4° MS med. 1, ff. 16v-20v (ca. 1430-75), http://orka.bibliothek.uni-kassel.de/viewer/image/1297331763218/35/

Fren3a: Cambridge, Trinity College, MS O.1.20 (1044), ff. 216r–235v, s. xiii^{2} (England), ed. in Hunt, Anglo-Norman Medicine, II (1997), 76–107,

Irish

Ir1b: Dublin, Trinity College, MS 1436 (E.4.1), pp. 101–107 and 359b-360b (s. xv): https://www.isos.dias.ie/TCD/TCD_MS_1436.html

Italian

Ital2a: London, Wellcome Institute for the History of Medicine, MS 532, Miscellanea Medica II, ff. 64r-70v (ca. 1465): http://search.wellcomelibrary.org/iii/encore/record/C__Rb1893400?lang=eng
