= Matthaeus Platearius =

Italian physician

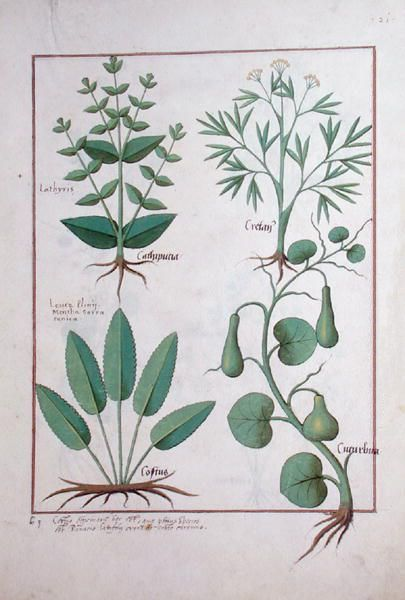
Euphorbia lathyris, Beechwort, Mint and Fig, from "The Book of Simple Medicines"

Matthaeus Platearius was a physician from the medical school at Salerno, and is thought to have produced a twelfth-century Latin manuscript on medicinal herbs titled "Circa Instans" (also known as "The Book of Simple Medicines"), later translated into French as "Le Livre des simples medecines". It was an alphabetic listing and textbook of simples that was based on Dioscorides "Vulgaris", which described the appearance, preparation, and uses of various drugs. It was widely acclaimed, and was one of the first herbals produced by the newly developed printing process in 1488. Ernst Meyer considered it equal to the herbals of Pliny and Dioscorides, while George Sarton thought it an improvement on "De Materia Medica".

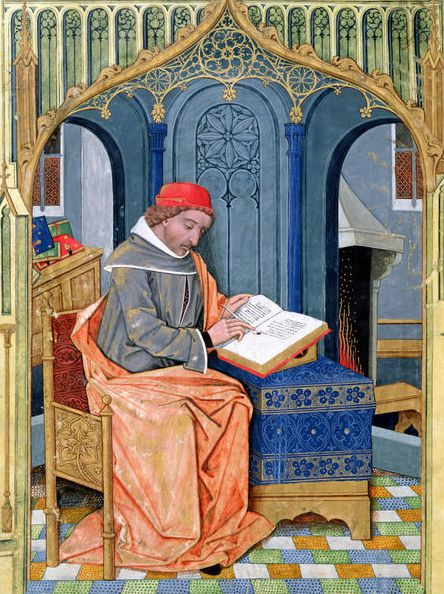
Robinet Testard's painting of Matthaeus Platearius writing "The Book of Simple Medicines"

Matthaeus and his brother Johannes were the sons of a female physician from the Salerno school who was married to Johannes Platearius I. She is surmised to be Trota, who wrote some important treatises on gynaecology including Diseases of Women.
