= Constance Calenda =

Italian surgeon (fl. 1415)

Constance Calenda (Italian: Costanza or Constanza Calenda; fl. 1415) was an Italian surgeon specializing in diseases of the eye. She studied at the University of Salerno, and was one of the women known as the "ladies of Salerno".

Calenda was the daughter of Salvator Calenda, the dean of the faculty of medicine at the University of Salerno c. 1415, and afterwards dean of the faculty at Naples. Constance, under the instruction of her father, seems to have obtained special honors for her medical examination. It is possible but unconfirmed that she obtained the degree of doctor of Medicine at the University of Naples.
