= Rebecca Guarna =

Italian physician (fl. 1200)

Rebecca Guarna (fl. 1200), was an Italian physician and surgeon and author. She is one of a number of female physicians known from the Middle Ages. She was one of the women known as the "ladies of Salerno".

Rebecca Guarna was a member of the same Salernitan family as the famous Romuald Guarna, priest, physician and historian. She studied at the University of Salerno and belonged to the minority of female students of her time period.

She was the author of De Urinis (on Urine), De febribus (on Fever) and De embrione (on the embryo): her treatise De Urinis treated the method of diagnosing illness by urine sample.
