= Medicine in the medieval Islamic world =

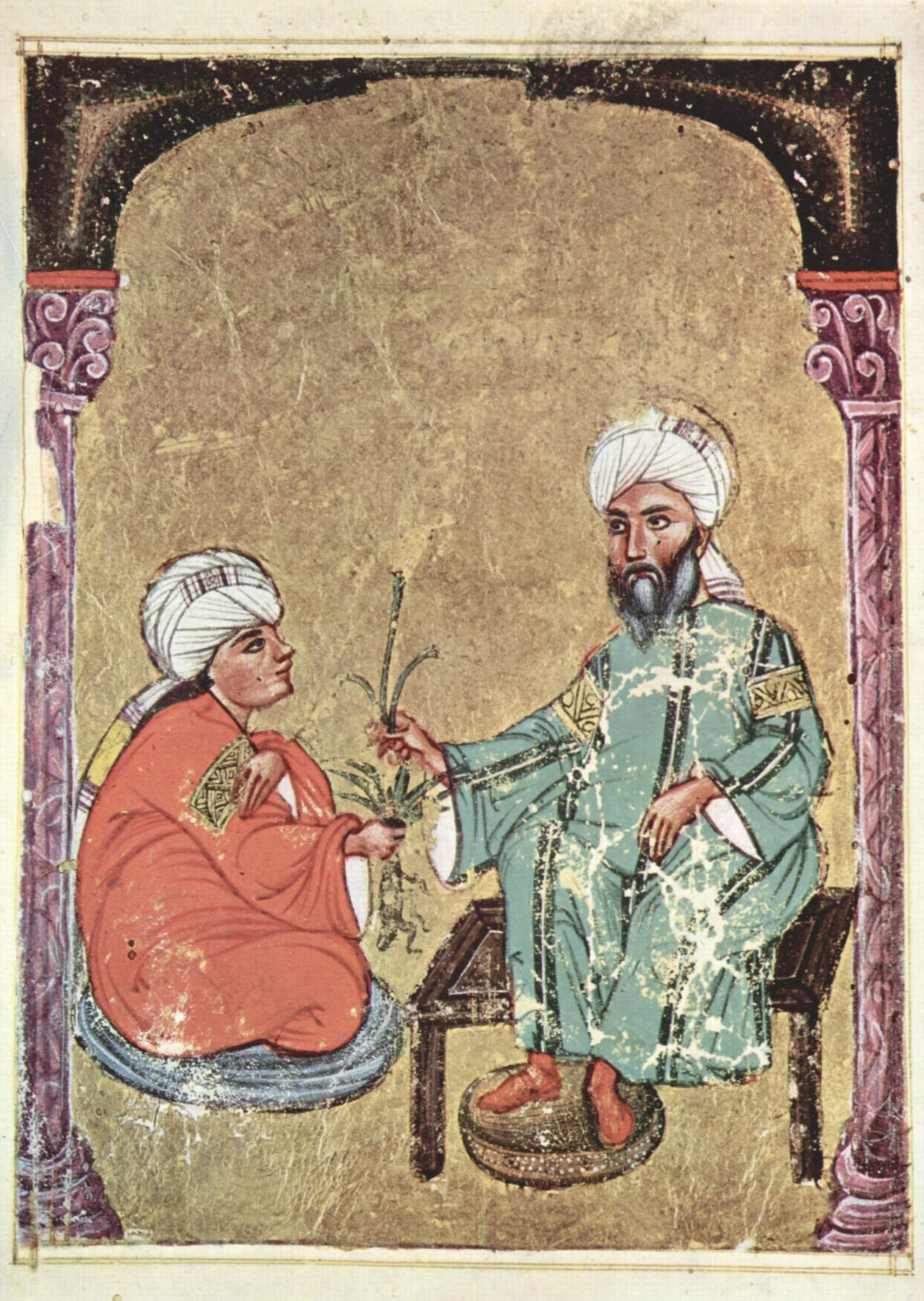
Folio from an Arabic manuscript of Dioscorides, De materia medica, 1229

In the history of medicine, "Islamic medicine", also known as "Arabian medicine", is the science of medicine developed in the Middle East, and usually written in Arabic, the lingua franca of Islamic civilization.

Islamic medicine adopted, systematized and developed the medical knowledge of classical antiquity, including the major traditions of Hippocrates, Galen and Dioscorides. During the post-classical era, Middle Eastern medicine was the most advanced in the world, integrating concepts of Modern Greek, Roman, Mesopotamian and Persian medicine as well as the ancient Indian tradition of Ayurveda, while making numerous advances and innovations. Islamic medicine, along with knowledge of classical medicine, was later adopted in the medieval medicine of Western Europe, after European physicians became familiar with Islamic medical authors during the Renaissance of the 12th century.

Medieval Islamic physicians largely retained their authority until the rise of medicine as a part of the natural sciences, beginning with the Age of Enlightenment, nearly six hundred years after their textbooks were opened by many people. Aspects of their writings remain of interest to physicians even today.

In the history of medicine, the term Islamic medicine, Arabic medicine, or Arab medicine refers to medicine produced by Islamic civilization and written in Arabic, the common language of communication during the Islamic civilization. Islamic medicine arose as a result of the interaction between traditional Arab medicine and external influences. The first translations of medical texts were a key factor in the formation of Islamic medicine.

Among the greatest of these physicians were Abu Bakr al-Razi and Ibn Sina, whose encyclopedic works were foundational to medical education in both the Islamic world and Europe. They were joined by other pioneers such as Al-Zahrawi, often regarded as the father of surgery, and Ibn al-Nafis, who was the first to describe the pulmonary circulation of blood. During the aforementioned eras, Muslims classified medicine as a branch of natural philosophy, influenced by the ideas of Aristotle and Galen. They were known for their specialization, including ophthalmologists and oculists, surgeons, phlebotomists, cuppers, and gynecologists.

== Overview ==
Medicine was a central part of the medieval Islamic culture. This period was called the Golden Age of Islam and lasted from the eighth century to the fourteenth century. The economic and social standing of the patient determined to a large extent the type of care sought and the expectations of the patients varied along with the approaches of the practitioners.

Responding to circumstances of time and place/location, Islamic physicians and scholars created an extensive and complex medical literature exploring, analyzing, and synthesizing the theory and practice of medicine Islamic medicine was initially built on tradition, chiefly the theoretical and practical knowledge developed in Arabia in the time of Muhammad, ancient Hellenistic medicine such as Unani, ancient Indian medicine such as Ayurveda, and the ancient Iranian Medicine of the Academy of Gundishapur. The works of ancient Greek and Roman physicians Hippocrates, Galen and Dioscorides also had a lasting impact on Middle Eastern medicine. Intellectual thirst, open-mindness, and vigor were at an all-time high in this era. During the Golden Age of Islam, classical learning was sought out, systematised and improved upon by scientists and scholars with such diligence that Arab science became the most advanced of its day. Ophthalmology has been described as the most successful branch of medicine researched at the time, with the works of Ibn al-Haytham retaining an authority in the field until early modern times.

The acceptance of new ideas and the preservation of ancient texts by Muslims in the Middle Ages helped advance medicine during that period. They added to ancient medical ideas and techniques, developed medical and related sciences, and enhanced medical knowledge in areas such as surgery and understanding the human body. Although many Western scholars do not acknowledge the Muslim influence on medicine, they believe it had no independent influence from ancient Roman and Greek medicine.

Overall, Islamic Medicine is a combination of medicines from Greece, Persia, Syria, India, and Byzantine. The literary and scientific lingua franca was adapted, changed and most important “islamicized”.The effect of it was not only spread in Islamic lands, but was also spread in Europe, Asia, China, and the Far East.

== History, origins and sources ==
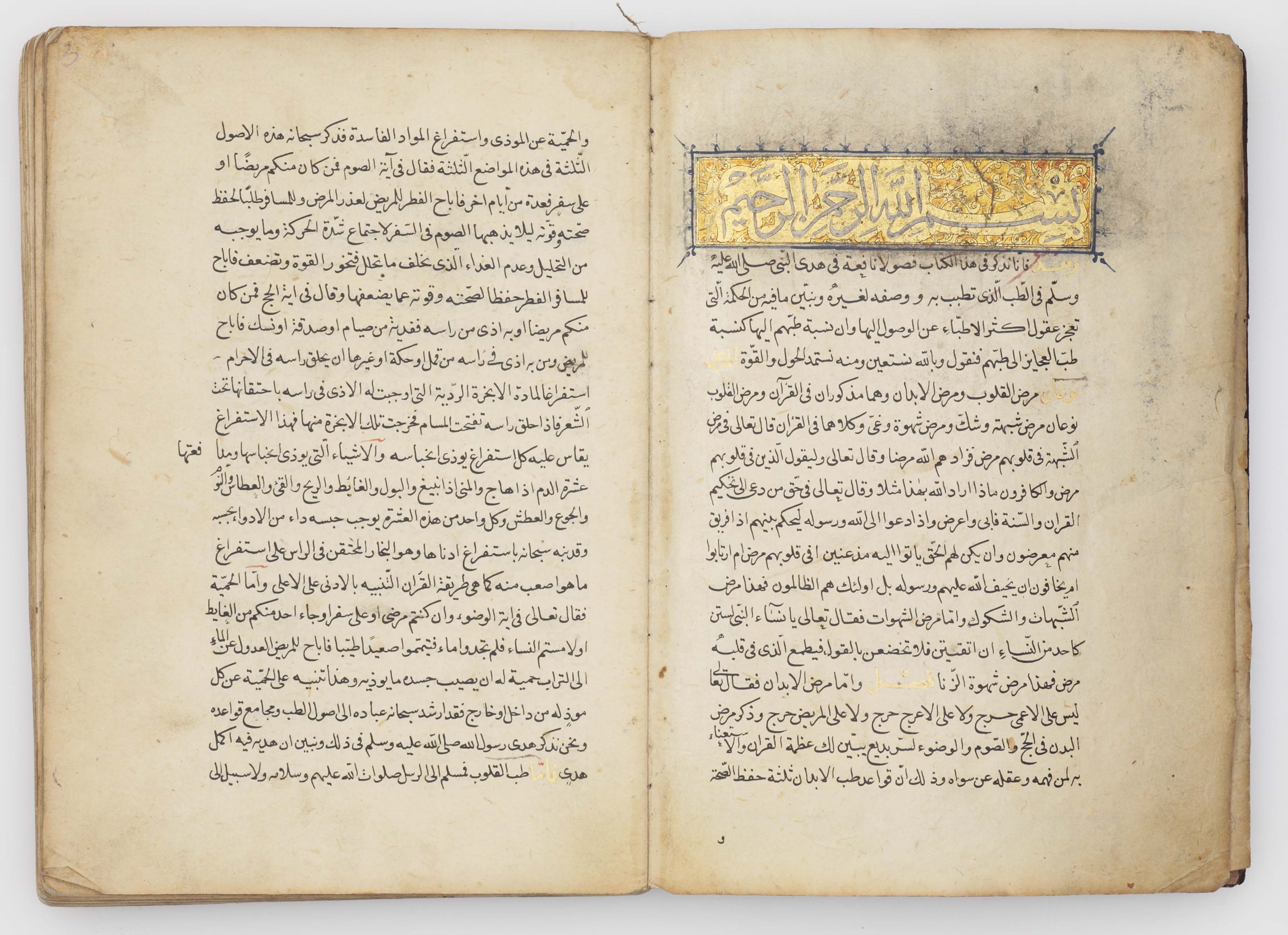
16th century manuscript of the Al-Tibb al-Nabawi (Treatise on Prophetic Medicine) created for Ottoman emperor Suleiman the Magnificent

=== Ṭibb an-Nabawī – Prophetic Medicine ===
The adoption by the newly forming Islamic society of the medical knowledge of the surrounding, or newly conquered, "heathen" civilizations had to be justified as being in accordance with the beliefs of Islam. Early on, the study and practice of medicine was understood as an act of piety, founded on the principles of īmān (faith) and tawakkul (trust in their God, Allah).

The Prophet not only instructed sick people to take medicine, but he himself invited expert physicians for this purpose.

— As-Suyuti’s Medicine of the Prophet p. 125

Muhammad's opinions on health issues and habits in regard to the leading of a healthy life were collected early on and edited as a separate corpus of writings under the title Ṭibb an-Nabī ("The Medicine of the Prophet"). In the 14th century, Ibn Khaldun, in his work Muqaddimah provides a brief overview over what he called "the art and craft of medicine", separating the science of medicine from religion:

You'll have to know that the origin of all maladies goes back to nutrition, as the Prophet – God bless him! – says with regard to the entire medical tradition, as commonly known by all physicians, even if this is contested by the religious scholars. These are his words: "The stomach is the House of Illness, and abstinence is the most important medicine. The cause of every illness is poor digestion."

— Ibn Khaldūn, Muqaddima, V, 18

Ibn Khaldun says that there was a medicine which was practiced at that time, though it is not connected to the religion. This type of medicine, which was taken from Bedouins, did not rely on science.

The Sahih al-Bukhari, a collection of prophetic traditions, or hadith by Muhammad al-Bukhari refers to a collection of Muhammad's opinions on medicine, by his younger contemporary Anas bin-Malik. Anas writes about two physicians who had treated him by cauterization and mentions that the prophet wanted to avoid this treatment and had asked for alternative treatments. Later on, there are reports of the caliph ʿUthmān ibn ʿAffān fixing his teeth with a wire made of gold. He also mentions that the habit of cleaning one's teeth with a small wooden toothpick dates back to pre-Islamic times.

The "Prophetic medicine" was rarely mentioned by the classical authors of Islamic medicine, but lived on in the materia medica for some centuries. In his Kitāb aṣ-Ṣaydalah (Book of Remedies) from the 10./11. century, Al-Biruni refers to collected poems and other works dealing with, and commenting on, the materia medica of the old Arabs.

The most famous physician was Al-Ḥariṯ ben-Kalada aṯ-Ṯaqafī, who lived at the same time as the prophet. He is supposed to have been in touch with the Academy of Gondishapur, perhaps he was even trained there. He reportedly had a conversation once with Khosrow I Anushirvan about medical topics.

=== Physicians during the early years of Islam ===
Most likely, the Arabian physicians became familiar with the Graeco-Roman and late Hellenistic medicine through direct contact with physicians who were practicing in the newly conquered regions rather than by reading the original or translated works. The translation of the capital of the emerging Islamic world to Damascus may have facilitated this contact, as Syrian medicine was part of that ancient tradition. The names of two Christian physicians are known: Ibn Aṯāl worked at the court of Muawiyah I, the founder of the Umayyad dynasty. The caliph abused his knowledge in order to get rid of some of his enemies by way of poisoning. Likewise, Abu l-Ḥakam, who was responsible for the preparation of drugs, was employed by Muawiah. His son, grandson, and great-grandson were also serving the Umayyad and Abbasid caliphate.

These sources testify to the fact that the physicians of the emerging Islamic society were familiar with the classical medical traditions already at the times of the Umayyads. The medical knowledge likely arrived from Alexandria, and was probably transferred by Syrian scholars, or translators, finding its way into the Islamic world.

=== Medicine during the Islamic Period ===
The Islamic medical tradition arose during the medieval period (c. 650–1500) and had a major impact on humans along with setting the foundation for future medicine including the current modern Western medicine. This tradition had a lasting impact in that it contributed to the European medicine along with continuing to influence medical practices today.

=== 7th–9th century: The adoption of earlier traditions ===
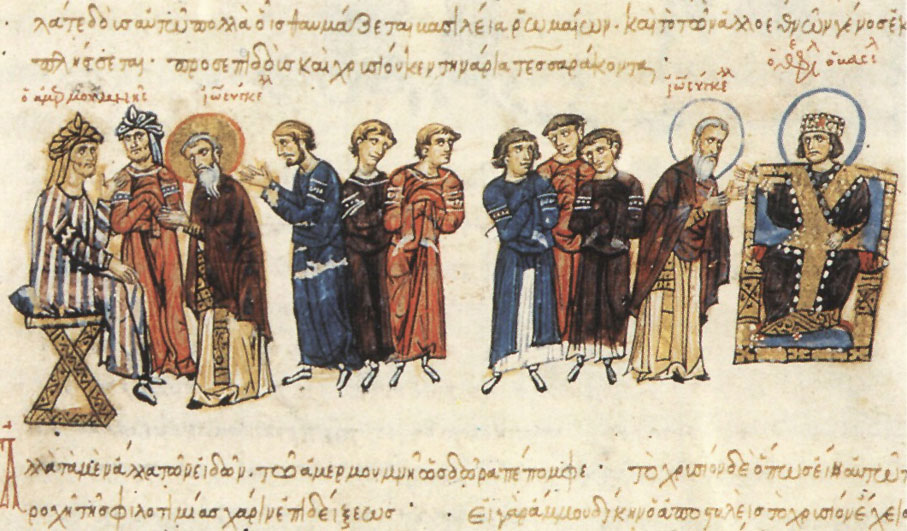
The Byzantine embassy of John the Grammarian in 829 to Al-Ma'mun (depicted left) from Theophilos (depicted right)

Very few sources provide information about how the expanding Islamic society received any medical knowledge. A physician called Abdalmalik ben Abgar al-Kinānī from Kufa in Iraq is supposed to have worked at the medical school of Alexandria before he joined ʿUmar ibn ʿAbd al-ʿAzīz's court. ʿUmar transferred the medical school from Alexandria to Antioch. It is also known that members of the Academy of Gondishapur travelled to Damascus. The Academy of Gondishapur remained active throughout the time of the Abbasid caliphate, though.

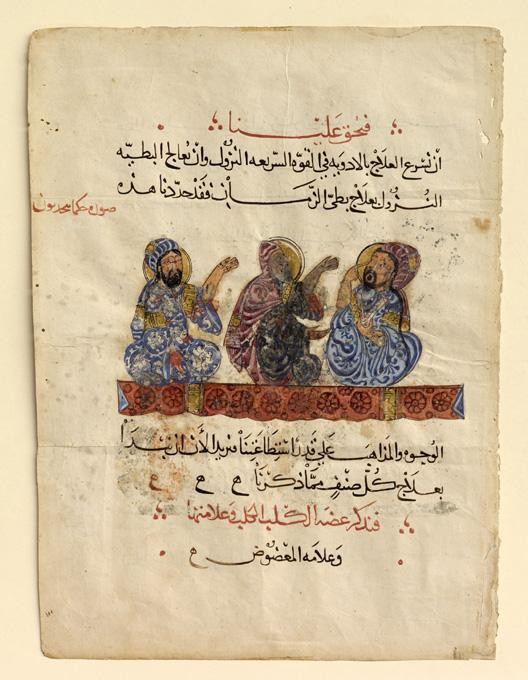
Scholars discuss medicine, from a medieval Islamic manuscript

An important source from the second half of the 8th century is Jabir ibn Hayyans "Book of Poisons". He only cites earlier works in Arabic translations, as were available to him, including Hippocrates, Plato, Galen, Pythagoras, and Aristotle, and also mentions the Persian names of some drugs and medical plants.

In 825, the Abbasid caliph Al-Ma'mun founded the House of Wisdom (Arabic: بيت الحكمة; Bayt al-Hikma) in Baghdad, modelled after the Academy of Gondishapur. Led by the Christian physician Hunayn ibn Ishaq, and with support by Byzance, all available works from the antique world were translated, including Galen, Hippocrates, Plato, Aristotle, Ptolemy and Archimedes.

It is currently understood that the early Islamic medicine was mainly informed directly from Greek sources from the Academy of Alexandria, translated into the Arabic language; the influence of the Persian medical tradition seems to be limited to the materia medica, although the Persian physicians were familiar with the Greek sources as well.

=== Ancient Greek, Roman, and late Hellenistic medical literature ===
==== Ancient Greek and Roman texts ====
Various translations of some works and compilations of ancient medical texts are known from the 7th century. Hunayn ibn Ishaq, the leader of a team of translators at the House of Wisdom in Baghdad played a key role with regard to the translation of the entire known corpus of classical medical literature. Caliph Al-Ma'mun had sent envoys to the Byzantine emperor Theophilos, asking him to provide whatever classical texts he had available. Thus, the great medical texts of Hippocrates and Galen were translated into Arabian, as well as works of Pythagoras, Akron of Agrigent, Democritus, Polybos, Diogenes of Apollonia, medical works attributed to Plato, Aristotle, Mnesitheus of Athens, Xenocrates, Pedanius Dioscorides, Kriton, Soranus of Ephesus, Archigenes, Antyllus, Rufus of Ephesus were translated from the original texts, other works including those of Erasistratos were known by their citations in Galen's works.

==== Late Hellenistic texts ====
The works of Oribasius, physician to the Roman emperor Julian, from the 4th century AD, were well known, and were frequently cited in detail by Muhammad ibn Zakariya al-Razi (Rhazes). The works of Philagrius of Epirus, who also lived in the 4th century AD, are only known today from quotations by Arabic authors. The philosopher and physician John the Grammarian, who lived in the 6th century AD was attributed the role of a commentator on the Summaria Alexandrinorum. This is a compilation of 16 books by Galen, but corrupted by superstitious ideas. The physicians Gessius of Petra and Palladios were equally known to the Arabic physicians as authors of the Summaria. Rhazes cites the Roman physician Alexander of Tralles (6th century) in order to support his criticism of Galen. The works of Aëtius of Amida were only known in later times, as they were neither cited by Rhazes nor by Ibn al-Nadim, but cited first by Al-Biruni in his "Kitab as-Saidala", and translated by Ibn al-Hammar in the 10th century.

One of the first books which were translated from Greek into Syrian, and then into Arabic during the time of the fourth Umayyad caliph Marwan I by the Jewish scholar Māsarĝawai al-Basrĩ was the medical compilation Kunnāš, by Ahron, who lived during the 6th century. Later on, Hunayn ibn Ishaq provided a better translation.

The physician Paul of Aegina lived in Alexandria during the time of the Arab expansion. His works seem to have been used as an important reference by the early Islamic physicians, and were frequently cited from Rhazes up to Avicenna. Paul of Aegina provides a direct connection between the late Hellenistic and the early Islamic medical science.

==== Arabic translations of Hippocrates ====
The early Islamic physicians were familiar with the life of Hippocrates and were aware of the fact that his biography was in part a legend. Also they knew that several persons lived who were called Hippocrates, and their works were compiled under one single name: Ibn an-Nadīm has conveyed a short treatise by Tabit ben-Qurra on al-Buqratun ("the (various persons called) Hippokrates"). Translations of some of Hippocrates's works must have existed before Hunayn ibn Ishaq started his translations, because the historian Al-Yaʾqūbī compiled a list of the works known to him in 872. Fortunately, his list also supplies a summary of the content, quotations, or even the entire text of the single works. The philosopher Al-Kindi wrote a book with the title at-Tibb al-Buqrati (The Medicine of Hippocrates), and his contemporary Hunayn ibn Ishāq then translated Galens commentary on Hippocrates. Rhazes is the first Arabic-writing physician who makes thorough use of Hippocrates's writings in order to set up his own medical system. Al-Tabari maintained that his compilation of hippocratic teachings (al-Muʾālaḡāt al-buqrāṭīya) was a more appropriate summary. The work of Hippocrates was cited and commented on during the entire period of medieval Islamic medicine.

==== Arabic translations of Galen ====
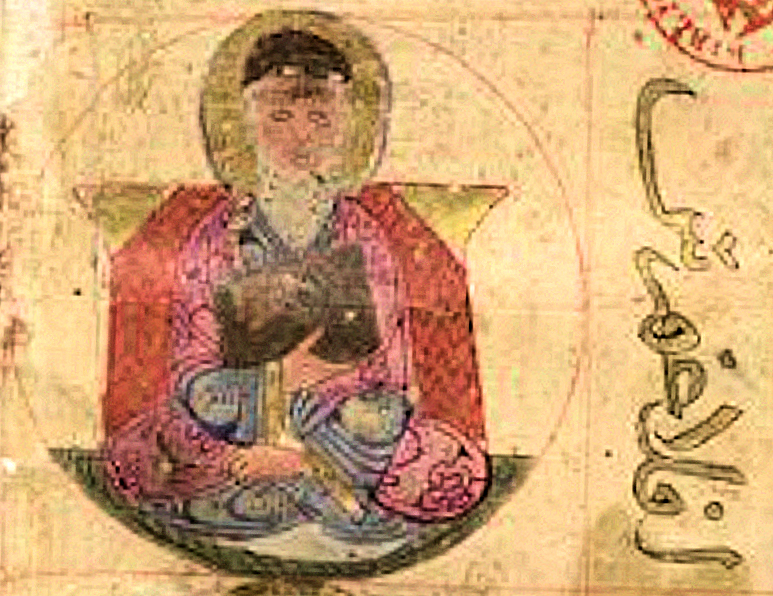
Galen (Arabic: جالينوس, romanized: Jalinus) in Kitâb al-Diryâq, 1225–1250, Syria. Vienna AF 10, Syria. Vienna AF 10

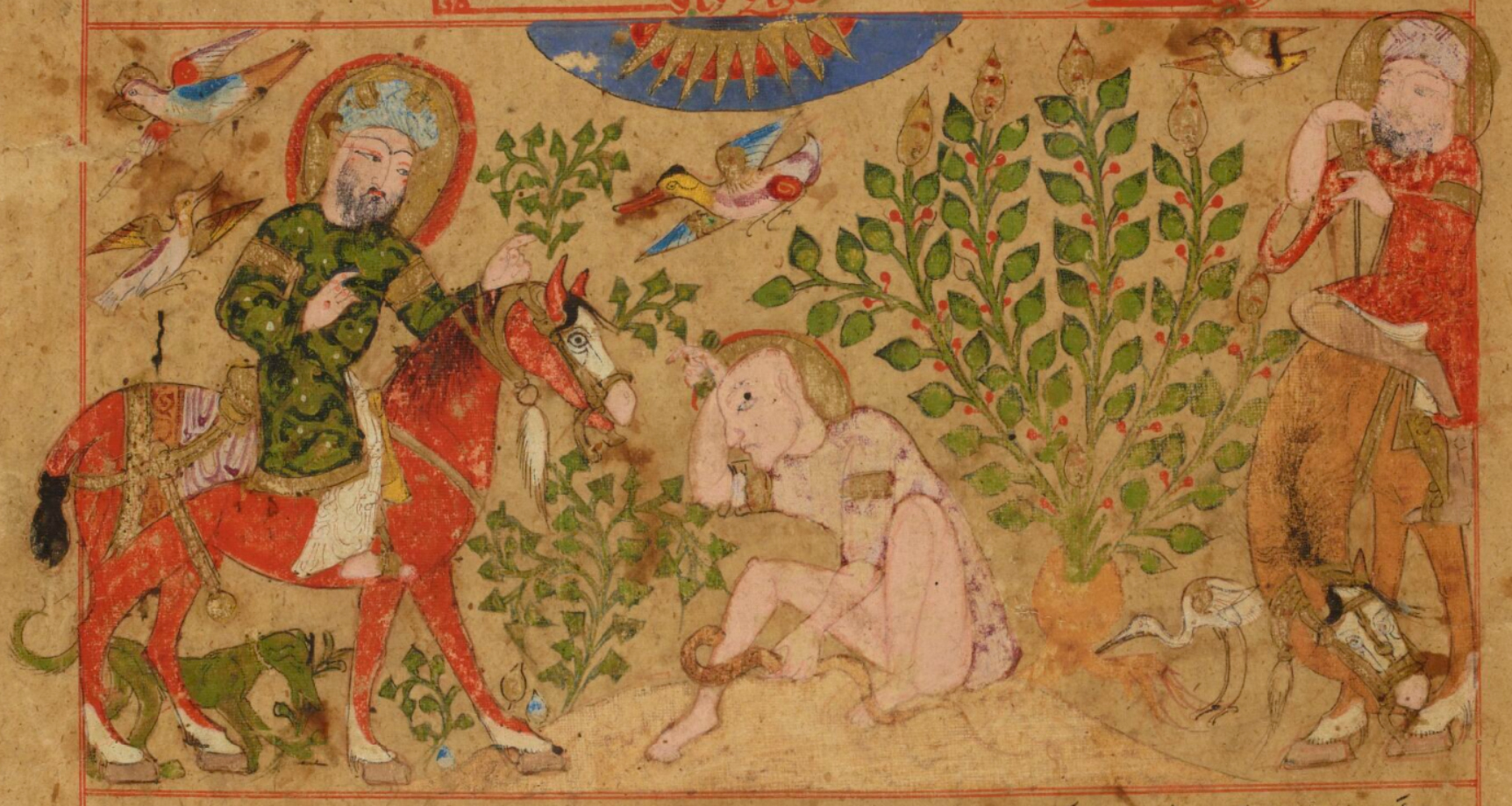
The Kitab al-Dariyak was allegedly based on the work of Galen. Here, Andromachus the Elder on horseback, questioning a patient who has received a snake bite. Kitâb al-Diryâq, 1198–1199, Syria.

Galen is one of the most famous scholars and physicians of classical antiquity. Today, the original texts of some of his works, and details of his biography, are lost, and are only known to us because they were translated into Arabic. Jabir ibn Hayyan frequently cites Galen's books, which were available in early Arabic translations. In 872 AD, Ya'qubi refers to some of Galen's works. The titles of the books he mentions differ from those chosen by Hunayn ibn Ishāq for his own translations, thus suggesting earlier translations must have existed. Hunayn frequently mentions in his comments on works which he had translated that he considered earlier translations as insufficient, and had provided completely new translations. Early translations might have been available before the 8th century; most likely they were translated from Syrian or Persian.

Within medieval Islamic medicine, Hunayn ibn Ishāq and his younger contemporary Tabit ben-Qurra play an important role as translators and commentators of Galen's work. They also tried to compile and summarize a consistent medical system from these works, and add this to the medical science of their period. However, starting already with Jabir ibn Hayyan in the 8th century, and even more pronounced in Rhazes's treatise on vision, criticism of Galen's ideas took on. in the 10th century, the physician 'Ali ibn al-'Abbas al-Majusi wrote:

With regard to the great and extraordinary Galen, he has written numerous works, each of which only comprises a section of the science. There are lengthy passages, and redundancies of thoughts and proofs, throughout his works. [...] None of them I'm able to regard [...] as being comprehensive.

— al-Majusi, 10th century

=== Syrian and Persian medical literature ===
==== Syrian texts ====
During the 10th century, Ibn Wahshiyya compiled writings by the Nabataeans, including also medical information. The Syrian scholar Sergius of Reshaina translated various works by Hippocrates and Galen, of whom parts 6–8 of a pharmacological book, and fragments of two other books have been preserved. Hunayn ibn Ishāq has translated these works into Arabic. Another work, still existing today, by an unknown Syrian author, likely has influenced the Arabic-writing physicians Al-Tabari and Yūhannā ibn Māsawaiyh.

The earliest known translation from the Syrian language is the Kunnāš of the scholar Ahron (who himself had translated it from the Greek), which was translated into the Arabian by Māsarĝawai al-Basrĩ in the 7th century. [Syriac-language, not Syrian, who were Nestorians] physicians also played an important role at the Academy of Gondishapur; their names were preserved because they worked at the court of the Abbasid caliphs.

==== Persian texts ====
Again the Academy of Gondishapur played an important role, guiding the transmission of Persian medical knowledge to the Arabic physicians. Founded, according to Gregorius Bar-Hebraeus, by the Sassanid ruler Shapur I during the 3rd century AD, the academy connected the ancient Greek and Indian medical traditions. Arabian physicians trained in Gondishapur may have established contacts with early Islamic medicine. The treatise Abdāl al-adwiya by the Christian physician Māsarĝawai (not to be confused with the translator M. al-Basrĩ) is of some importance, as the opening sentence of his work is:

These are the medications which were taught by Greek, Indian, and Persian physicians.

— Māsarĝawai, Abdāl al-adwiya

In his work Firdaus al-Hikma (The Paradise of Wisdom), Al-Tabari uses only a few Persian medical terms, especially when mentioning specific diseases, but a large number of drugs and medicinal herbs are mentioned using their Persian names, which have also entered the medical language of Islamic medicine. As well as al-Tabari, Rhazes rarely uses Persian terms, and only refers to two Persian works: Kunnāš fārisi und al-Filāha al-fārisiya.

=== Indian medical literature ===
Indian scientific works, e.g. on Astronomy were already translated by Yaʿqūb ibn Ṭāriq and Muḥammad ibn Ibrāhīm al-Fazārī during the times of the Abbasid caliph Al-Mansur. Under Harun al-Rashid, at latest, the first translations were performed of Indian works about medicine and pharmacology. In one chapter on Indian medicine, Ibn al-Nadim mentions the names of three of the translators: Mankah, Ibn Dahn, and ʾAbdallah ibn ʾAlī. Yūhannā ibn Māsawaiyh cites an Indian textbook in his treatise on ophthalmology.

al-Tabarī devotes the last 36 chapters of his Firdaus al-Hikmah to describe the Indian medicine, citing Sushruta, Charaka, and the Ashtanga Hridaya (Sanskrit: अष्टांग हृदय, aṣṭāṇga hṛdaya; "The eightfold Heart"), one of the most important books on Ayurveda, translated between 773 and 808 by Ibn-Dhan. Rhazes cites in al-Hawi and in Kitab al-Mansuri both Sushruta and Charaka besides other authors unknown to him by name, whose works he cites as "min kitab al-Hind", "an Indian book".

Meyerhof suggested that the Indian medicine, like the Persian medicine, has mainly influenced the Arabic materia medica, because there is frequent reference to Indian names of herbal medicines and drugs which were unknown to the Greek medical tradition. Whilst Syrian physicians transmitted the medical knowledge of the ancient Greeks, most likely Persian physicians, probably from the Academy of Gondishapur, were the first intermediates between the Indian and the Arabic medicine Recent studies have shown that a number Ayurvedic texts were translated into Persian in South Asia from the 14th century until the Colonial period. From the 17th century onward, many Hindu physicians learnt Persian language and wrote Persian medical texts dealing with both Indian and Muslim medical materials (Speziale 2014, 2018, 2020).

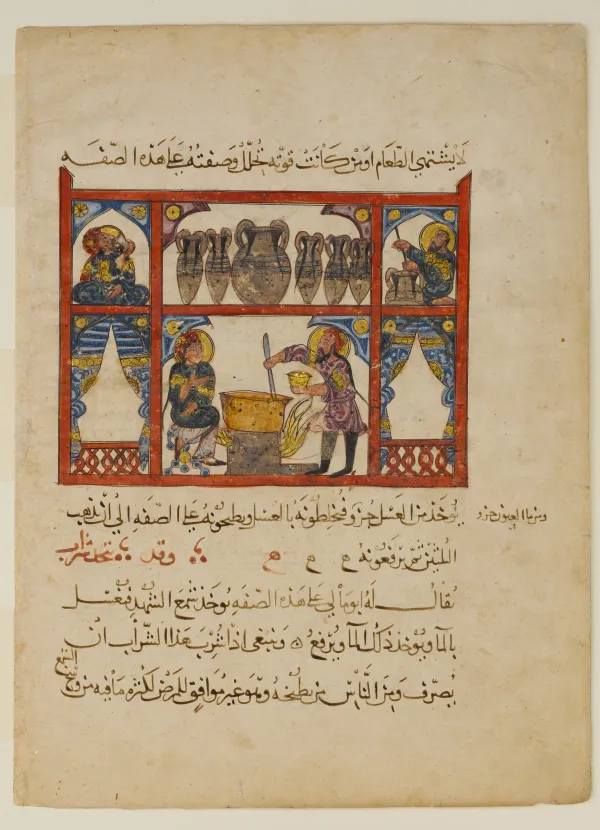
Manuscript of an Arabic Translation of De Materia Medica of DioscoridesBy' Abdullah ibn al-Fadl

== Approach to medicine ==
Medicine in the medieval Islamic world was often directly related to horticulture. Fruits and vegetables were related to health and well-being, although they were seen as having different properties than what modern medicine says now. The use of the humoral theory is also a large part of medicine in this period, shaping the diagnosis and treatments for patients. This kind of medicine was largely holistic, focused on schedule, environment, and diet. As a result, medicine was very individualistic as every person who sought medical help would receive different advice dependent not only on their ailment, but also according to their lifestyle. There was still some connection between treatments however, as medicine was largely based on humoral theory which meant that each person needed to be treated according to whether or not their humors were hot, cold, melancholic, or choleric.

=== Horticulture ===
The use of plants in medicine was quite common in this era with most plants being used in medicine being associated with both some benefits and consequences for use as well as certain situations in which they should be used.

== Physicians and scientists ==
Prominent physicians and scientists of the Islamic Golden age have influenced medicine for many centuries. Their ideas about medical ethics, the conduct of physicians and the doctor–patient relationship are still discussed today, especially in Islamic parts of the world.

=== Imam Ali ibn Musa al-Rida ===
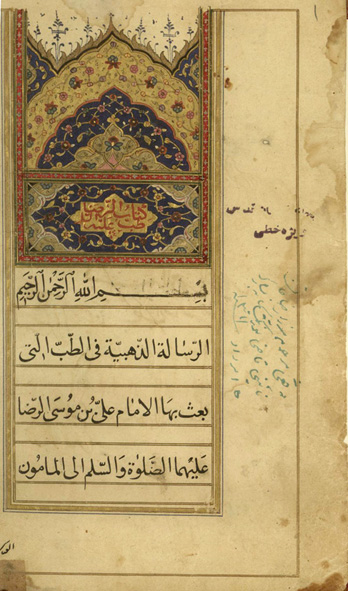
A manuscript of Al-Risalah al-Dhahabiah by Ali al-Ridha

Ali ibn Musa al-Rida (765–818) is the 8th Imam of the Shia. His treatise "Al-Risalah al-Dhahabiah" ("The Golden Treatise") deals with medical cures and the maintenance of good health, and is dedicated to the caliph Ma'mun. It was regarded at his time as an important work of literature in the science of medicine, and the most precious medical treatise from the point of view of Muslimic religious tradition. It is honoured by the title "the golden treatise" as Ma'mun had ordered it to be written in gold ink. In his work, Al-Ridha is influenced by the concept of humoral medicine

=== Ali ibn Sahl Rabban al-Tabari ===
The first encyclopedia of medicine in Arabic language was by Persian scientist Ali ibn Sahl Rabban al-Tabari's Firdous al-Hikmah ("Paradise of Wisdom"), written in seven parts, c. 860 dedicated to Caliph al-Mutawakkil. His encyclopedia was influenced by Greek sources, Hippocrates, Galen, Aristotle, and Dioscurides. Al-Tabari, a pioneer in the field of child development, emphasized strong ties between psychology and medicine, and the need for psychotherapy and counseling in the therapeutic treatment of patients. His encyclopedia also discussed the influence of Sushruta and Charaka on medicine, including psychotherapy.

=== Muhammad bin Sa'id al-Tamimi ===
Al-Tamimi, the physician (d. 990) became renown for his skills in compounding medicines, especially theriac, an antidote for poisons. His works, many of which no longer survive, are cited by later physicians. Taking what was known at the time by the classical Greek writers, Al-Tamimi expanded on their knowledge of the properties of plants and minerals, becoming avant garde in his field.

=== Ali ibn al-'Abbas al-Majusi ===
'Ali ibn al-'Abbas al-Majusi (died 994 AD), also known as Haly Abbas, was famous for the Kitab al-Maliki translated as the Complete Book of the Medical Art and later, more famously known as The Royal Book. Considered one of the great classical works of Islamic medicine, it was free of magical and astrological ideas and thought to represent Galenism of Arabic medicine in the purest form. This book was translated by Constantine and was used as a textbook of surgery in schools across Europe. The Royal Book has maintained the same level of fame as Avicenna's Canon throughout the Middle Ages and into modern time. One of the greatest contributions Haly Abbas made to medical science was his description of the capillary circulation found within the Royal Book.

=== Muhammad ibn Zakariya al-Razi ===
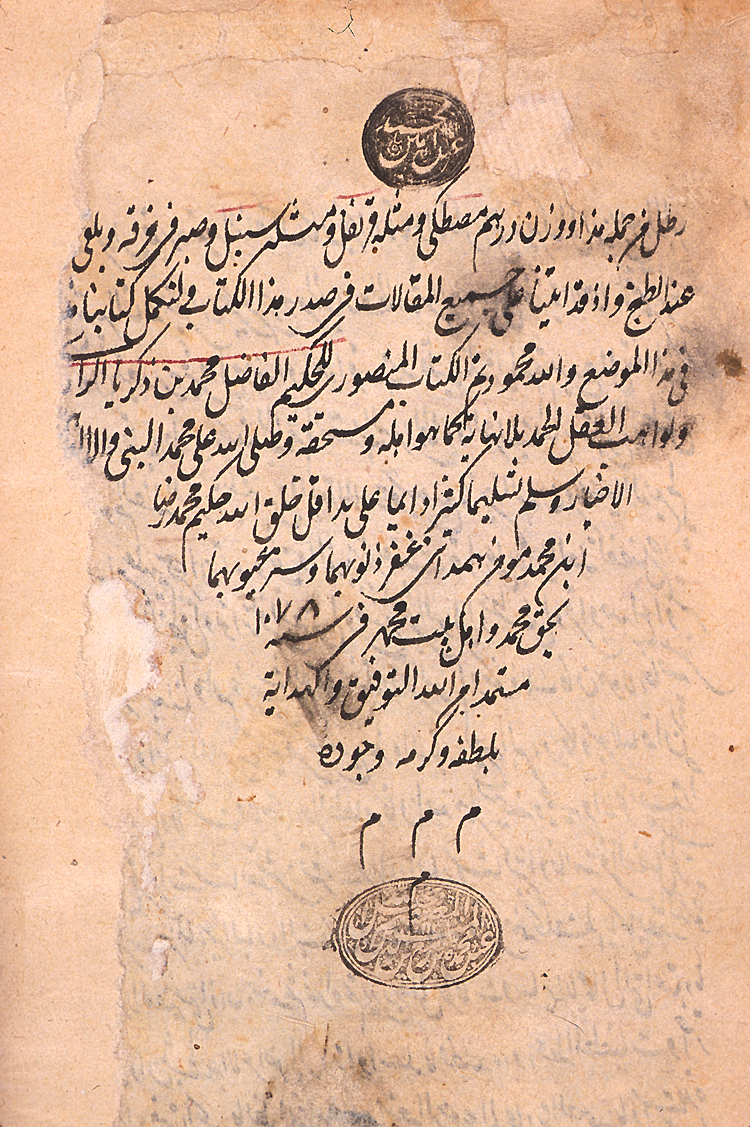
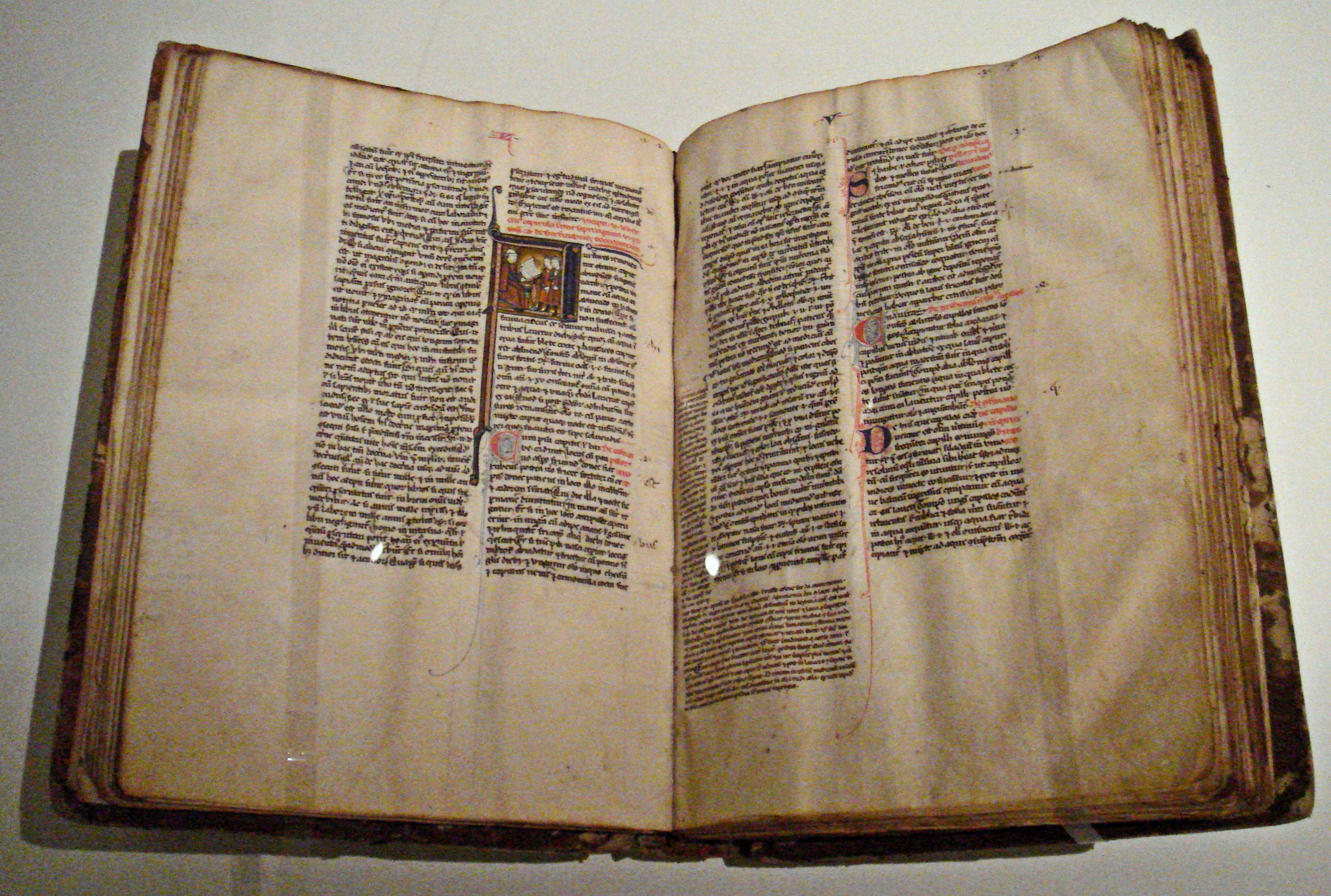
Left image: Folio from the "Liber continens" by Al-Razi
Right image: "Liber continens", translated by Gerard of Cremona, second half of the 13th century

Muhammad ibn Zakariya al-Razi (Latinized: Rhazes) (born 865) was one of the most versatile scientists of the Islamic Golden Age. A Persian-born physician, alchemist and philosopher, he is most famous for his medical works, but he also wrote botanical and zoological works, as well as books on physics and mathematics. His work was highly respected by the 10th/11th century physicians and scientists al-Biruni and al-Nadim, who recorded biographical information about al-Razi, and compiled lists of, and provided commentaries on, his writings. Many of his books were translated into Latin, and he remained one of the undisputed authorities in European medicine well into the 17th century.

In medical theory, al-Razi relied mainly on Galen, but his particular attention to the individual case, stressing that each patient must be treated individually, and his emphasis on hygiene and diet reflect the ideas and concepts of the empirical hippocratic school. Rhazes considered the influence of the climate and the season on health and well-being, he took care that there was always clean air and an appropriate temperature in the patients' rooms, and recognized the value of prevention as well as the need for a careful diagnosis and prognosis.

In the beginning of an illness, chose remedies which do not weaken the [patient's] strength. [...] Whenever a change of nutrition is sufficient, do not use medication, and whenever single drugs are sufficient, do not use composite drugs.

— Al-Razi

==== Kitab-al Hawi fi al-tibb (Liber continens) ====
The kitab-al Hawi fi al-tibb (al-Hawi الحاوي, Latinized: The Comprehensive book of medicine, Continens Liber, The Virtuous Life) was one of al-Razi's largest works, a collection of medical notes that he made throughout his life in the form of extracts from his reading and observations from his own medical experience. In its published form, it consists of 23 volumes. Al-Razi cites Greek, Syrian, Indian and earlier Arabic works, and also includes medical cases from his own experience. Each volume deals with specific parts or diseases of the body. 'Ali ibn al-'Abbas al-Majusi reviewed the al-Hawi in his own book Kamil as-sina'a:

[In al-Hawi] he refers to everything which is important for a physician to maintain health, and treat illness by means of medications and diet. He describes the signs of illness and does not omit anything which would be necessary for anyone who wants to learn the art of healing. However, he does not talk about physical topics, about the science of the elements, temperaments and humours, nor does he describe the structure of organs or the [methods of] surgery. His book is without structure and logical consequence, and does not demonstrate the scientific method. […] In his description of every illness, their causes, symptoms and treatment he describes everything which is known to all ancient and modern physicians since Hippocrates and Galen up to Hunayn ibn Ishaq and all those who lived in-between, leaving nothing out of all that every one of them has ever written, carefully noting down all of this in his book, so that finally all medical works are contained within his own book.

— al-Majusi, Kamil as-sina'a, transl. Leclerc, Vol. I, pp. 386–387

Al-Hawi remained an authoritative textbook on medicine in most European universities, regarded until the seventeenth century as the most comprehensive work ever written by a medical scientist. It was first translated into Latin in 1279 by Faraj ben Salim, a physician of Sicilian-Jewish origin employed by Charles of Anjou.

==== Kitab al-Mansuri (Liber ad Almansorem) ====
The al-Kitab al-Mansuri (الكتاب المنصوري في الطب, Latinized: Liber almansoris, Liber medicinalis ad Almansorem) was dedicated to "the Samanid prince Abu Salih al-Mansur ibn Ishaq, governor of Rayy". The book contains a comprehensive encyclopedia of medicine in ten sections. The first six sections are dedicated to medical theory, and deal with anatomy, physiology and pathology, materia medica, health issues, dietetics, and cosmetics. The remaining four parts describe surgery, toxicology, and fever. The ninth section, a detailed discussion of medical pathologies arranged by body parts, circulated in autonomous Latin translations as the Liber Nonus.

'Ali ibn al-'Abbas al-Majusi comments on the al-Mansuri in his book Kamil as-sina'a:

In his book entitled "Kitab al-Mansuri", al-Razi summarizes everything which concerns the art of medicine, and does never neglect any issue which he mentions. However, everything is much abbreviated, according to the goal he has set himself.

— al-Majusi, Kamil as-sina'a, transl. Leclerc, Vol. I, p. 386

The book was first translated into Latin in 1175 by Gerard of Cremona. Under various titles ("Liber (medicinalis) ad Almansorem"; "Almansorius"; "Liber ad Almansorem"; "Liber nonus") it was printed in Venice in 1490, 1493, and 1497. Amongst the many European commentators on the Liber nonus, Andreas Vesalius paraphrased al-Razi's work in his "Paraphrases in nonum librum Rhazae", which was first published in Louvain, 1537.

==== Kitab Tibb al-Muluki (Liber Regius) ====
Another work of al-Razi is called the Kitab Tibb al-Muluki (Regius). This book covers the treatments and cures of diseases and ailments, through dieting. It is thought to have been written for the noble class who were known for their gluttonous behavior and who frequently became ill with stomach diseases.

==== Kitab al-Jadari wa-l-hasba (De variolis et morbillis) ====
Until the discovery of Tabit ibn Qurras earlier work, al-Razi's treatise on smallpox and measles was considered the earliest monograph on these infectious diseases. His careful description of the initial symptoms and clinical course of the two diseases, as well as the treatments he suggests based on the observation of the symptoms, is considered a masterpiece of Islamic medicine.

==== Other works ====
Other works include A Dissertation on the causes of the Coryza which occurs in the spring when roses give forth their scent, a tract in which al-Razi discussed why it is that one contracts coryza or common cold by smelling roses during the spring season, and Bur’al Sa’a (Instant cure) in which he named medicines which instantly cured certain diseases.

=== Abu-Ali al-Husayn ibn Abdullah ibn-Sina (Avicenna) ===
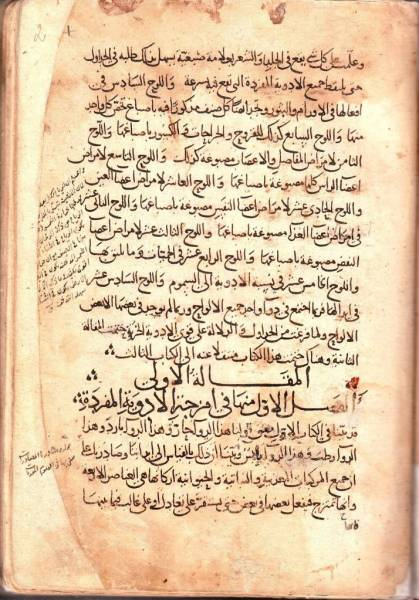
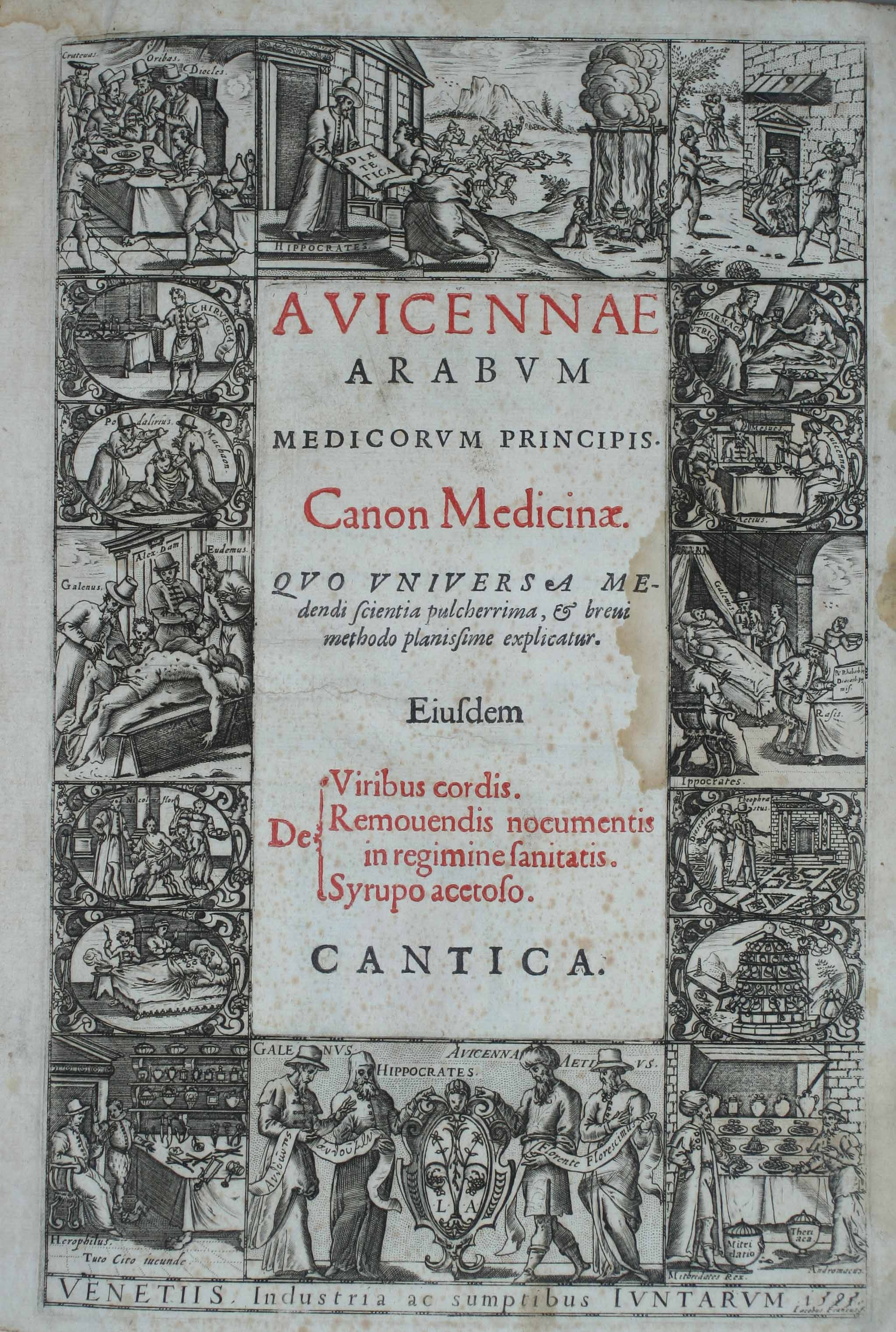
Left image: One of the oldest existing copies of The Canon of Medicine by Avicenna, c. 1030
Right image: The Canon of Medicine, printed in Venice 1595

Ibn Sina, more commonly known in west as Avicenna was a Persian polymath and physician of the tenth and eleventh centuries. He was known for his scientific works, but especially his writing on medicine. He has been described as the "Father of Early Modern Medicine". Ibn Sina is credited with many varied medical observations and discoveries such as recognizing the potential of airborne transmission of disease, providing insight into many psychiatric conditions, recommending use of forceps in deliveries complicated by fetal distress, distinguishing central from peripheral facial paralysis and describing guinea worm infection and trigeminal neuralgia. He is credited for writing two books in particular: his most famous, al-Canon fi al Tibb (The Canon of Medicine), and also The Book of Healing. His other works cover subjects including angelology, heart medicines and treatment of kidney diseases.

Avicenna's medicine became the representative of Islamic medicine mainly through the influence of his famous work al-Canon fi al Tibb (The Canon of Medicine). The book was originally used as a textbook for instructors and students of medical sciences in the medical school of Avicenna. The book is divided into five volumes: The first volume is a compendium of medical principles, the second is a reference for individual drugs, the third contains organ-specific diseases, the fourth discusses systemic illnesses as well as a section of preventive health measures, and the fifth contains descriptions of compound medicines. The Canon was highly influential in medical schools and on later medical writers.

What is more, his following quote about him being able to learn about medicine became popular among Muslim people: "Medicine is no hard and thorny science like mathematics and metaphysics, so I soon made great progress; I became an excellent physician and began to treat patients using approved remedies". Moreover, it is said that Ibn Sina authored around 450 works overall dealing with medicine, astronomy, geometry, philosophy and art. From all of the works of him 240 have survived to this day. His already mentioned books called "Al Qanun fi al Tibb" or just the "Canon" are regarded as the most powerful book ever produced by an Islamic physician. There are one million of words consisting of medical encyclopedia showing the discoveries made by Arabs with its Greek origins while being observed by Ibn Sina's personal insights. In the mentioned book, there is a documentation of the anatomy of the eye with the description of ophthalmic conditions known as "cataracts". Ibn Sina also contributed to the Islamic medicine's discoveries by describing the possible symptoms of diabetes and the way how diseases can be developed, emphasizing the disorders of one's psyche.

=== Ibn Buṭlān – Yawānīs al-Mukhtār ibn al-Ḥasan ibn ʿAbdūn al-Baghdādī (Ibn Butlan) ===
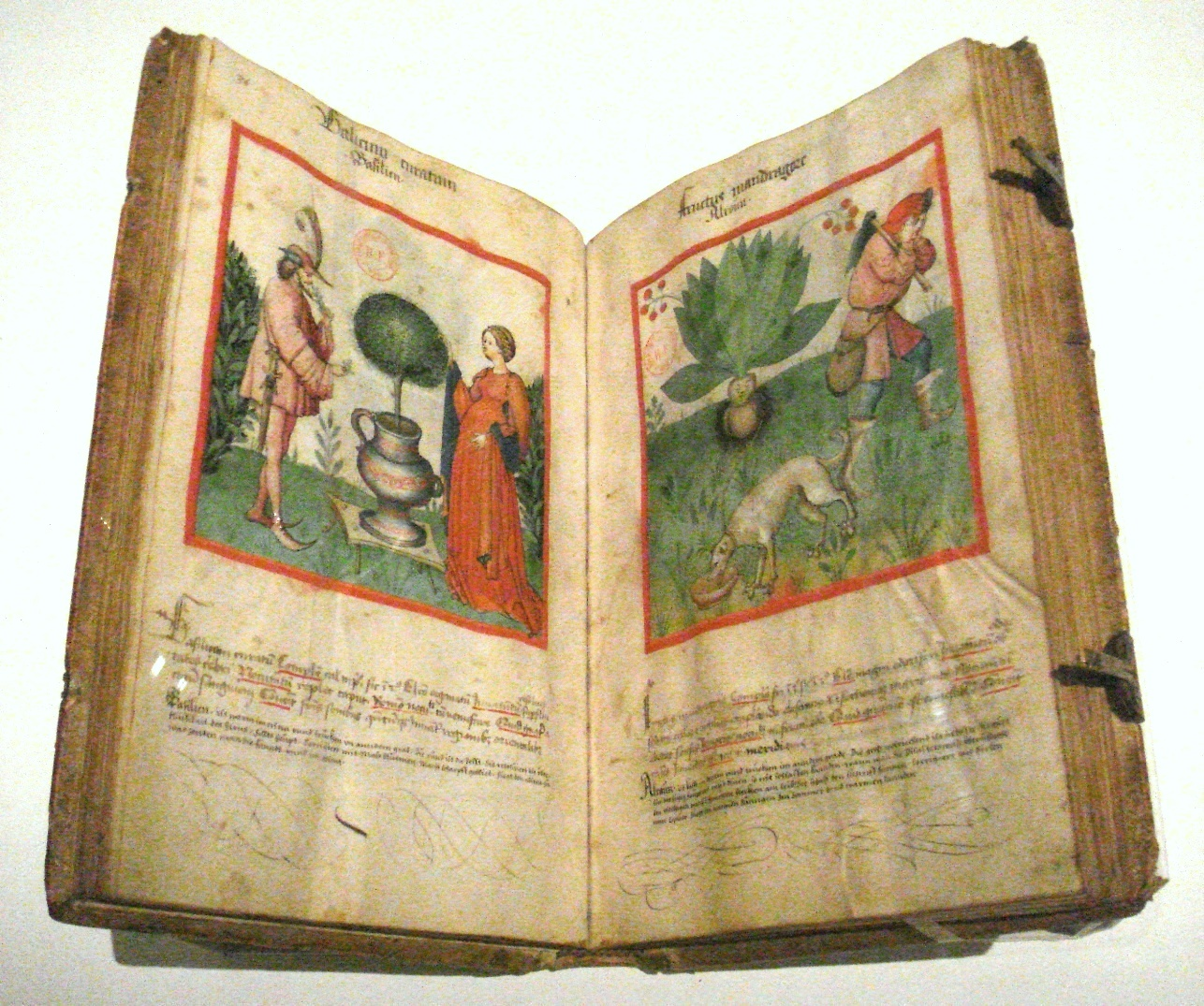
Ibn Butlan's Tacuinum sanitatis, 2nd half of 15th century, Rhineland

Ibn Buṭlān, otherwise known as Yawānīs al-Mukhtār ibn al-Ḥasan ibn ʿAbdūn al-Baghdādī, was an Arab physician who was active in Baghdad during the Islamic Golden Age. He is known as an author of the Taqwim al-Sihhah (The Maintenance of Health تقويم الصحة), in the West, best known under its Latinized translation, Tacuinum Sanitatis (sometimes Taccuinum Sanitatis).

The work treated matters of hygiene, dietetics, and exercise. It emphasized the benefits of regular attention to the personal physical and mental well-being. The continued popularity and publication of his book into the sixteenth century is thought to be demonstration of the influence that Arabic culture had on early modern Europe.

His other work include a books such as:

- Taqwim al-Sihha (تقويم الصحة)
- Da'avat al-ateba'
- Al-maqalat al-Mokhtarat fi tadbir al-amrad al-a'rezat al-aksar bel taghziat Ma'loofat
- Resalat fi shari al-raghigh va taghlib al-bai'd
- Maqalat fi an al-foroj ahar men al-farkh
- Al-maqalat al-mesriat fi monaghezat Ali Ibn Ridwan
- Maqal fi al-qorban al-moqadas (مقال في القربان المقدس)

=== Jewish physicians in the Islamic world ===
Jewish physicians in al-Andalus participated actively in the Islamic medical culture from the 10th to early 12th centuries. They studied alongside Muslim colleagues, and in some cases collaborated with Christian scholars as well. Hasdai ibn Shaprut, vizier to 'Abd al-Raḥmān III, was reported to have worked on the Arabic translation of Dioscorides' Materia Medica with a Christian monk named Nicolaus and Muslim experts. The 11th-century scholar Sā'id al-Andalusī listed several Jewish physicians in his writings, including Isḥāq ibn Qistār (d. 1056, Toledo), Menaḥem ibn al-Fawwāl, and Marwān ibn Janāḥ (Jonah ibn Janāḥ), who also authored a pharmacological treatise. Jonah ibn Biklārish, court physician to the Hūd sultan of Zaragoza, compiled a multilingual medical dictionary (Kitāb al-Musta'īnī) around 1106.

Jewish physicians were also active in Fustat, Cairo, and Kairouan. Evidence from the Cairo Genizah reveals over 2,500 medically relevant fragments, including Judeo-Arabic translations of Greek and Arabic treatises, prescriptions, pharmacological notes, and physicians' personal notebooks. Jewish doctors were trained through both textual study and apprenticeship, often under Muslim physicians and sometimes in Islamic hospitals (bīmāristān). Jews held positions at royal courts, among them Hasdai ibn Shaprut in Córdoba, Ephraim ibn al-Zafrān in Egypt, Maimonides, and Ibn Jumay', court physician to Saladin, contributing to both practice and theory. Notable original authors include Isaac Israeli, whose Arabic medical works were widely translated, and Maimonides, who wrote clinical consilia and comprehensive treatises that circulated in Arabic, Hebrew, and Latin.

Jewish physicians continued to contribute to medicine in the Mamluk Sultanate (1250–1517), both in clinical settings and medical literature. In Cairo, Abū al-Faḍl Ibn Abī al-Bayān led the Nāṣirī hospital and compiled al-Dustūr al-Bīmāristānī, a hospital handbook focused on compound medicines. His contemporary, Abū al-Munā al-Kūhin al-ʿAṭṭār, authored Minhāj al-Dukkān, a pharmacist's guide covering simples, substitutions, and preparation methods. In Syria, Nuʿmān al-Isrāʾīlī wrote a commentary on Abū Sahl al-Masīḥī's medical textbook, Kitāb al-Miʾa. Facing mounting pressures to convert, Jewish physicians like al-Sadīd al-Dimyāṭī, Faraj Allāh ibn Saghīr, and Asad al-Yahūdī held positions at court, and Jewish authors such as Solomon ibn Ya'īsh engaged in detailed commentary on Arabic medical classics like Ibn Sīnā's Canon.

== Medical contributions ==
=== Human anatomy and physiology ===
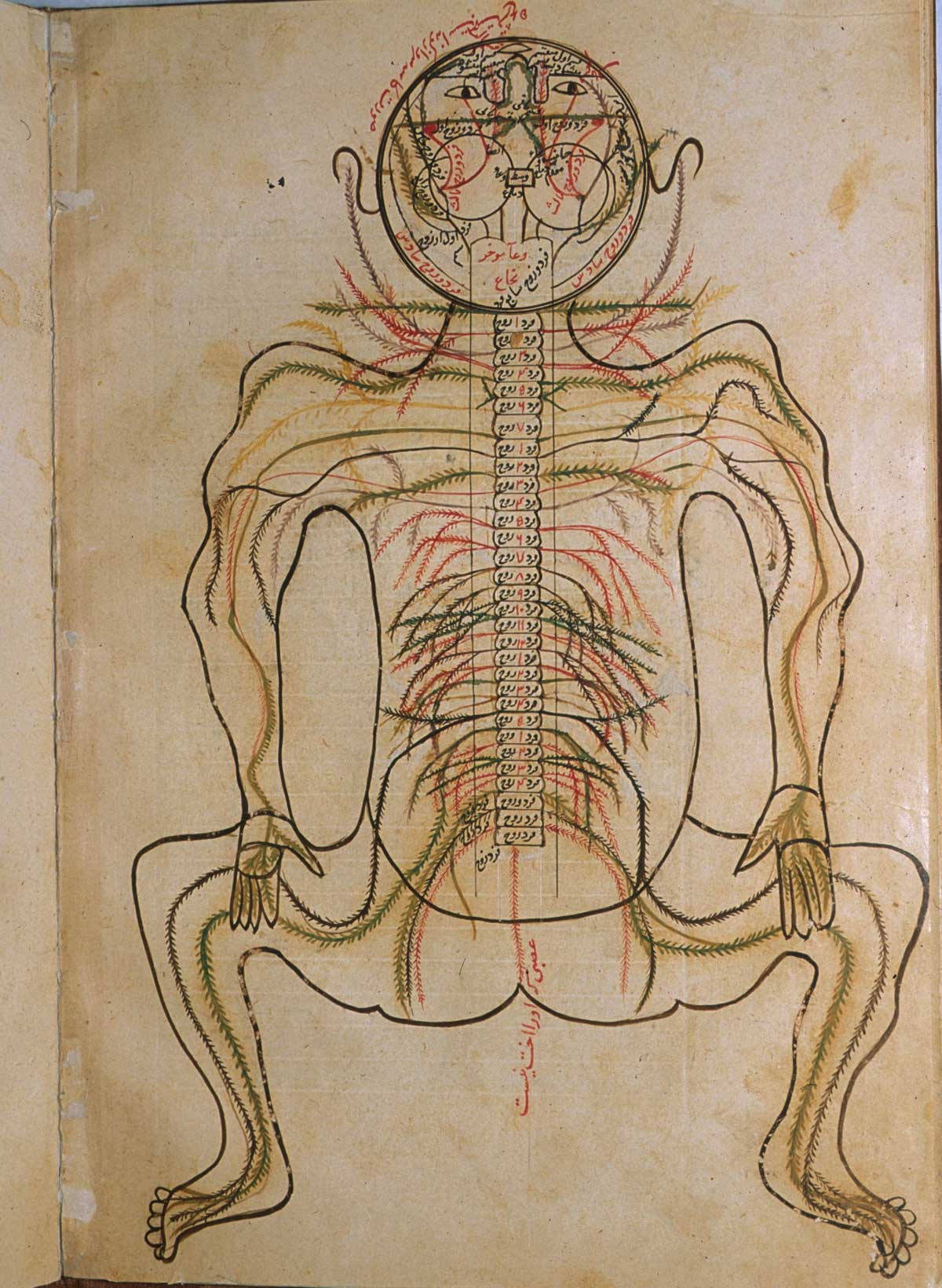
Mansur ibn Ilyas: Anatomy of the human body (تشريح بدن انسان, Tashrīḥ-i badan-i insān), c. 1450, U.S. National Library of Medicine

It is claimed that an important advance in the knowledge of human anatomy and physiology was made by Ibn al-Nafis, but whether this was discovered via human dissection is doubtful because "al-Nafis tells us that he avoided the practice of dissection because of the shari'a and his own 'compassion' for the human body".

The movement of blood through the human body was thought to be known due to the work of the Greek physicians. However, there was the question of how the blood flowed from the right ventricle of the heart to the left ventricle, before the blood is pumped to the rest of the body. According to Galen in the 2nd century, blood reached the left ventricle through invisible passages in the septum. By some means, Ibn al-Nafis, a 13th-century Syrian physician, found the previous statement on blood flow from the right ventricle to the left to be false. Ibn al-Nafis discovered that the ventricular septum was impenetrable, lacking any type of invisible passages, showing Galen's assumptions to be false. Ibn al-Nafis discovered that the blood in the right ventricle of the heart is instead carried to the left by way of the lungs. This discovery was one of the first descriptions of the pulmonary circulation, although his writings on the subject were only rediscovered in the 20th century, and it was William Harvey's later independent discovery which brought it to general attention.

According to the Ancient Greeks, vision was thought to a visual spirit emanating from the eyes that allowed an object to be perceived. The 11th century Iraqi scientist Ibn al-Haytham, also known as Al-hazen in Latin, developed a radically new concept of human vision. Ibn al-Haytham took a straightforward approach towards vision by explaining that the eye was an optical instrument. The description on the anatomy of the eye led him to form the basis for his theory of image formation, which is explained through the refraction of light rays passing between two media of different densities. Ibn al-Haytham developed this new theory on vision from experimental investigations. In the 12th century, his Book of Optics was translated into Latin and continued to be studied both in the Islamic world and in Europe until the 17th century.

Ahmad ibn Abi al-Ash'ath, a famous physician from Mosul, Iraq, described the physiology of the stomach in a live lion in his book al-Quadi wa al-muqtadi. He wrote:

When food enters the stomach, especially when it is plentiful, the stomach dilates and its layers get stretched...onlookers thought the stomach was rather small, so I proceeded to pour jug after jug in its throat…the inner layer of the distended stomach became as smooth as the external peritoneal layer. I then cut open the stomach and let the water out. The stomach shrank and I could see the pylorus…

Ahmad ibn Abi al-Ash'ath observed the physiology of the stomach in a live lion in 959. This description preceded William Beaumont by almost 900 years, making Ahmad ibn al-Ash'ath the first person to initiate experimental events in gastric physiology.

According to Galen, in his work entitled De ossibus ad tirones, the lower jaw consists of two parts, proven by the fact that it disintegrates in the middle when cooked. Abd al-Latif al-Baghdadi, while on a visit to Egypt, encountered many skeletal remains of those who had died from starvation near Cairo. He examined the skeletons and established that the mandible consists of one piece, not two as Galen had taught. He wrote in his work Al-Ifada w-al-Itibar fi al-Umar al Mushahadah w-al-Hawadith al-Muayanah bi Ard Misr, or "Book of Instruction and Admonition on the Things Seen and Events Recorded in the Land of Egypt":

All anatomists agree upon that the bone of the lower jaw consists of two parts joined together at the chin. [...] The inspection of this part of the corpses convinced me that the bone of the lower jaw is all one, with no joint nor suture. I have repeated the observation a great number of times, in over two hundred heads [...] I have been assisted by various different people, who have repeated the same examination, both in my absence and under my eyes.

— Abd al-Latif al-Baghdadi, Relation from Egypt, c. 1200 AD

Al-Baghdadi's discovery did not gain much attention from his contemporaries, because the information is rather hidden within the detailed account of the geography, botany, monuments of Egypt, as well as of the famine and its consequences. He never published his anatomical observations in a separate book, as had been his intention.

=== Modern Islamic Medicine ===
The current medical education system tends to ignore and neglect certain periods of medicine where one of which is the history of Islamic medicine. The international institute of Islamic medicine has been created to spread the history and awareness of Islamic medicine across North America. Reviving the old traditions of Islamic medicine could be very beneficial in the everyday practice.

=== Drugs ===
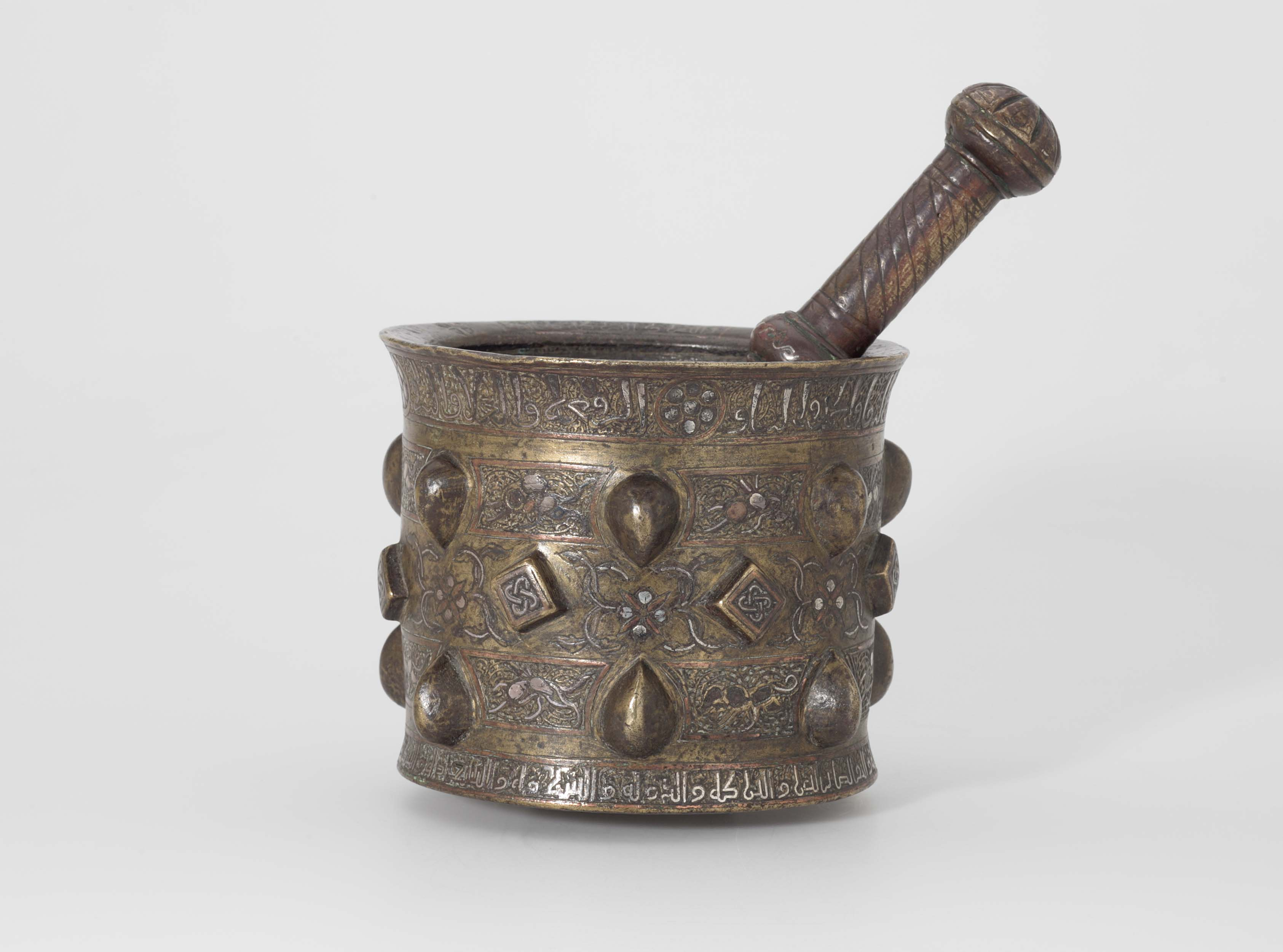
Inscribed pestle and mortar for grinding drugs. Khrusan, late 12th or early 13th century.

Medical contributions made by medieval Islam included the use of plants as a type of remedy or medicine. Medieval Islamic physicians used natural substances as a source of medicinal drugs—including Papaver somniferum Linnaeus, poppy, and Cannabis sativa Linnaeus, hemp. In pre-Islamic Arabia, neither poppy nor hemp was known. Hemp was introduced into the Islamic countries in the ninth century from India through Persia and Greek culture and medical literature. The Greek, Dioscorides, who according to the Arabs is the greatest botanist of antiquity, recommended hemp seeds to "quench geniture" and its juice for earaches. Ali al-Ruhawi believed that a physician must be a botanist and understand pharmacological characteristics of the various morphological parts. Beginning in 800 and lasting for over two centuries, poppy use was restricted to the therapeutic realm. However, the dosages often exceeded medical need and was used repeatedly despite what was originally recommended. Poppy was prescribed by Yuhanna b. Masawayh to relieve pain from attacks of gallbladder stones, for fevers, indigestion, eye, head and tooth aches, pleurisy, and to induce sleep. Although poppy had medicinal benefits, Ali al-Tabari explained that the extract of poppy leaves was lethal, and that the extracts and opium should be considered poisonous.

== Surgery ==
The development and growth of hospitals in ancient Islamic society expanded the medical practice to what is currently known as surgery. Surgical procedures were known to physicians during the medieval period because of earlier texts that included descriptions of the procedures. Translation from pre-Islamic medical publishings was a fundamental building block for physicians and surgeons in order to expand the practice. Surgery was uncommonly practiced by physicians and other medical affiliates due to a very low success rate, even though earlier records provided favorable outcomes to certain operations. There were many different types of procedures performed in ancient Islam, especially in the area of ophthalmology.

=== Techniques ===
Bloodletting and cauterization were techniques widely used in ancient Islamic society by physicians, as a therapy to treat patients. These two techniques were commonly practiced because of the wide variety of illnesses they treated. Cauterization, a procedure used to burn the skin or flesh of a wound, was performed to prevent infection and stop profuse bleeding. To perform this procedure, physicians heated a metal rod and used it to burn the flesh or skin of a wound. This would cause the blood from the wound to clot and eventually heal the wound.

Bloodletting, the surgical removal of blood, was used to cure a patient of bad "humours" considered deleterious to one's health. A phlebotomist performing bloodletting on a patient drained the blood straight from the veins. "Wet" cupping, a form of bloodletting, was performed by making a slight incision in the skin and drawing blood by applying a heated cupping glass. The heat and suction from the glass caused the blood to rise to the surface of the skin to be drained. "Dry cupping", the placement of a heated cupping glass (without an incision) on a particular area of a patient's body to relieve pain, itching, and other common ailments, was also used. Though these procedures seem relatively easy for phlebotomists to perform, there were instances where they had to pay compensation for causing injury or death to a patient because of carelessness when making an incision. Both cupping and phlebotomy were considered helpful when a patient was sickly.

=== Testing drugs ===
To evaluate the safety of the herbal drugs there are certain clinical trials and experimentation that are done so to ensure the safety of the drugs on humans. Certain methods such as in vivo and in vitro methods are some of the first steps in evaluating a drug. These processes uses animal models and they have been developed in a way that will come to mimic human conditions to see what the effects of the herbal drugs really are.

=== Treatment ===
Surgery was important in treating patients with eye complications such as trachoma and cataracts. A common complication of trachoma patients is the vascularization of the tissue that invades the cornea of the eye which was thought to be the cause of the disease by ancient Islamic physicians. The technique used to correct this complication was done surgically and known today as peritomy. This procedure was done by "employing an instrument for keeping the eye open during surgery, a number of very small hooks for lifting, and a very thin scalpel for excision." A similar technique in treating complications of trachoma, called pterygium, was used to remove the triangular-shaped part of the bulbar conjunctiva onto the cornea. This was done by lifting the growth with small hooks and then cut with a small lancet. Both of these surgical techniques were extremely painful for the patient and intricate for the physician or his assistants to perform.

In medieval Islamic literature, cataracts were thought to have been caused by a membrane or opaque fluid that rested between the lens and the pupil. The method for treating cataracts in medieval Islam (known in English as couching) was known through translations of earlier publishings on the technique. A small incision was made in the sclera with a lancet and a probe was then inserted and used to depress the lens, pushing it to one side of the eye. After the procedure was complete, the eye was then washed with salt water and then bandaged with cotton wool soaked in oil of roses and egg whites. After the operation, there was concern that the cataract, once it had been pushed to one side, would reascend, which is why patients were instructed to lie on his or her back for several days following the surgery.

=== Anaesthesia and antisepsis ===
In both modern society and medieval Islamic society, anaesthesia and antisepsis are important aspects of surgery. Before the development of anesthesia and antisepsis, surgery was limited to fractures, dislocations, traumatic injuries resulting in amputation, and urinary disorders or other common infections. Ancient Islamic physicians attempted to prevent infection when performing procedures for a sick patient, for example by washing a patient before a procedure; similarly, following a procedure, the area was often cleaned with "wine, wine mixed with oil of roses, oil of roses alone, salt water, or vinegar water", which have antiseptic properties. Various herbs and resins including frankincense, myrrh, cassia, and members of the laurel family were also used to prevent infections, although it is impossible to know exactly how effective these treatments were in the prevention of sepsis. The pain-killing uses of opium had been known since ancient times; other drugs including "henbane, hemlock, soporific black nightshade, lettuce seeds" were also used by Islamic physicians to treat pain. Some of these drugs, especially opium, were known to cause drowsiness, and some modern scholars have argued that these drugs were used to cause a person to lose consciousness before an operation, as a modern-day anesthetic would. However, there is no clear reference to such a use before the 16th century.

Islamic scholars introduced mercuric chloride to disinfect wounds.

== Medical ethics ==
Physicians like al-Razi wrote about the importance of morality in medicine, and may have presented, together with Avicenna and Ibn al-Nafis, the first concept of ethics or "practical philosophy" in Islamic medicine. Al-Razi wrote his treatise "Kitab al-tibb al-ruhani" also known as "Book on Spiritual Physick" on popular ethics. He felt that it was important not only for the physician to be an expert in his field, but also to be a role model. His ideas on medical ethics were divided into three concepts: the physician's responsibility to patients and to self, and also the patients' responsibility to physicians.

The earliest surviving Arabic work on medical ethics is Ishaq ibn 'Ali al-Ruhawi's Adab al-Tabib (Arabic: أدب الطبيب, romanized: Adab aț-Ṭabīb, "Morals of the physician" or "Practical Medical Deontology") and was based on the works of Hippocrates and Galen. Although, it should be mentioned that unlike Hippocrates, Galen did not propose a definite medical ethic code. Morals of the physician was al-Ruhawi's introductory comment to elevate the practice of medicine in order to aid the ill and enlist the help of God in his support. He quotes Hippocrates that the medical arts involve three factors: the illness, the patient, and the physician. The book consisted of twenty chapters on various topics related to medical ethics. In the first chapter of his book, al-Ruhawi declared that the truth is more important for physicians who follow rational ethics and the medical injunctions. Al-Ruhawi regarded physicians as "guardians of souls and bodies", and insisted them to use proper medical etiquette for strong medical ethics and not to ignore theoretical overtones. In pre-Islamic times, there were problems of a lack of part of an element of struggle and conflict to resolve ethical diffculites. Al-Ruhawi helped bridge this gap.

The Islamic medical ethics can be discovered as two types of topics, the Adab literature and the classic Islamic legal tradition. With Adab literature, its main course of action is to mainly promote the universal virtues and morals that exists. Its main goal is to promote the importance of ethical behaviors, good manners, and social etiquette that can then intern be applied to all human beings that exists no matter what their religious background is or even what cultural background that they derived from. Due to this Adab literature is very universal and appeals to a wide variety of religion and cultural background out there. On the other hand, with the Islamic legal traditions, it can be traced back and grounded in the Islamic laws and the jurisprudence. The Islamic legal tradition is often brought in and used when there are certain ethical dilemmas that needs to be dealt with. These can be things such as biomedical issues and the Islamic legal traditions is closely connected to the Islamic medical ethics and laws.

== Hospitals ==
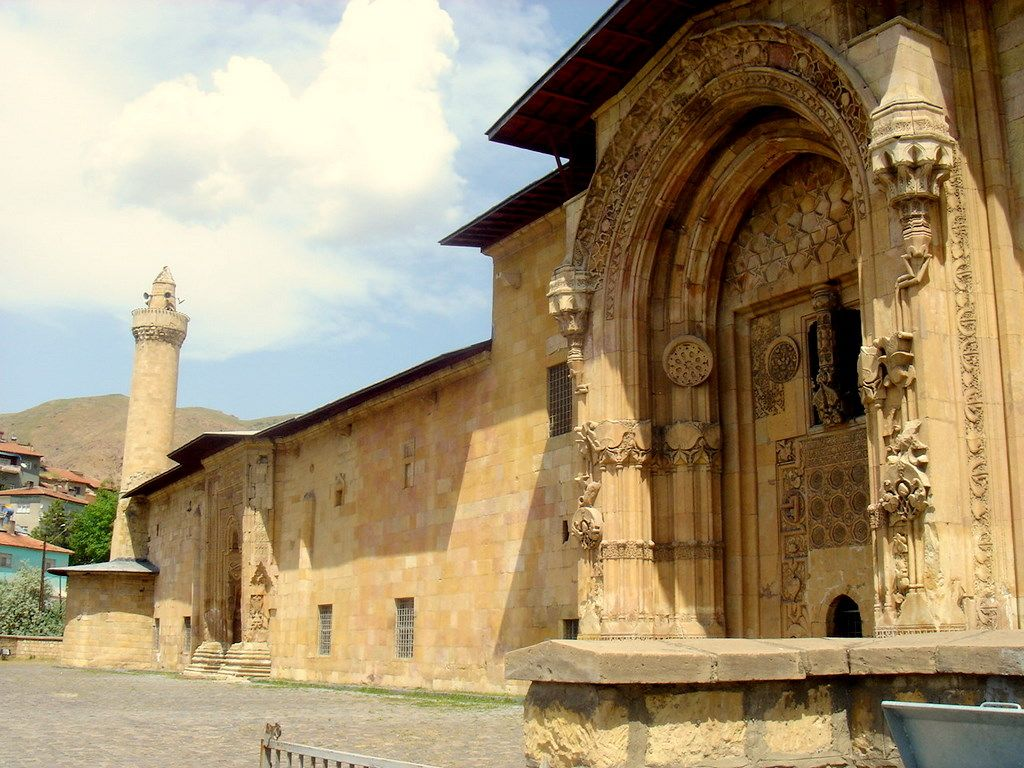
Hospital Building ("darüşşifa") of Divriği Great Mosque, Seljuq period, 13th century, Turkey

Many hospitals were developed during the early Islamic era. They were called Bimaristan, or Dar al-Shifa, the Persian and Arabic words meaning "house [or place] of the sick" and "house of curing", respectively. The idea of a hospital being a place for the care of sick people was taken from the early Caliphs. The bimaristan is seen as early as the time of Muhammad, and the Prophet's mosque in the city of Madinah held the first Muslim hospital service in its courtyard. During the Ghazwah Khandaq (the Battle of the Trench), Muhammad came across wounded soldiers and he ordered a tent be assembled to provide medical care. Over time, Caliphs and rulers expanded traveling bimaristans to include doctors and pharmacists.

Umayyad Caliph Al-Walid ibn Abd al-Malik is often credited with building the first bimaristan in Damascus in 707 AD. The bimaristan had a staff of salaried physicians and a well equipped dispensary. It treated the blind, lepers and other disabled people, and also separated those patients with leprosy from the rest of the ill. Some consider this bimaristan no more than a lepersoria because it only segregated patients with leprosy. The first true Islamic hospital was built during the reign of Caliph Harun al-Rashid (AD 786–809). The Caliph invited the son of chief physician, Jabril ibn Bukhtishu to head the new Baghdad bimaristan. It quickly achieved fame and led to the development of other hospitals in Baghdad.

=== Features of bimaristans ===
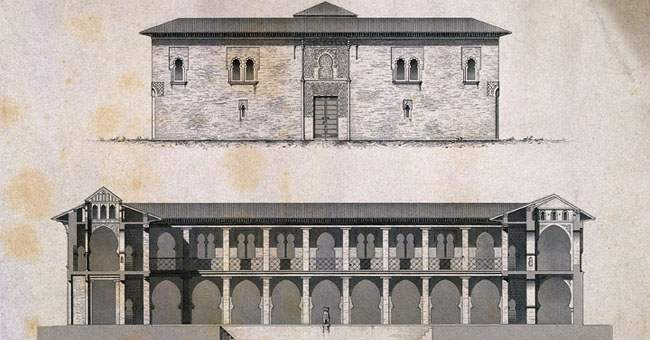
The Bimaristan of Granada

As hospitals developed during the Islamic civilization, specific characteristics were attained. Bimaristans were secular. They served all people regardless of their race, religion, citizenship, or gender. The Waqf documents stated nobody was ever to be turned away. The ultimate goal of all physicians and hospital staff was to work together to help the well-being of their patients. There was no time limit a patient could spend as an inpatient; the Waqf documents stated the hospital was required to keep all patients until they were fully recovered. Men and women were admitted to separate but equally equipped wards. The separate wards were further divided into mental disease, contagious disease, non-contagious disease, surgery, medicine, and eye disease. Patients were attended to by same sex nurses and staff. Each hospital contained a lecture hall, kitchen, pharmacy, library, mosque and occasionally a chapel for Christian patients. Recreational materials and musicians were often employed to comfort and cheer patients up.

The Bimaristan of Damascus was founded in 1154 by the Zengid ruler Nur al-Din Zengi and became one of the most renowned hospitals of the medieval Islamic world. Established as a charitable medical institution, it provided free treatment to patients regardless of background and was supported through waqf endowment. The complex was arranged around a central courtyard with a fountain, accompanied by a garden that formed part of the therapeutic environment. Historical accounts note that patients were accommodated in separate rooms according to the nature of their ailments, reflecting an organised and specialised approach to care. The bimaristan also functioned as a centre of medical teaching, preserving and advancing the clinical traditions associated with earlier authorities such as Ibn Sina and contributing to Damascus's reputation as a leading centre of medicine in the medieval Near East.

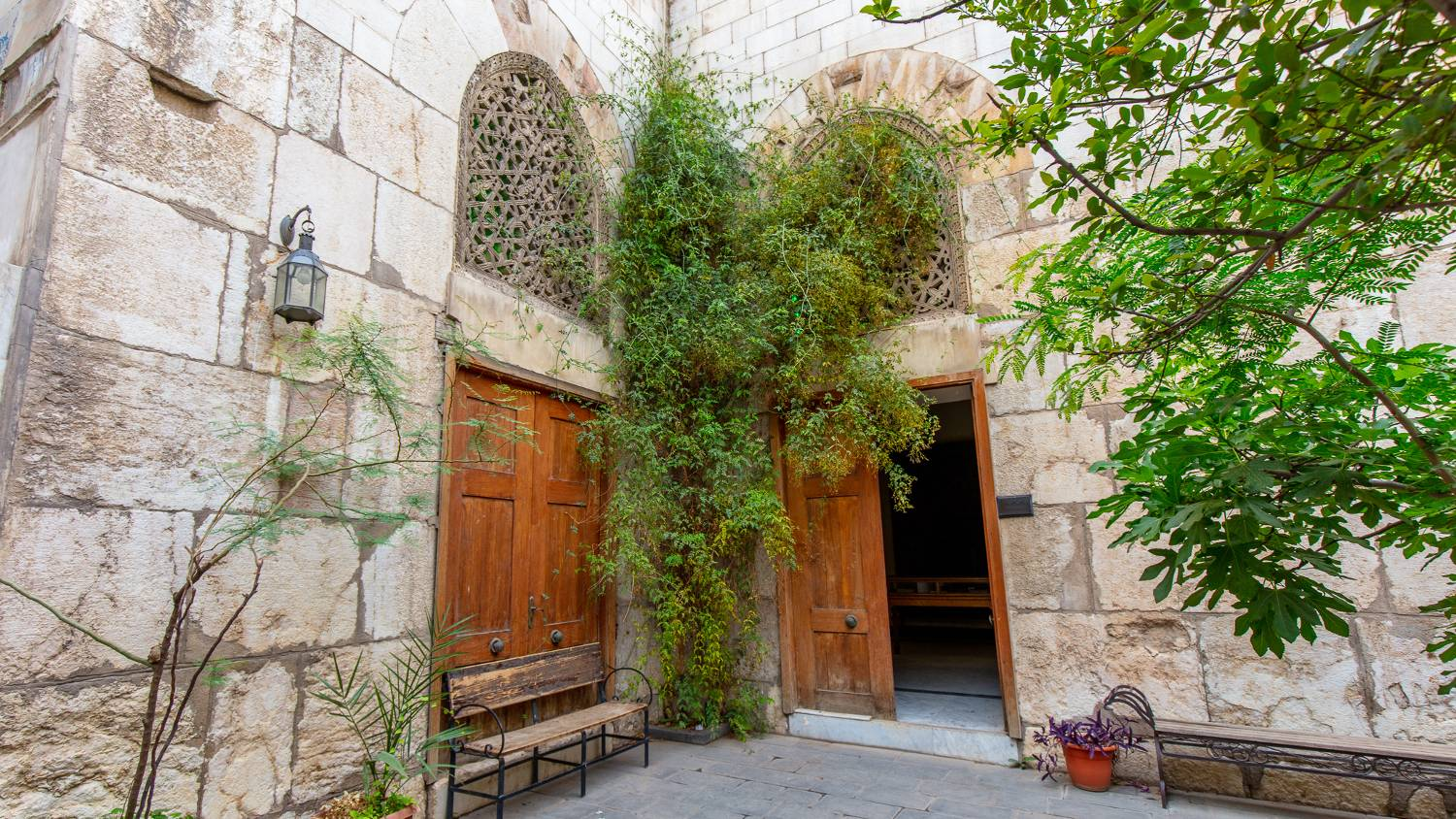
Bimaristan in Damascus

The Bimaristan of Damascus was founded in 1154 by the Zengid ruler Nur al-Din Zengi and became one of the most renowned hospitals of the medieval Islamic world. Established as a charitable medical institution, it provided free treatment to patients regardless of background and was supported through waqf endowment. The complex was arranged around a central courtyard with a fountain, accompanied by a garden that formed part of the therapeutic environment. Historical accounts note that patients were accommodated in separate rooms according to the nature of their ailments, reflecting an organised and specialised approach to care. The bimaristan also functioned as a centre of medical teaching, preserving and advancing the clinical traditions associated with earlier authorities such as Ibn Sina and contributing to Damascus's reputation as a leading centre of medicine in the medieval Near East.

The hospital was not just a place to treat patients: it also served as a medical school to educate and train students. Basic science preparation was learned through private tutors, self-study and lectures. Islamic hospitals were the first to keep written records of patients and their medical treatment. Students were responsible in keeping these patient records, which were later edited by doctors and referenced in future treatments.

During this era, physician licensure became mandatory in the Abbasid Caliphate. In 931 AD, Caliph Al-Muqtadir learned of the death of one of his subjects as a result of a physician's error. He immediately ordered his muhtasib Sinan ibn Thabit to examine and prevent doctors from practicing until they passed an examination. From this time on, licensing exams were required and only qualified physicians were allowed to practice medicine.

== Medical education ==
Medieval Islamic cultures had different avenues for teaching medicine prior to having regulated standardized institutes. Like learning in other fields at the time, many aspiring physicians learnt from family and apprenticeship until majlises, hospital training, and eventually, madrasahs became used. There are a few instances of self-education like Ibn Sīnā, but students would have generally been taught by a physician knowledgeable on theory and practice. Pupils would typically find a teacher that was related, or unrelated, which generally came at the cost of a fee. Those who were apprenticed by their relatives sometimes led to famous genealogies of physicians. The Bukhtīshū family is famous for working for the Baghdad caliphs for almost three centuries.

Before the turn of the millennium, hospitals became a popular center for medical education, where students would be trained directly under a practicing physician. Outside of the hospital, physicians would teach students in lectures, or "majlises", at mosques, palaces, or public gathering places. Al-Dakhwār became famous throughout Damascus for his majlises and was eventually oversaw all of the physicians in Egypt and Syria. He would go on to become the first to establish what would be described as a "medical school" in that its teaching focused solely on medicine, unlike other schools who mainly taught fiqh. It was opened in Damascus on 12 January 1231 and is on record to have existed at least until 1417. This followed general trends of the institutionalization of all types of education. Even with the existence of the madrasah, pupils and teachers alike often engaged in some variety of all forms of education. Students would typically study on their own, listen to teachers in majlis, work under them in hospitals, and finally study in madrasah's upon their creation. This all eventually led to the standardization and vetting process of medical education.

In 639 A.D., the Muslims had conquered and taken control of the Persian City of Jundi-Shapur. Even though the city was taken over, most of the hospitals and universities that existed were left intact to be used later on. The Islamic medical schools were later on built to the patterns that previously existed and medical education was taken very seriously regarding the cirriculum and the clinical training that has existed.

The Islamic medicine had developed the "Bimaristans" or further more known as the hospitals, they were very well developed with how efficient they were along with how advance their systems were. These hospitals served the public with no charge and no discrimination also, they were advanced with how they operated from separating males and females along with having different wards for different types of diseases.

== Pharmacy ==
The birth of pharmacy as an independent, well-defined profession was established in the early ninth century by Muslim scholars. Islamic pharmacological tradition was a result of Mesopotamian intellectual centers that supported the exchange of ideas. Indian and far east influences made their way into Mesopotamia by trade routes. Mesopotamia encompasses most of present-day Iraq, which later became the Sasanian Empire. Persians preserved Greek ideas that trickled down into Islamic pharmacology. Pharmacology in Islamic empires was characterized by all substances applied to the human body. Drugs, foods, beverages, cosmetics, and perfumes were all used for their medicinal properties. Drugs consisted of plant-derived substances that originated in various regions of Asia. Pharmacological agents were employed as treatments based on their effectiveness at maintaining the human body's equilibrium. The Greek physician Hippocrates is credited for categorizing sickness as an imbalance of the abstract qualities cold, hot, dry, and moist. A diet was proscribed as treatment for the imbalance to restore equilibrium.

Al-Biruni states that "pharmacy became independent from medicine as language and syntax are separate from composition, the knowledge of prosody from poetry, and logic from philosophy, for it [pharmacy] is an aid [to medicine] rather than a servant". Sabur Ibn Sahl was a physician (d. 869) who wrote the first text on pharmacy in his book Aqrabadhin al-Kabir. Heavily influenced by Dioscorides, it is believed that his book was written after Dioscorides' Materia Medica. The acclaimed Greek herbalist Dioscorides worked alongside Greek physician Galen to categorize pharmacological agents. The Andalusian physician Ibn Juljul systematized substances from India, Southeast Asia, or Indian Ocean lands. The categorizing of substances was further organized based on their transmission into the Islamicate empire. The origins consisted of Greek, Indian, or Iranian origination. The knowledge of the substances' medicinal properties were result of pre-Islamic Sasanian empire and the pyro-Persian culture that emphasized pharmacological pursuits. Islamicate pharmacy achieved the implementation of a systematic method of identifying substances based on their medicinal attributes. In addition, Sabur also wrote three other books A Refutation of Hunayn's Book on the Difference Between Diet and the Laxative Medicine; A Treatise on Sleep and Wakefulness; and Substitution of one Drug for Another. Although his works was not enforced by the government authorities, they were widely accepted in the medical circles. The branch of pharmacology was a result of continuity and expansion of pre-existing civilizations.

== Women and medicine ==
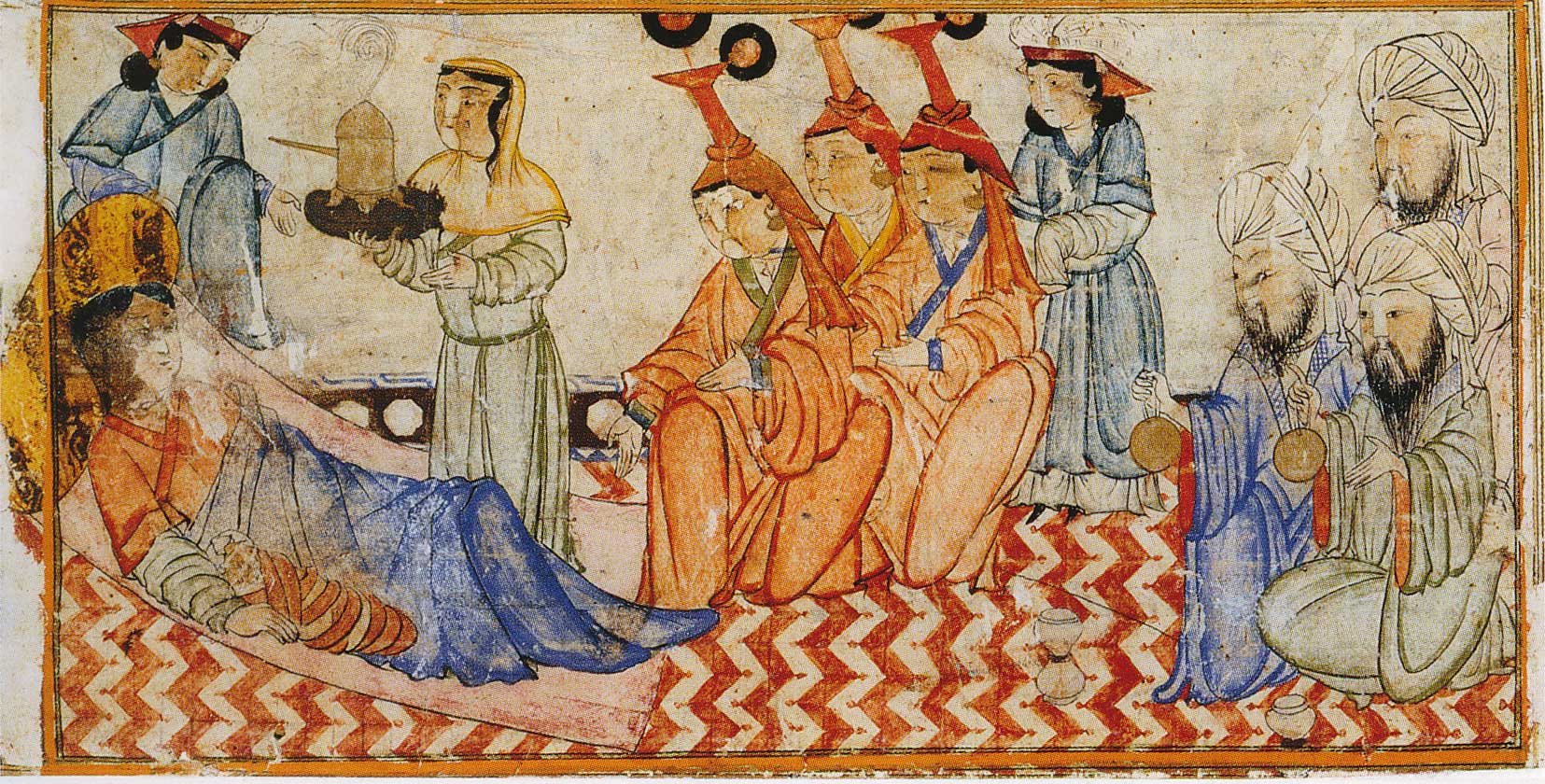
Birth of a prince. Illustration of Rashid-ad-Din's Jami' al-tawarikh. 14th century. The astrologers have astrolabes.

During the medieval time period Hippocratic treatises became used widespread by medieval physicians, due to the treatises practical form as well as their accessibility for medieval practicing physicians. Hippocratic treatises of Gynecology and Obstetrics were commonly referred to by Muslim clinicians when discussing female diseases. The Hippocratic authors associated women's general and reproductive health and organs and functions that were believed to have no counterparts in the male body.

=== Beliefs ===
The Hippocratics blamed the womb for many of the women's health problems, such as schizophrenia. They described the womb as an independent creature inside the female body; and, when the womb was not fixed in place by pregnancy, the womb which craves moisture, was believed to move to moist body organs such as the liver, heart, and brain. The movement of the womb was assumed to cause many health conditions, most particularly that of menstruation was also considered essential for maintaining women's general health.

Many beliefs regarding women's bodies and their health in the Islamic context can be found in the religious literature known as "medicine of the prophet". These texts suggested that men stay away from women during their menstrual periods, "for this blood is corrupt blood", and could actually harm those who come in contact with it. Much advice was given with respect to the proper diet to encourage female health and in particular fertility. For example: quince makes a woman's heart tender and better; incense will result in the woman giving birth to a male; the consumption of water melons while pregnant will increase the chance the child is of good character and countenance; dates should be eaten both before childbirth to encourage the bearing of sons and afterwards to aid the woman's recovery; parsley and the fruit of the palm tree stimulates sexual intercourse; asparagus eases the pain of labor; and eating the udder of an animal increases lactation in women. In addition to being viewed as a religiously significant activity, sexual activity was considered healthy in moderation for both men and women. However, the pain and medical risk associated with childbirth was so respected that women who died while giving birth could be viewed as martyrs. The use of prayers and invocations to God were also a part of religious belief surrounding women's health, the most notable being Muhammad's encounter with a slave-girl whose scabbed body he saw as evidence of her possession by the Evil Eye. He recommended that the girl and others possessed by the Eye use a specific invocation to God in order to rid themselves of its debilitating effects on their spiritual and physical health.

==== Sexual intercourse and conception ====
The lack of a menstrual cycle in women was viewed as menstrual blood being "stuck" inside the woman and the method for release of this menstrual blood was for the woman to seek marriage or sexual intercourse with a male. Among both healthy and sick women, it was generally believed that sexual intercourse and giving birth to children were means of keeping women from getting sick. One of the conditions that lack of sexual intercourse was considered to lead to is uterine suffocation in which it was believed there was movement of the womb inside the woman's body and the cause of this movement was attributed to be from the womb's desire for semen.

There was consensus among Arabic medical scholars that an excess of heat, cold, dryness or moisture in the woman's uterus would lead to the death of the fetus. The Hippocratics believed more warmth in the woman leads to the woman having a "better" color and leads to the production of a male offspring while more coldness in the woman leads to her having an "uglier" color, leading to her producing a female offspring. Al-Razi is critical of this point of view, stating that it is possible for a woman to be cold when she becomes pregnant with a female fetus, then for that woman to improve her condition and become warm again, leading to the woman possessing warmth but still having a female fetus. Al-Razi concludes that masculinity and femininity are not dependent on warmth as many of his fellow scholars have proclaimed, but instead dependent on the availability of one type of seed.

==== Infertility ====
Infertility was viewed as an illness, one that could be cured if the proper steps were taken. Unlike the easement of pain, infertility was not an issue that relied on the patient's subjective feeling. A successful treatment for infertility could be observed with the delivery of a child. Therefore, this allowed the failures of unsuccessful methods for infertility treatment to be explained objectively by Arab medical experts.

The treatment for infertility by Arab medical experts often depends on the type of conception theory they follow. The two-seed theory states that female sexual pleasure needs to be maximized in order to ensure the secretion of more seeds and thus maximize the chances of conception. Ibn Sina recommends that men need to try to enlarge their penises or to narrow the woman's vagina in order to increase the woman's sexual pleasure and thus increase the chance of producing an offspring. Another theory of conception, the "seed and soil" model, states that the sperm is the only gamete and the role of the woman's body is purely for nourishment of the embryo. Treatments used by followers of this method often include treating infertile women with substances that are similar to fertilizer. One example of such a treatment is the insertion of fig juice into the womb. The recipe for fig juice includes substances that have been used as agricultural fertilizer.

==== Miscarriage ====
Al-Tabari, inspired by Hippocrates, believes that miscarriage can be caused by physical or psychological experiences that causes a woman to behave in a way that causes the bumping of the embryo, sometimes leading to its death depending on what stage of pregnancy the woman is currently in. He believed that during the beginning stages of pregnancy, the fetus can be ejected very easily and is akin to an "unripe fruit". In later stages of pregnancy, the fetus is more similar to a "ripe fruit" where it is not easily ejected by simple environmental factors such as wind. Some of the physical and psychological factors that can lead a woman to miscarry are damage to the breast, severe shock, exhaustion, and diarrhea.

==== Contraception ====
While the belief that carrying children and childbirth was very important and healing part of the Islamic culture, many medical scholars also recognize the importance of family planning, primarily through contraceptives and abortion. The use of contraceptives and abortion as opposed to abstinence was preferred due to the belief in the tremendous healing properties brought by sexual intercourse. The topic of contraceptives and abortion had been very controversial throughout the western world; however, in the Islamic culture, due to the ties between women's reproductive health and one's overall well-being, medieval Muslim physicians devoted time and research into recording and testing different theories in this field.

Prior to the development and research into safe contraceptives in order to prevent pregnancy, the concept of 'induced miscarriages' grew popular. This was the act of intentionally causing a miscarriage in the very early stages of pregnancy, though medical journals outlined a variety of methods, this was usually achieved through the consumption of plant derived substances. Medical journals and other literature from this time show an extensive and detailed list of a variety of different drugs and plant derived substances that supposedly have abortifacient qualities. Many of these substances were later laboratory tested and found to be correctly identified in their ability to induce a miscarriage. While some of these early texts did recommend a woman get an abortion during early stages, it was clear that it was a dangerous and potentially fatal procedure for the mother, causing a greater reliance on the safer alternative techniques and substances these texts also provided. Further development in this field led to the introduction of contraceptives that would prevent one's need to induce a miscarriage. Many religious scholars and medieval physicians of the time agreed on the importance of contraceptive alternatives due to the legal rights of women. This was due to the belief that "early withdrawal impinged upon [the woman's] rights ... to enjoy full satisfaction." Commencing more research into possible contraceptives. The data from this research made its way into the previously mentioned medical journals, already containing a list of abortifacients, providing a great variety of drugs and other prescribed substances for use as a contraceptive. The lists of drugs and other substances in these journals became widely accessible to be utilized by the public.

The great availability and accessibility of these medical texts and the depth of research shown by the data shows that contraceptives and abortions, surgical or not, were frequently sought after by women of this time. While there may be a variety of reasons women would require these resources, whether connected to population control or personal reasons, it is clear that the Islamic culture not only incorporated, but brought about positive connotations in regards to women's reproductive health. During a period in which men dominated medicine, the almost immediate inclusion of women's reproductive health in medical texts, along with a variety of different techniques and contraceptive substances, long before the development of 'the pill', reinforces the cultural belief that men and women were to be viewed as equals, in regards to sexual health.

=== Roles ===
There are examples male guardians consenting to the treatment of women by male physicians as well as examples of women seeking the care of a male physician or surgeon independently. Women would also seek the care of other women, and the role of women as practitioners appears in a number of works despite the male dominance within the medical field. Two female physicians from Ibn Zuhr's family served the Almohad ruler Abu Yusuf Ya'qub al-Mansur in the 12th century. Later in the 15th century, female surgeons were illustrated for the first time in Şerafeddin Sabuncuoğlu's Cerrahiyyetu'l-Haniyye (Imperial Surgery). Treatment provided to women by men was justified to some by prophetic medicine (al-tibba alnabawi), otherwise known as "medicine of the prophet" (tibb al-nabi), which provided the argument that men can treat women, and women men, even if this means they must expose the patient's genitals in necessary circumstances.

Female doctors, midwives, and wet nurses have all been mentioned in literature of the time period.

== Role of Christians ==
A hospital and medical training center existed at Gundeshapur. The city of Gundeshapur was founded in 271 by the Sassanid king Shapur I. It was one of the major cities in Khuzestan province of the Persian empire in what is today Iran. A large percentage of the population were Syriacs, most of whom were Christians. Under the rule of Khosrau I, refuge was granted to Greek Nestorian Christian philosophers including the scholars of the Persian School of Edessa (Urfa) (also called the Academy of Athens), a Christian theological and medical university. These scholars made their way to Gundeshapur in 529 following the closing of the academy by Emperor Justinian. They were engaged in medical sciences and initiated the first translation projects of medical texts. The arrival of these medical practitioners from Edessa marks the beginning of the hospital and medical center at Gundeshapur. It included a medical school and hospital (bimaristan), a pharmacology laboratory, a translation house, a library and an observatory. Indian doctors also contributed to the school at Gundeshapur, most notably the medical researcher Mankah. Later after Islamic invasion, the writings of Mankah and of the Indian doctor Sustura were translated into Arabic at Baghdad. Daud al-Antaki was one of the last generation of influential Arab Christian writers.

The cooperation that occurred during the Abbasid empire in 750 A.D rested on the engagement between Nestorian Christians from the Byzantine empire and the Abbasid ruling elite. Nestorian Christians from the Byzantine empire escaped persecution and opposition to scientific advancements to receive financial support from the ruling elite of the Byzantine empire. The Greek texts of Galen were introduced by Christians and translated into Arabic for Islamic scholars and physicians to make commentaries. With the emerging combined civilizations, the caliphs of the Abbasid empire were eager to gain knowledge from the pre-existing societies. The Byzantine empire depicted a modernized society that engaged in medical and pharmacological pursuits. The less oppressive Islamic view of Greek secular knowledge promoted the cooperation between Nestorian Christians and the Islamic empire. The Abbasid caliph al-Ma’mun was credited for promoting the translation of Greek texts, which accelerated the solidification of medicine in the Islamicate empires. The cooperation from the Nestorian Christians was enabled by the lack of conflict associated with the subject of medicine. Christians and Muslims were able to collaborate without religious conflicts arising. Greek and Syriac texts were translated into Arabic as the Hellenic period of scientific pursuit transitioned into the Islamic empire. One of the most acclaimed translators of the Islamicate empires was a Nestorian Christian, Hunnayn b. Ishaq, who was well versed in Syriac, Greek, Arabic, and medical training. Hunnayn's translations were mainly works of the Greek physician Galen. Ultimately, Hunnayn is credited for establishing a successful systematic method of translation for scientific texts.

== Legacy ==
Medieval Islam's receptiveness to new ideas and heritages helped it make major advances in medicine during this time, adding to earlier medical ideas and techniques, expanding the development of the health sciences and corresponding institutions, and advancing medical knowledge in areas such as surgery and understanding of the human body, although many Western scholars have not fully acknowledged its influence (independent of Roman and Greek influence) on the development of medicine.

Through the establishment and development of hospitals, ancient Islamic physicians were able to provide more intrinsic operations to cure patients, such as in the area of ophthalmology. This allowed for medical practices to be expanded and developed for future reference.

The contributions of the two major Muslim philosophers and physicians, Al-Razi and Ibn Sina, provided a lasting impact on Muslim medicine. Through their compilation of knowledge into medical books they each had a major influence on the education and filtration of medical knowledge in Islamic culture.

Additionally there were some iconic contributions made by women during this time, such as the documentation: of female doctors, physicians, surgeons, wet nurses, and midwives.

== See also ==
- Al-Tasrif
- Anatomy Charts of the Arabs
- Science in the medieval Islamic world
- De Gradibus
- Medical Encyclopedia of Islam and Iran
- Challenge of the Quran
- Commission on Scientific Signs in the Quran and Sunnah
- I'jaz
- Ibn Sina Academy of Medieval Medicine and Sciences
- Inventions in the Islamic world
- Iranian traditional medicine
- Islamic attitudes towards science
- Islamic bioethics
- Islamic views on evolution
- Islamic view of miracles
- Maimonides (Moshe ben Maimon)
- Miracles of Muhammad
- Muhammad ibn Zakariya al-Razi
- Prophetic medicine
- Quran and miracles
- Unani
