= Persian medicine =

Persian medicine may refer to:

- Iranian traditional medicine (traditional Persian medicine)
- Ancient Iranian medicine: premodern history of medicine in Persia
- Healthcare in Iran: medical care in modern Iran
