= Anatomy Charts of the Arabs =

The Anatomy Charts of the Arabs are a collection of drawings described by Karl Sudhoff on 1908. Four charts (the skeleton, the muscles, the blood vessels, the organs) are found in a 264-folio illustrated manuscript, N° “500-510/...Ah/1110/n14” in The Sami I Haddad Memorial Library - Rancho Palos Verdes Branch and N° “90” in the Catalogue of the Arabic medical manuscripts in the Library of Dr. Sami Ibrahim Haddad written by Farid Haddad and HH Biesterfeld (Aleppo 1984). Parts of the texts were written in Arabic and other sections in Persian. The scribe was either faJraldÿn mahAbAdÿ or muHammad Cÿrÿn; both are unknown physicians mentioned in the text. The copy was made in Patna, Bihar, India sometime between 944 and 1110 AH.

== Gallery ==
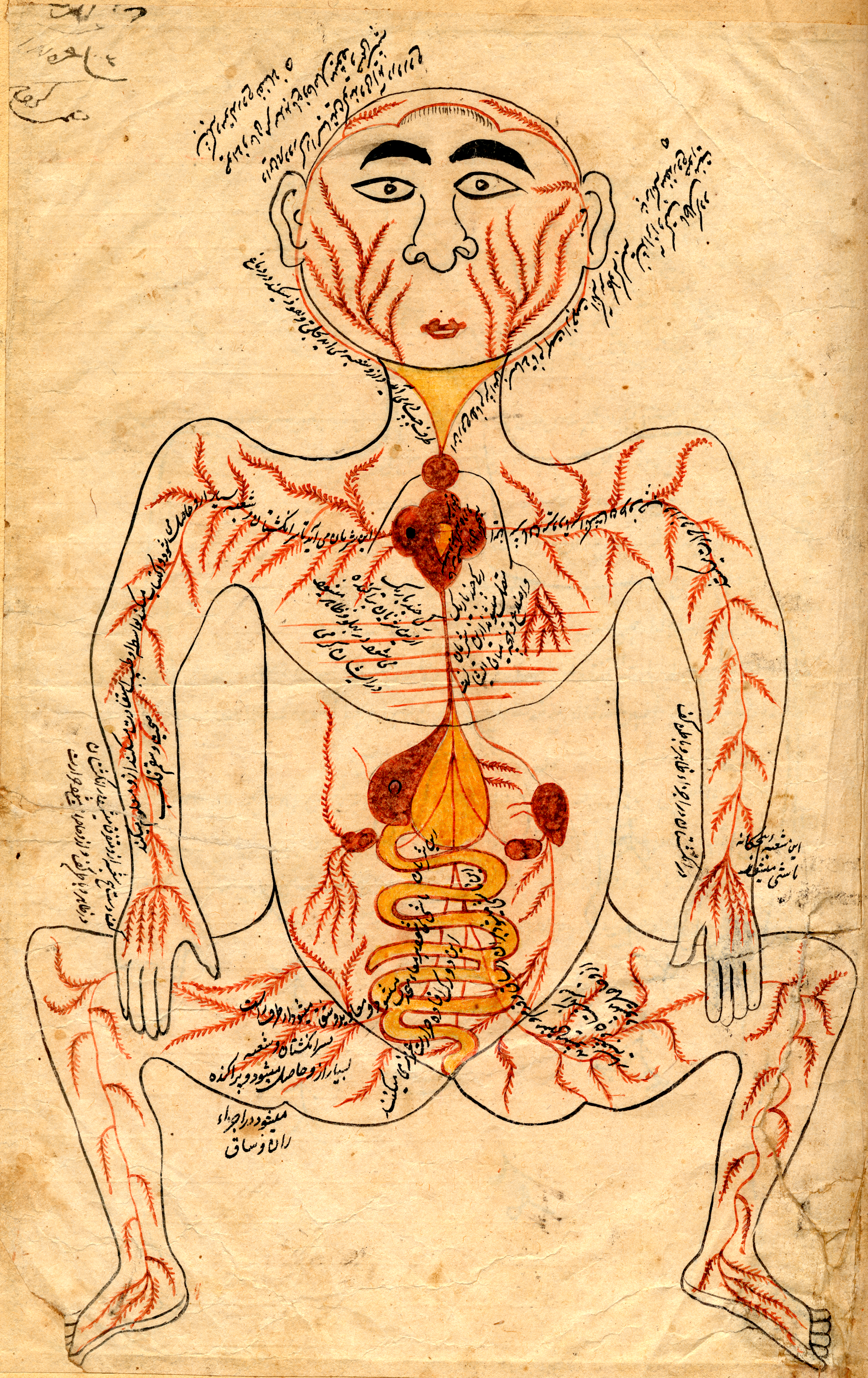
The Organs.

== See also ==
- Human anatomy
- History of anatomy
- Medicine in medieval Islam
