= Ancient Iranian medicine =

Study and practice of medicine in ancient Iran/Persia

Some of the earliest records of history of Ancient Iranian medicine can be found in Avesta, the primary collection of sacred texts of Zoroastrianism

The practice and study of medicine in Persia has a long and prolific history. The Iranian academic centers like Gundeshapur University (3rd century AD) were a breeding ground for the union among great scientists from different civilizations. These centers successfully followed their predecessors’ theories and greatly extended their scientific research through history. Persians were the first establishers of modern hospital system.

In recent years, some experimental studies have indeed evaluated medieval Iranian medical remedies using modern scientific methods. These studies raised the possibility of revival of traditional treatments on the basis of evidence-based medicine.

== History and background ==
=== Pre-Islamic ===
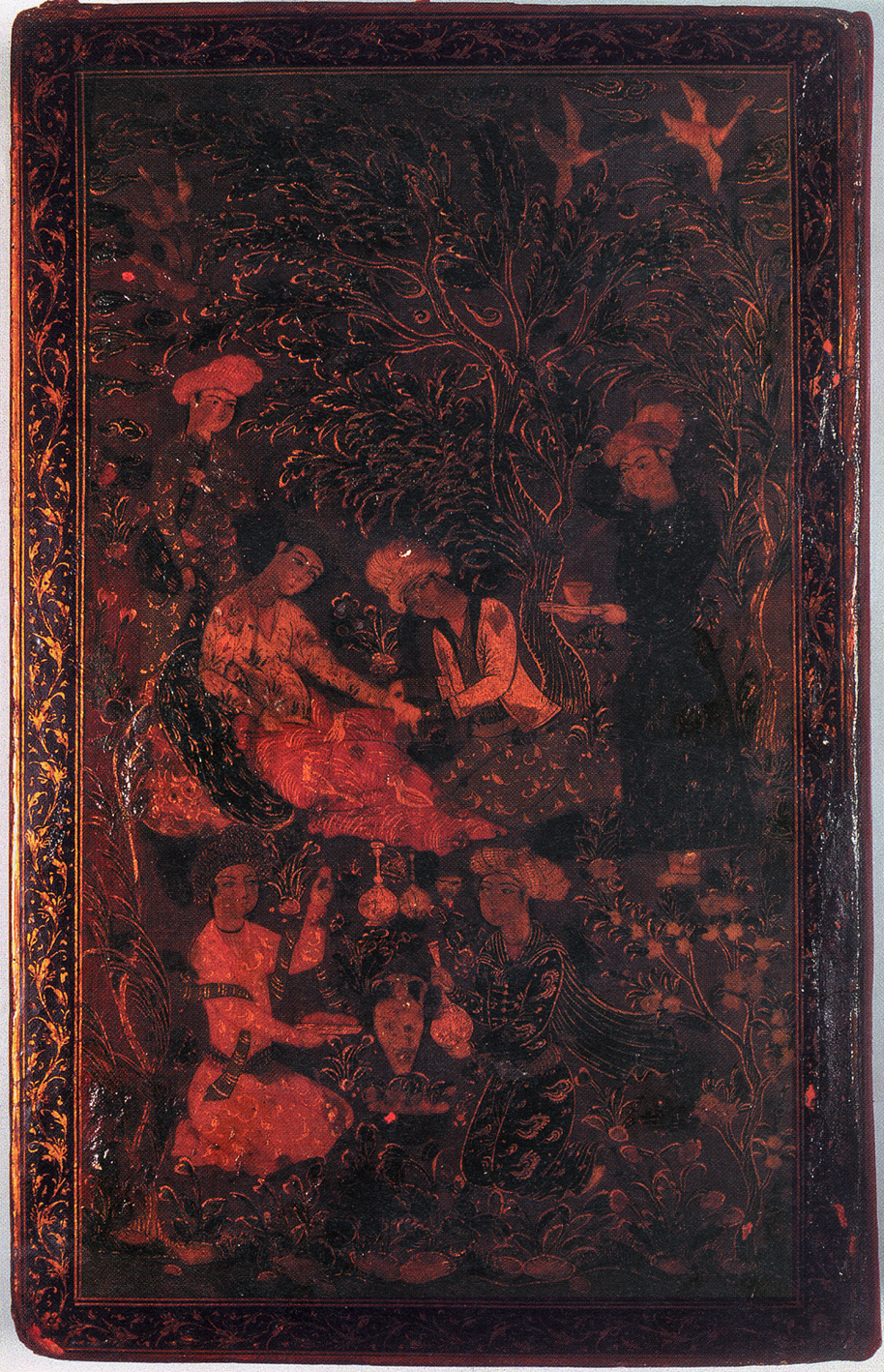
Safavid lacquer work illustrating a physician taking the pulse of a patient. From a 17th-century copy of Avicenna's Canon of Medicine. Wellcome Library, London.

The medical history of ancient Persia can be divided into three distinct periods. The sixth book of Zend-Avesta contains some of the earliest records of the history of ancient Iranian medicine. The Vendidad in fact devotes most of the last chapters to medicine.

The Vendidad, one of the surviving texts of the Zend-Avesta, distinguishes three kinds of medicine: medicine by the knife (surgery), medicine by herbs, and medicine by divine words; and the best medicine was, according to the Vendidad, healing by divine words:

Of all the healers O Spitama Zarathustra, namely those who heal with the knife, with herbs, and with sacred incantations, the last one is the most potent as he heals from the very source of diseases.

— Ardibesht Yasht

Although the Avesta mentions several notable physicians, the most notable—Mani, Roozbeh, and Bozorgmehr—were to emerge later.

The second epoch covers the era of what is known as Pahlavi literature, where the entire subject of medicine was systematically treated in an interesting tractate incorporated in the encyclopedic work of Dinkart, which listed in altered form some 4333 diseases.

The third era begins with the Achaemenid dynasty, and covers the period of Darius I of Persia, whose interest in medicine was said to be so great that he re-established the school of medicine in Sais, Egypt, which previously had been destroyed, restoring its books and equipment.

The first teaching hospital was the Academy of Gundishapur in the Persian Empire. Some experts go so far as to claim that, "to a very large extent, the credit for the whole hospital system must be given to Persia".

According to the Vendidad, physicians, to prove proficiency, had to cure three patients of the followers of Divyasnan; if they failed, they could not practice medicine. At first glance, this recommendation may appear discriminant and based on human experimentation. But some authors have construed this to mean that, from the beginning, physicians were taught to remove the mental barrier and to treat adversaries as well as friends. The physician's fee for service was based on the patient's income.

The practice of ancient Iranian medicine underwent a transformation following Arab invasion (630 A.D.). However, the advances of the Sassanid period were continued and expanded upon during the flourishing of Islamicate sciences at Baghdad, with the Arabic text Tārīkh al-ḥukamā crediting the Academy of Gondishapur for establishing licensure of physicians and proper medical treatment and training. However, modern historians of medicine have challenged the traditional narrative regarding the existence of a formal medical academy at Gondishapur. Recent scholarship, including works by Peter Pormann and Emilie Savage-Smith, indicates that there is no contemporary pre-Islamic evidence for a medical school or a teaching hospital at Gondishapur. They suggest that later Islamic historians likely projected the institutional structures of the Abbasid era back onto the Sassanid past to legitimize the Galenic medical tradition. Many Pahlavi scripts were translated into Arabic and the region of Greater Iran produced physicians and scientists such as Abū ʿAlī al-Ḥusayn ibn ʿAbd Allāh ibn Sīnā and Muhammad ibn Zakariya al-Razi as well as mathematicians such as Kharazmi and Omar Khayyám. They collected and systematically expanded the Greek, Indian, and Persian ancient medical heritage and made further discoveries.

=== Herodotus and Greek Perspectives ===
Greek accounts, particularly the Histories of Herodotus (5th century BC), provide some of the earliest external descriptions of Persian health practices. While these accounts offer valuable details, modern historians note that they are often framed through the lens of Greek cultural norms and the political tensions of the Graeco-Persian Wars.

Herodotus highlights the Persian emphasis on ritual purity, which incidentally overlapped with hygienic practices. He notes that individuals with conditions resembling leprosy (white sickness) were isolated from the general population to prevent "pollution," a practice Herodotus attributes to the belief that the afflicted had "sinned against the sun." Similarly, he describes strict prohibitions against urinating, spitting, or washing hands in rivers, as water was revered as a sacred element. While Herodotus presents these as religious observances, they functioned as effective preventative health measures regarding water sanitation.

The Histories also document the presence of foreign physicians at the Achaemenid court, reflecting a pragmatic approach to healthcare. A notable example is the account of Darius I, who sustained a severe ankle injury. Herodotus reports that after Egyptian physicians failed to alleviate the king's pain, Darius turned to the Greek physician Democedes of Croton, who successfully treated the injury using Greek remedies. This narrative is often cited by scholars to illustrate the interaction between Greek and Persian medical traditions, though Herodotus uses it rhetorically to contrast Greek skill (techne) with what he portrays as the limitations of other traditions.

Despite the frequent employment of foreign doctors, Persepolis Fortification Tablets indicate the existence of a state-supported rationing system that included provisions for local health workers, suggesting an organized internal infrastructure beyond what Greek sources describe. Scholars like François Hartog argue that Herodotus's depictions, including those of the Magi's healing rituals, often served to construct a "barbaric other" against which Greek identity was defined, rather than serving as a purely objective medical record.

=== Medieval Islamic Period ===
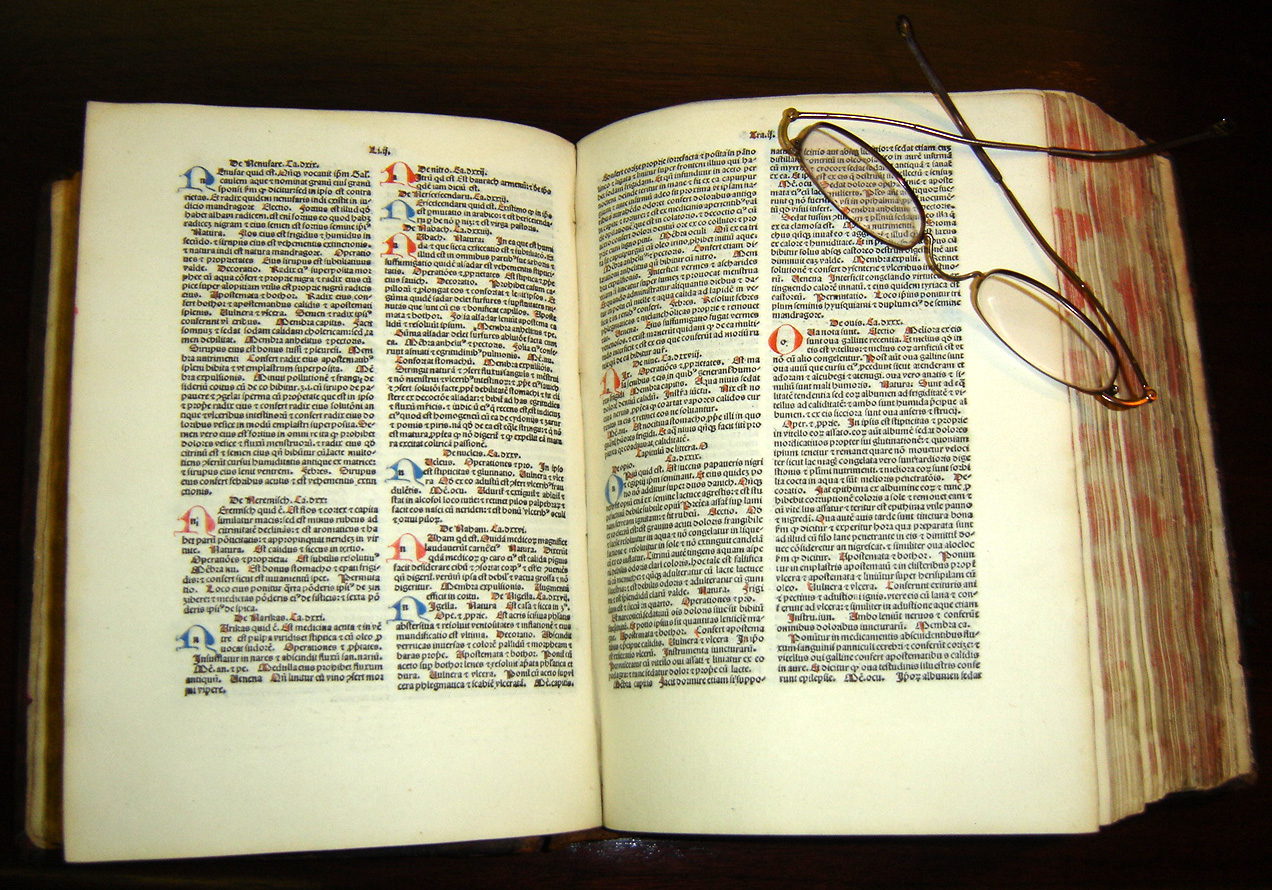
A 500-year-old Latin translation of the Canon of Medicine by Avicenna

One of the main roles played by medieval Iranian scholars in the scientific field was the conservation, consolidation, coordination, and development of ideas and knowledge in ancient civilizations. Some Iranian Hakim (practitioners) such as Muhammad ibn Zakariya ar-Razi, known to the West as Rhazes, and Ibn Sina, better known as Avicenna, were not only responsible for accumulating all the existing information on medicine of the time, but adding to this knowledge by their own astute observations, experimentation and skills. "Qanoon fel teb of Avicenna" ("The Canon") and "Kitab al-Hawi of Razi" ("Continens") were among the central texts in Western medical education from the 13th to the 18th centuries.

In the 14th century, the Persian language medical work Tashrih al-badan (Anatomy of the body), by Mansur ibn Ilyas (c. 1390), contained comprehensive diagrams of the body's structural, nervous and circulatory systems.

=== Cranial surgery and mental health ===
Evidence of surgery dates to the 3rd century BC when the first cranial surgery was performed in the Shahr-e-Sukhteh (Burnt City) in south-eastern Iran. The archaeological studies on the skull of a 13-year-old girl suffering from hydrocephaly indicated that she had undergone cranial surgery to take a part of her skull bone and the girl lived for at least 6 months after the surgery.

Several documents still exist from which the definitions and treatments of a headache in medieval Persia can be ascertained. These documents give detailed and precise clinical information on the different types of headaches. The medieval physicians listed various signs and symptoms, apparent causes, and hygienic and dietary rules for prevention of headaches. The medieval writings are both accurate and vivid, and they provide long lists of substances used in the treatment of headaches. Many of the approaches of physicians in medieval Persia are accepted today; however, still more of them could be of use to modern medicine. An antiepileptic drug-therapy plan in medieval Iranian medicine is individualized, given different single and combined drug-therapy with a dosing schedule for each of those. Physicians stress the importance of dose, and route of administration and define a schedule for drug administration. Recent animal experiments confirm the anticonvulsant potency of some of the compounds which are recommended by Medieval Iranian practitioners in epilepsy treatment.

In The Canon of Medicine (c. 1025), Avicenna described numerous mental conditions, including hallucination, insomnia, mania, nightmare, melancholia, dementia, epilepsy, paralysis, stroke, vertigo and tremor.

=== Obstetrics and gynecology ===
In the 10th century work of Shahnama, Ferdowsi describes a Caesarean section performed on Rudaba, during which a special wine agent was prepared by a Zoroastrian priest and used as an anesthetic to produce unconsciousness for the operation. Although largely mythical in content, the passage illustrates working knowledge of anesthesia in ancient Persia.

== See also ==
- Iranian traditional medicine
- Science and technology in Iran
- Medicine in the medieval Islamic world
- Unani medicine
