= Mansur ibn Ilyas =

Persian physician

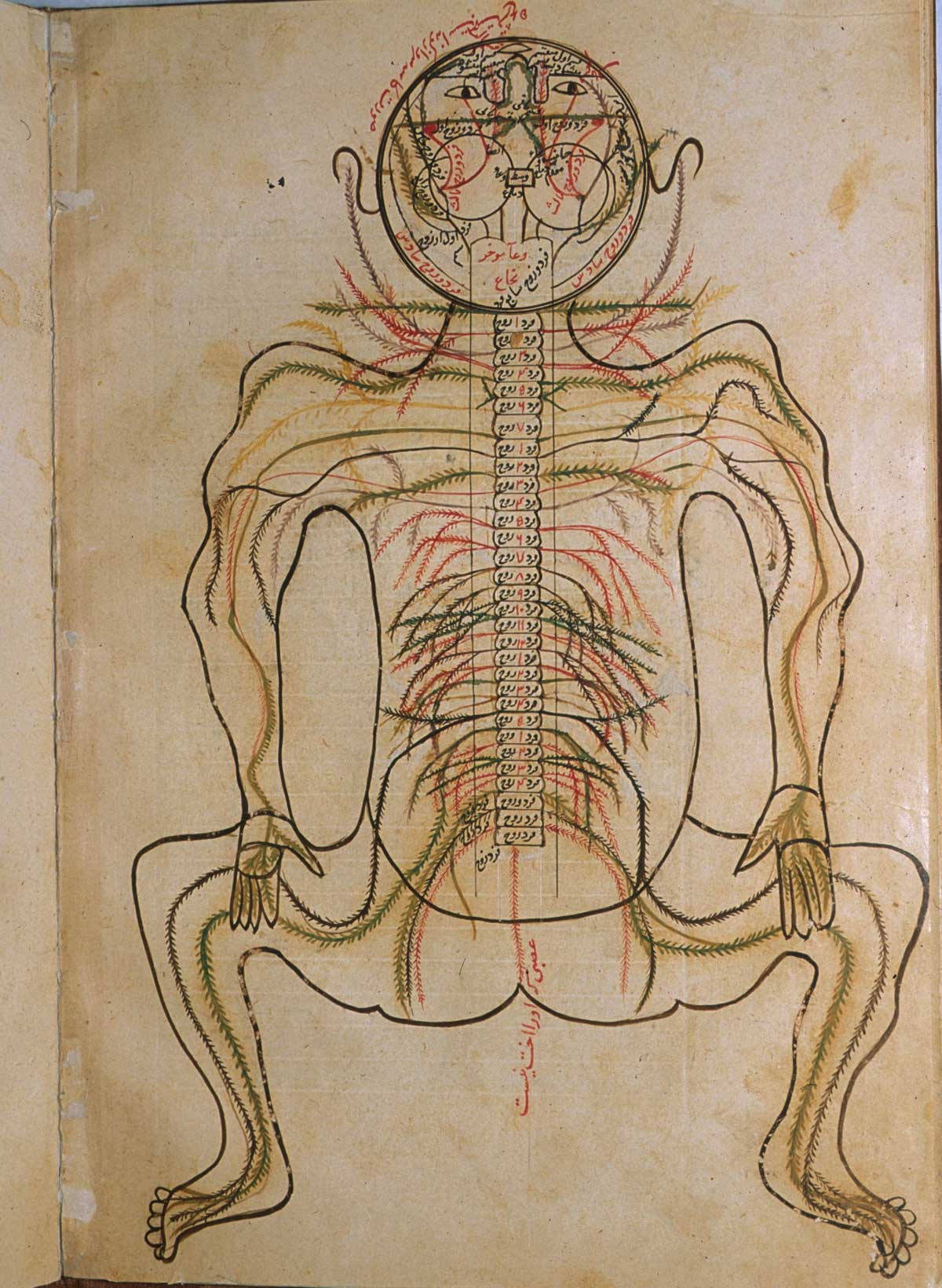
One of Mansur ibn Ilyas' colored illustrations of human anatomy. This illustration highlights the arterial and nervous systems as viewed from behind. From: Mansur ibn Ilyas: Tashrīḥ-i badan-i insān. تشريح بدن انسان. Manuscript, ca. 1450, U.S. National Library of Medicine.

Manṣūr ibn Muḥammad ibn Aḥmad ibn Yūsuf Ibn Ilyās (منصور ابن محمد ابن احمد ابن يوسف ابن الياس) was a late 14th-century and early 15th-century Persian physician from Shiraz, Timurid Persia, commonly known for his publication of the colored atlas of the human body, Mansur's Anatomy. It is important to know that al-Jurjani (1040–1136) published a book called "Zakhireye Khwarazmshahi" which Mansur could have copied the illustrations from his book.

== Early life and education ==
Mansur ibn Ilyas was born in the mid-14th century in the city of Shiraz, located in the providence of Fars in central Persia, in what is modern day Shiraz, Iran. He was born into a wealthy and well respected family. Mansur received most of his education from his family in Shiraz, who were also well established scholars, physicians, and active as jurists and poets. He was educated in traditional schools in the Persian province of Fars and traveled to many other cities, which assisted in his education. Most notably, Mansur traveled several times to the city of Tabriz, which was known for its rich scientific background.

== Notable works ==
Mansur wrote many medical manuscripts ranging from a synopsis of general medicine, Kifaya-yi Mansuri (Persian: کفایه منصوری), to Tashrih-i Mansuri (تشریح منصوری), a system-based anatomical work complete with colored illustrations of different organ systems. He dedicated both of his major medical writings, a general medical encyclopedia, and a study of anatomy to rulers of the Persian province of Fars, Prince Pir Mohammad Bahador Khan, the grandson of Tamerlane. Throughout his works, Mansur engaged in then-controversial topics, and made references to the works of Aristotle, Hippocrates, al-Razi, and Avicenna.

The work he was most known for was his, Tashrīḥ-i badan-i insān (تشریح بدن انسان, The Anatomy of the Human Body) (MS P 19), also known as Mansur's Anatomy (تشریح منصوری Tashrīḥi Manṣūri) Commissioned by Zayn al-Abidin (زین العابدین), an important political figure in being the last Muzaffarid ruler of Fars, Mansur's Anatomy is a medical treatise of about forty manuscript folios. It consists of seven sections: an introduction, five chapters covering the osseous, nervous, muscular, venous, and arterial systems, and an appendix on the formation of the fetus and compound organs, such as the heart. Instead of discussing interrelated functions of organs, he discussed organs based on their hierarchical ordering of functionality-related groups according to their importance to the life of the body. In this manner he discussed the anatomy of the vital and respiratory organs, and then the anatomy of the organs of nourishment, perception, and finally, reproduction. A concluding section on compound organs, such as the heart and brain, and on the formation of the fetus, was illustrated with a diagram showing a pregnant woman. Mansur's Anatomy is chiefly recognized for its inclusion of such colored anatomical illustrations, the first of its kind in the Arabic world.

Physicians and philosophers often argued whether the heart or brain was formed first in the fetus, and this debate forms an important part of Mansur ibn Ilyas' written works. In his works, Mansur ibn Ilyas argues that the heart is the first organ to form, unlike Hippocrates who argued that the brain is the first organ. Mansur ibn Ilyas' reasoning for the heart as the primary organ was that the semen is composed of air and strong heat, creating a substance called pneuma, which needs to be contained or it will decompose. The containment of the pneuma is within the heart, creating the body and making the heart the main source of the body's natural heat. The heart also acts as the main force in forming the other organs; using the heat from the heart, the heart is able to provide the rest of the body with nourishment. This marks the start of the formation of the liver, which holds the source of nourishment within it. Lastly, Mansur argued that the brain is the organ that contains the senses, and these senses are what gives life force to the body. If the brain is formed first, like Hippocrates said, then there is nothing for the brain to give life to. The heart needs to be formed before the brain, so that the brain can give its life force to the rest of the body. Throughout his works, Mansur made references to the works of Aristotle, Hippocrates, al-Razi, and Avicenna.

Kifāyah-i Mujāhidīyah كفايه مجاهديه (MS P 28, item 4) (The Sufficient [book] for Mujahid

== Impact ==
While Mansur's Anatomy was not the first notation of the human body, it is considered to be the first color atlas ever created. This document led to a great deal of change in the way the Islamic world viewed human anatomy at the time, as until this point a color atlas was considered to be against Islamic law. Mansur ibn Ilyas is also credited with one of the earliest anatomical sketches of a pregnant woman; while many believe his other illustrations to have been inspired by earlier Latin and Greek writings, the pregnant woman is considered an original work.

== See also ==
- List of Iranian scientists
