= List of post-classical medical doctors =

List of medical doctors between the 5th and 15th centuries CE

The following is a list of medical doctors who were known to have practised, contributed, or theorised about medicine in some form between the 5th and 15th century CE.

Name	Gender	Related periods	Century	Ethnicity	Known for
Theophilus Protospatharius	Man	Middle Ages	7th century CE	Greek	
Palladius	Man	Middle Ages	6th century CE	Greek	
Marcellus Empiricus	Man	Late antiquity	4th–5th century CE	Roman	Author of pharmacological compendium De medicamentis
Caelius Aurelianus	Man	Late antiquity	5th century CE	Greco-Roman	Medical translator.
Adamantius Judaeus	Man	Late antiquity	5th century CE	Greco-Roman Jew	
Benedict of Nursia	Man	Middle Ages	6th century CE	Italian	Founder of "monastic medicine"
Alexander of Tralles	Man	Middle Ages	6th-7th century CE	Byzantine	
Aetius of Amida	Man	Middle Ages	6th century CE	Byzantine Greek	
Stephanus of Athens	Man	Middle Ages	6th-7th century CE	Byzantine Greek	
Raban Gamaliel VI	Man	Late antiquity	4th-5th century CE	Roman Jew	
Isidore of Seville	Man	Middle Ages	6th-7th century CE	Byzantine	
Paul of Aegina	Man	Middle Ages	7th century CE	Byzantine	Wrote Medical Compendium in Seven Books
Leo Itrosophist	Man	Middle Ages	8th-9th century CE	Byzantine	Wrote "Epitome of Medicine".
Al-Kindi	Man	Islamic Golden Age	9th century CE	Arab	Author of De Gradibus
Yuhanna ibn Masawaih	Man	Islamic Golden Age	8th-9th century CE	Persian	Personal physician to four Abbasid caliphs.
Hunayn ibn Ishaq	Man	Islamic Golden Age	9th century CE	Arab Christian	
al-Tabari	Man	Islamic Golden Age	9th century CE	Persian	Produced one of the first encyclopedia of medicine titled Firdous al-Hikmah ("Paradise of wisdom").
Theodosius Romanus	Man	Islamic Golden Age	9th century CE	Syriac Christian	
Ishaq ibn Hunayn	Man	Islamic Golden Age	10th century CE	Arab Christian	
Yahya ibn Sarafyun	Man	Islamic Golden Age	9th century CE	Syriac Christian	
al-Razi	Man	Islamic Golden Age	9th-10th century CE	Persian	Produce work in pediatrics and makes the first clear distinction between smallpox and measles in his al-Hawi.
Isaac Israeli ben Solomon	Man	Islamic Golden Age	9th-10th century CE	Egyptian Jew	
Shabbethai Donnolo	Man	Middle Ages	10th century CE	Graeco-Italian Jew	
al-Tamimi	Man	Islamic Golden Age	10th century CE	Arab	
al-Majusi	Man	Islamic Golden Age	10th century CE	Persian	Famous for the Kitab al-Maliki or Complete Book of the Medical Art, his textbook on medicine and psychology.
al-Zahrawi	Man	Islamic Golden Age	10th-11th century CE	Arab Andalusian	Founder of early surgical and medical instruments, writing Kitab al-Tasrif.
Ibn Butlan	Man	Islamic Golden Age	11th century CE	Arab Christian	Writer of Taqwīm as‑Siḥḥa [romanization: Tacuinum Sanitatis] or maintenance of health.
Michael Psellos	Man	Middle Ages	11th century CE	Byzantine Greek	
Ibn al-Haytham	Man	Islamic Golden Age	10th-11th century CE	Arab	
Ibn Sina	Man	Islamic Golden Age	10th-11th century CE	Persian	Writer of Qanun-e dâr Tâb or The Canon of Medicine.
Simeon Seth	Man	Middle Ages	11th-12 century CE	Byzantine Jew	
Constantine the African	Man	Middle Ages	11th century CE	Unclear	
Anna Komnene	Woman	Middle Ages	11th-12 century CE	Byzantine	
Trota of Salerno	Woman	Middle Ages	12th century CE	Unclear	
Rahere	Man	Middle Ages	12th century CE	Anglo-Norman	Founded the Priory of the Hospital of St Bartholomew in 1123.
Stephen of Pisa	Man	Middle Ages	12th century CE	Italian	Translated works of Hali Abbas (the al-Kitab al-Maliki, by Ali Abbas al-Majusi), translated around 1127 into Latin as Liber regalis dispositionis.
Ibn Zuhr	Man	Islamic Golden Age	11th-12 century CE	Arab Andalusian	
Ibn Rushd	Man	Islamic Golden Age	12th century CE	Arab Andalusian	
Matthaeus Platearius	Man	Middle Ages	12th century CE	Unclear	
Pope Innocent III	Man	Middle Ages	12th-13th century CE	Italian	Organized the hospital of Santo Spirito at Rome inspiring others all over Europe
Ibn an-Nafis	Man	Islamic Golden Age	13th century CE	Arab	Suggests that the right and left ventricles of the heart are separate and discovers the pulmonary circulation and coronary circulation.
Ibn al-Baytar	Man	Islamic Golden Age	12th-13th century CE	Arab Andalusian	Wrote on botany and pharmacy, studied animal anatomy and medicine veterinary medicine.
Roger Bacon	Man	Middle Ages	13th century CE	English	Ideas on experimental science and convex lens spectacles for treating long-sightedness.
Pietro d'Abano	Man	Middle Ages	13th-14th century CE	Italian	Professor of medicine at the University of Padua.
Joannes Actuarius	Man	Middle Ages	13th-14th century CE	Byzantine	Wrote the last great compendium of Byzantine medicine
Ibn Qayyim al-Jawziyya	Man	Islamic Golden Age	13th-14th century CE	Unclear	
William of Saliceto	Man	Middle Ages	13th century CE	Italian	
Henri de Mondeville	Man	Middle Ages	13th-14th century CE	French	
Mondino de Luzzi	Man	Middle Ages	13th-14th century CE	Italian	carried out the first systematic human dissections since Herophilus of Chalcedon and Erasistratus of Ceos 1500 years earlier.
Guy de Chauliac	Man	Middle Ages	14th century CE	French	
John Arderne	Man	Middle Ages	14th century CE	English	
Heinrich von Pfolspeundt	Man	Middle Ages	15th century CE	German	

== Notes ==
1. Assumed gender.
