= Moses Galina =

Moses ben Elijah Galina (Hebrew: משה בן אליהו גלינו, romanized: Moshe ben Eliyahu Galino; fl. 15th century) (Note: His name is sometimes erroneously given as Elijah ben Moses Galina.) was a Jewish pseudoscientific writer and translator from Candia.

He is best known for his work Toledot Adam, published in Constantinople in 1515, on chiromancy and physiognomy. The work draws primarily from 'Ali ibn 'Abbas' Kamil al-Ṣina'ah and the pseudo-Aristotelian treatise Secretum. It was later condensed and released with a translation into Yiddish under the title Ḥokhmat ha-yad.

Galina published several translations from Arabic into Hebrew, including Sefer mezuḳḳaḳ, an astronomical treatise by Omar ibn Mohammed Meṣuman; Mishpaṭ ha-mabbaṭim, an astrological treatise; and Sefer ha-goralot, a treatise on geomancy.
