= Georgios Nomikos =

Greek painter (1638/1643 – 1712)

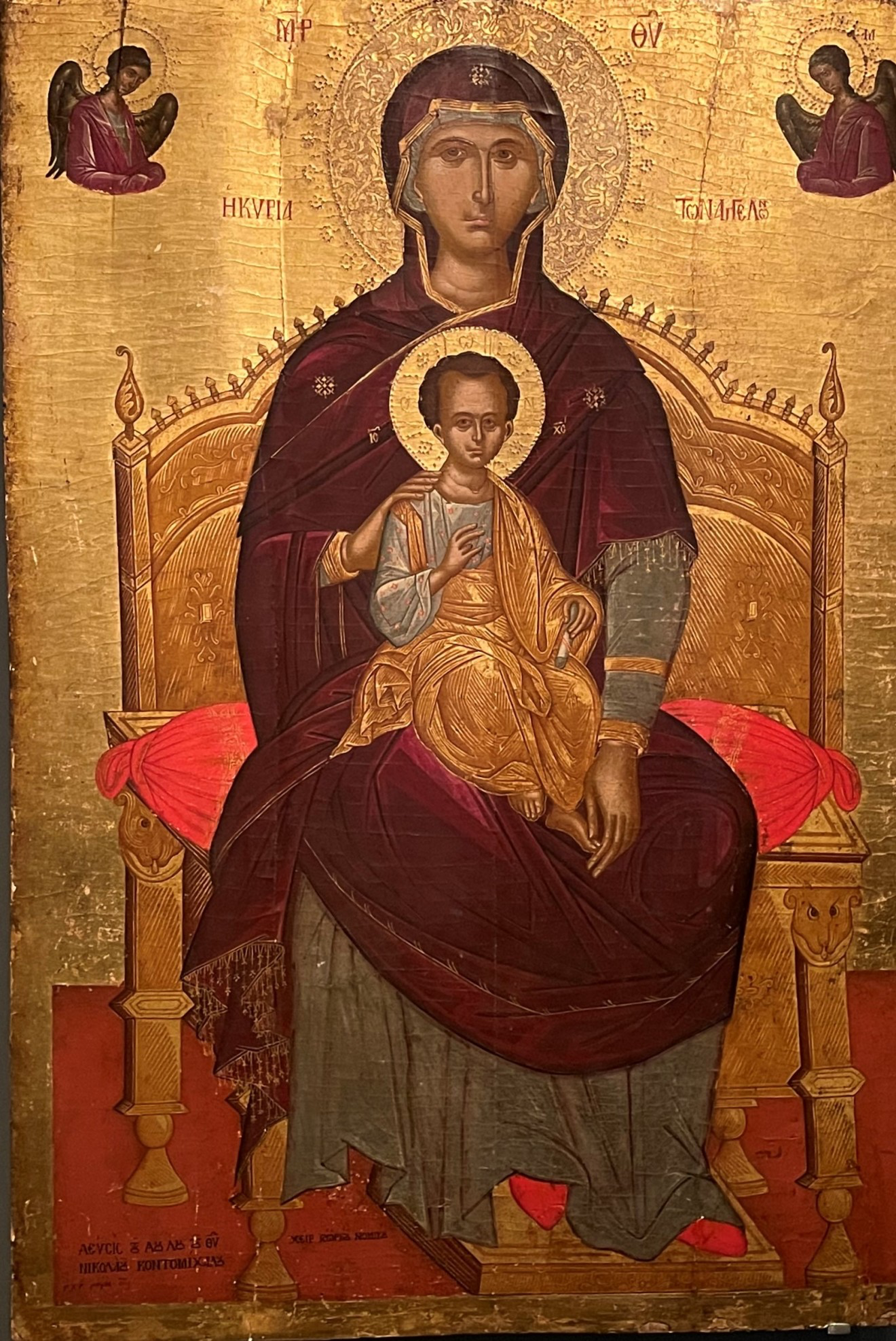
- Lady of the Angels
- Born: 1638/1643; Crete
- Died: 1712; Ioannina
- Known for: Iconography and hagiography
- Movement: Cretan school

Georgios Nomikos (Greek: Γεώργιος Νομικός; 1638/1643 – 1712) was a Greek Baroque painter. He converted to Christianity from Judaism. He was a member of the Cretan school and the Heptanese (Ionian) school. His contemporaries were Georgios Kastrofylakas, Theodore Poulakis, and Georgios Markou. He shared the same last name with famous Greek painter Demetrios Nomikos. He was active on the island of Zakynthos, Kefalonia Arta and Ioannina. Six of his paintings survived. Some of his frescos have survived in the destroyed church of Saint George in Lingiades, Ioannina. His work represents an evolution from the art of Angelos Akotantos and Elias Moskos to a more refined technique influenced by the art of the Ionian Islands.

== History ==
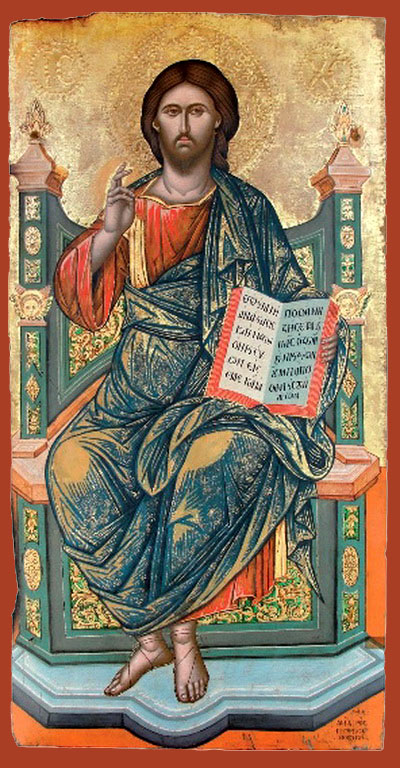
Christ Enthroned

He was born on the island of Crete during the middle of the 17th century. Records exist from 1672-1705. He was born to a Jewish family. He converted to Christianity to become a painter and monk. The first existing record of Georgios was around 1672. He was working as a painter on the island of Zakynthos. According to the signature on one of his icons, he converted to Christianity in 1676. On May 9, 1687, he was enlisted as a brother of the Monastery of Saint Nicholas of Xenon in Kefalonia. He was hired to paint the iconostasis. His name was also found in the church of Faneromeni in Kefalonia.

In 1699, according to signatures and dates on two icons and a pulpit the painter was in Arta. In 1705, he was in Ioannina. He painted frescos at the destroyed church of Agios Georgios in the village of Lingiades. The inscription in the church reveals that the painter came from Crete. That same year the painter created a despotic icon of Christ for the monastery of Vyliza in the village of Matsouki, Ioannina. The painter died around 1712.

The signature on his work was χειρ Γεωργίου Νομικού ήμουνα Όβρέος καί γίνηκα Χριστιανός (by the hand of Georgios Nomikos I was a Jew and became Christian). Georgios was not the only Greek painter associated with the Jewish community. On November 19, 1499, Andreas Pavias signed a contract to teach Aquilo Souloum. He was a Jewish youth. Pavias taught him Greek painting, reading, and writing for eight years.

== See also ==
- Constantine the Jew
- Demetrios Nomikos

== Bibliography ==
- Hatzidakis, Manolis (1987). Greek painters after the fall (1450-1830) Volume A. Athens, GR: Center for Modern Greek Studies E.I.E.
- Hatzidakis, Manolis & Drakopoulou, Eugenia (1997). Greek painters after the fall (1450-1830) Volume B. Athens, GR: Center for Modern Greek Studies E.I.E.
- Drakopoulou, Eugenia (2010). Greek painters after the fall (1450-1830) Volume C. Athens, GR: Center for Modern Greek Studies E.I.E.
