= Liber pantegni =

- The first part, Pantegni pars prima theorica (lib. I-X), is kept at the National library of the Netherlands, KB 73 J 6
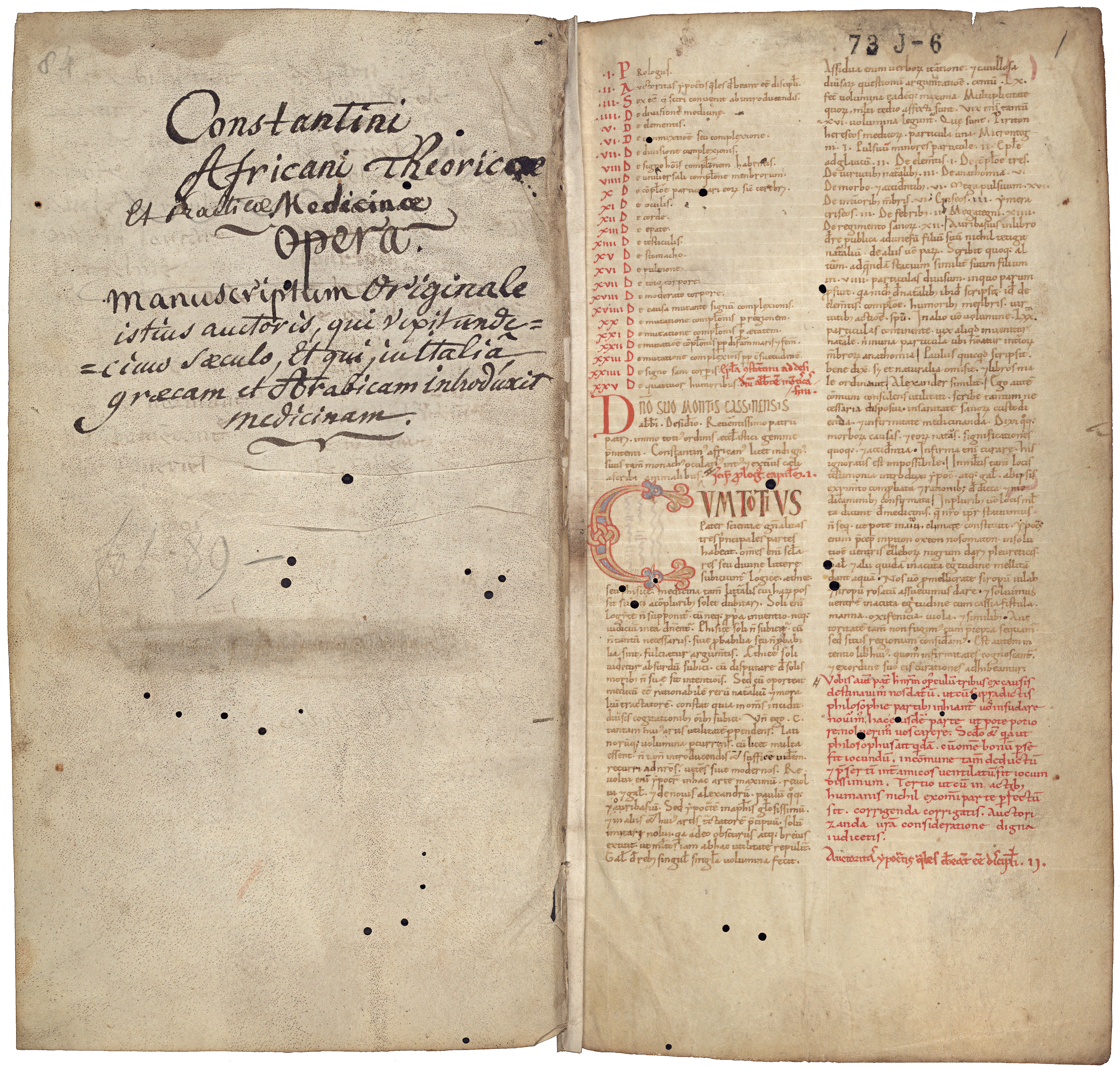
- Eleventh-century manuscript version of the Liber pantegni, National library of the Netherlands
- Type: Codex
- Date: 11th century, prior to 1086
- Place of origin: Monte Cassino, Italy
- Language(s): Latin, translated from Arabic
- Compiled by: Constantinus Africanus
- Dedicated to: Abbot Desiderius of Monte Cassino(1027-1087), before he became Pope Victor III.: Folio 1r, middle of left column: Cum totius pater scientiae generalitas tres principales partes habeat [...].; Folio 87v: Explicit prima pars pantegni scilicet theorica. Amen
- Material: Parchment
- Size: The first part, Pantegni pars prima theorica (lib. I-X) has 89 folios measuring 235 x 128 mm. Text block: 189 × 98 mm
- Format: 2 columns, 62 lines
- Script: Littera pregothica
- Additions: Various recipes and other medical texts were added to the front (folios Ir-IIv) and back (folios 87v-89r) of the manuscript in 12th and 13th century.
- Exemplar(s): This codex is in large parts a translation from the Arabic of the Kitab al-Malaki (Royal Book) of Ali ibn al-Abbas al-Majusi (Ali Abbas, died after 977).
- Discovered: The earliest known copy, which had first been studied in 1909, was recognized in 2010 as having been made at Monte Cassino during Constantine's lifetime.
- Accession: Description of the 11th century copy in the catalogue of the KB
- Other: Digitized version, website KB

The Liber pantegni (παντεχνῆ "[encompassing] all [medical] arts") is a medieval medical text compiled by Constantinus Africanus (died before 1098/99) prior to 1086. Constantine’s Pantegni has been called “the first fully comprehensive medical text in Latin.” There was, of course, a substantial body of Latin medical writing circulating in western Europe in the early Middle Ages, but the Pantegni was the first text to bring together, in one place, a broad array of learning on anatomy, physiology, and therapeutics. It was dedicated to Abbot Desiderius of Monte Cassino, before he became Pope Victor III in 1086. In 2010, a manuscript at the Hague known to scholars since the early 20th century, but little studied, was recognized as being the earliest copy of the Pantegni, made at Monte Cassino under Constantine's supervision.

The Pantegni is a compendium of Hellenistic and Islamic medicine, for the most part a translation from the Arabic of the Kitab al-Malaki "Royal Book" (also called the Kitāb Kāmil aṣ-ṣinā'a aṭ-ṭibbīya, "the complete"—or "perfect"—"book of the medical art") of Ali ibn al-Abbas al-Majusi. A distinction is made between theorica and practica, as it has been made before in the so-called Isagoge Johannitii, an earlier medical text that was originally written by Hunayn ibn Ishaq. Each part of al-Majusi's original, Theorica and Practica, had had ten books. The Theorica was translated in its entirety. However, in Constantine's version, the Practica was never completed, perhaps because of damage that occurred when Constantine brought his books from North Africa to Italy. Extant manuscripts show that initially only a three-book Practica was in circulation in the early part of the 12th century, consisting of Book I on regimen, the first half of Book II on simple (uncompounded) medicinal substances, and the first third of Book IX on surgery. Interest in the surgical material prompted two subsequent translators, a converted Muslim and a Christian physician from Pisa, to complete the translation of Book IX in 1114-15, during a siege of the Balearic Islands.

Research by Monica H. Green and Iolanda Ventura has demonstrated, however, that more of the Pantegni, Practica seems to have been translated by Constantine, perhaps toward the end of his life, than scholars had hitherto known. Green established that at least three twelfth-century manuscripts contain translations of Books VI and VII (on diseases of the thorax and gastro-intestinal system, respectively). Ventura not only identified the existence of a mid-twelfth-century manuscript copy of the tenth book of the Practica, the antidotarium (on compound drugs), but she also established that Constantine (or an associate) did complete the translation of the second half of Book II of the Practica, translating the section on simple (uncompounded) medicines.

There were, in other words, bits and pieces of at least six of the ten books of the Pantegni, Practica in circulation in the 12th century. But they were scattered and in some cases incoherent. A devotee of the Constantinian project did not give up the goal of seeing the Practica finally made whole. Perhaps as late as the early thirteenth century, this still anonymous editor pieced together a "complete" version of the Practica, gathering all the sections that Constantine had translated himself and fusing them with excerpts from several of Constantine's other translations (such as the Viaticum and his translation of Isaac Israeli's 10th-century book on fevers) and weaving them together into what passed as al-Majusi's full ten-book treatise. This "re-created" twenty-book Pantegni (now joining together the 10 books of the Theorica and the newly constituted 10 books of the Practica) began to circulate by the second quarter of the 13th century and would be printed in 1515 under Isaac Israeli's name.

In 1127, Stephen of Antioch, a Pisan notary working in the Crusader state of Antioch, criticized the incompleteness and poor quality of Constantine's Pantegni and re-translated al-Majusi's Arabic treatise anew. This was known as the Liber regalis dispositionis. Nevertheless, Constantine's Pantegni proved to be the far more influential text; it now survives in over 100 manuscript copies, whereas Stephen's Liber regalis survives in only eight. In addition, the Pantegni would be turned to by a variety of compilers and medical writers as a source for specific information on anatomy and physiology. The section on reproductive anatomy, for example, was excerpted early in the 12th century and would form the foundation for beliefs about generation for centuries to come.

== Impression of the manuscript (Koninklijke Bibliotheek) ==
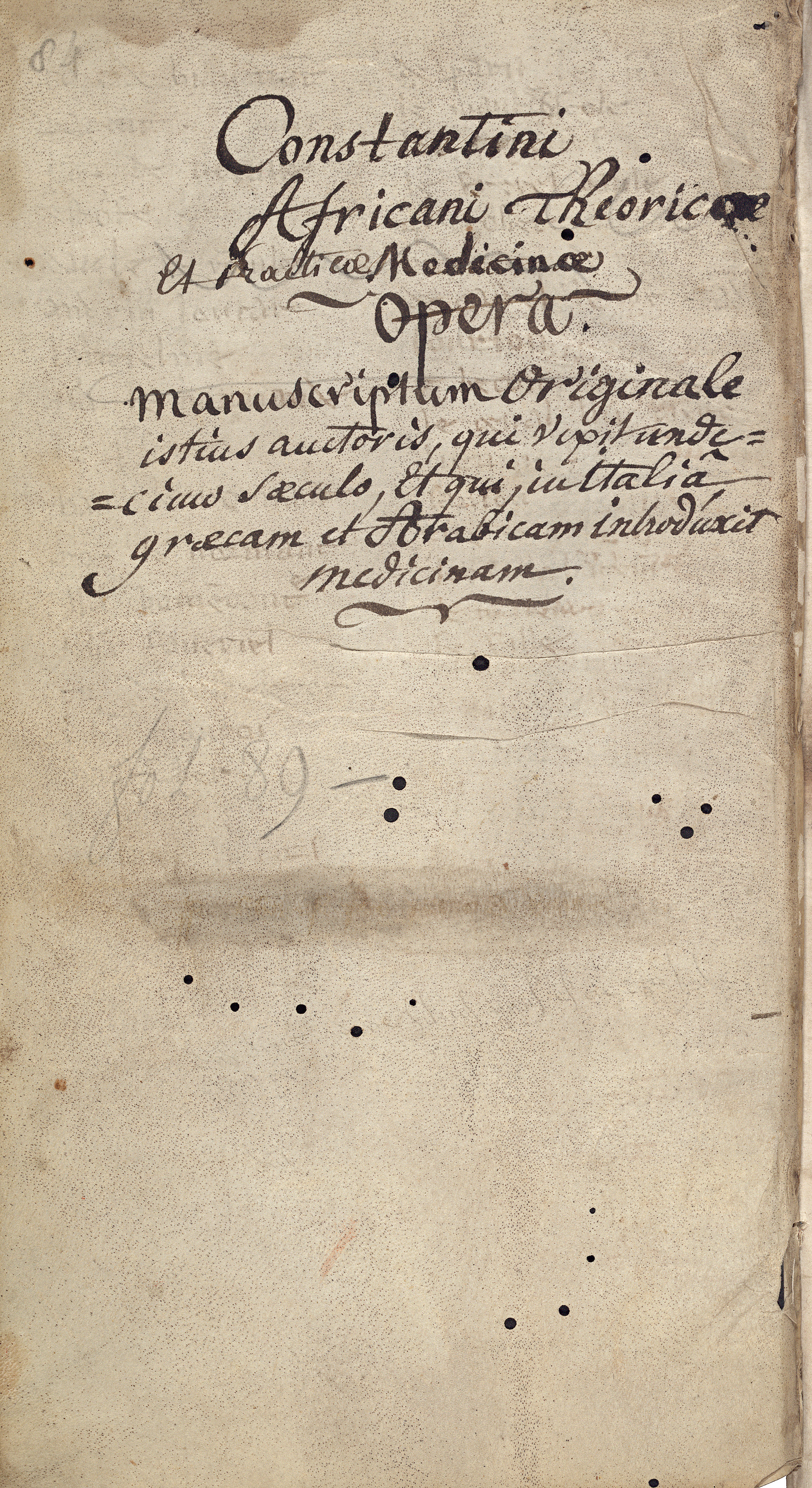
viii

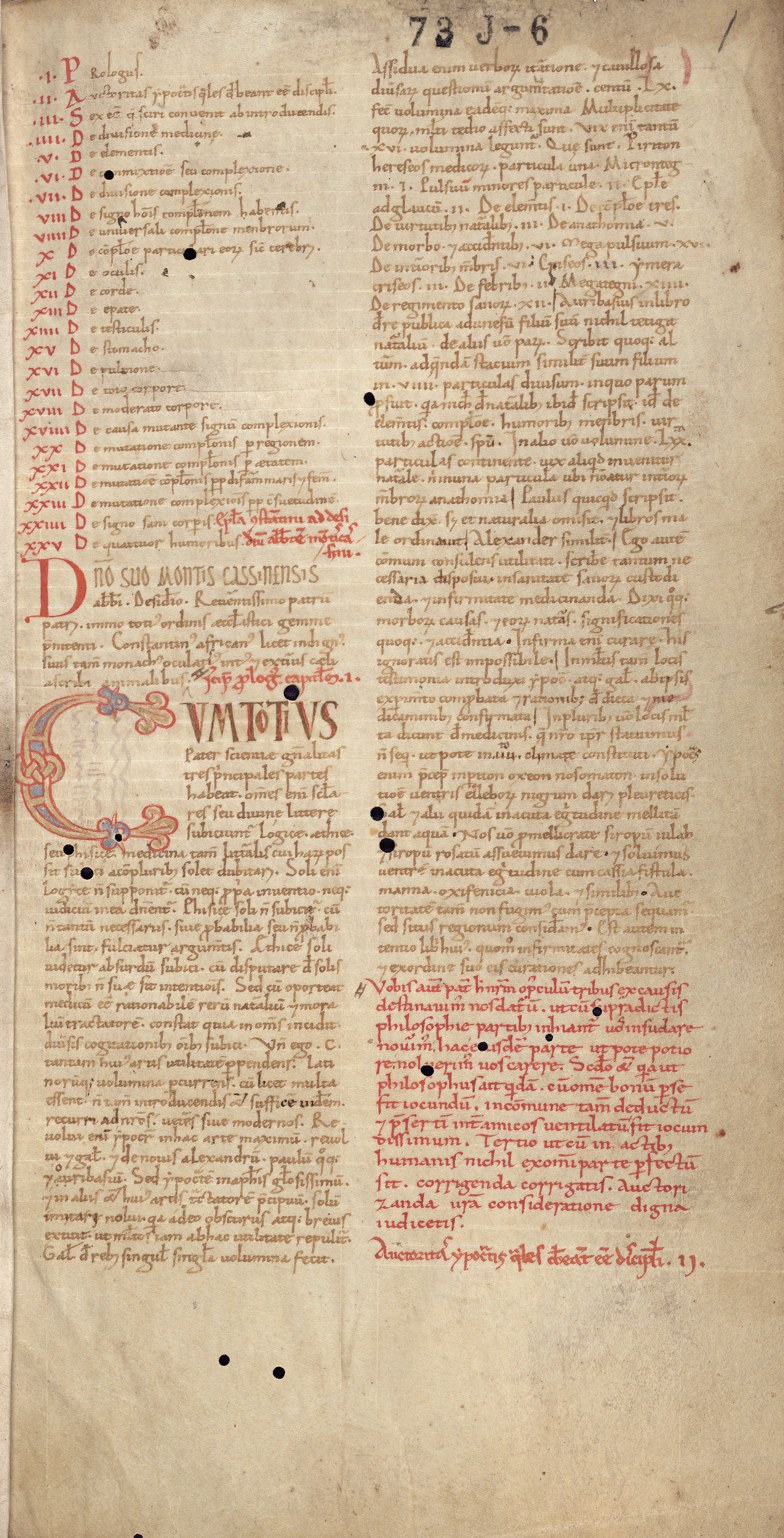
f. 001r

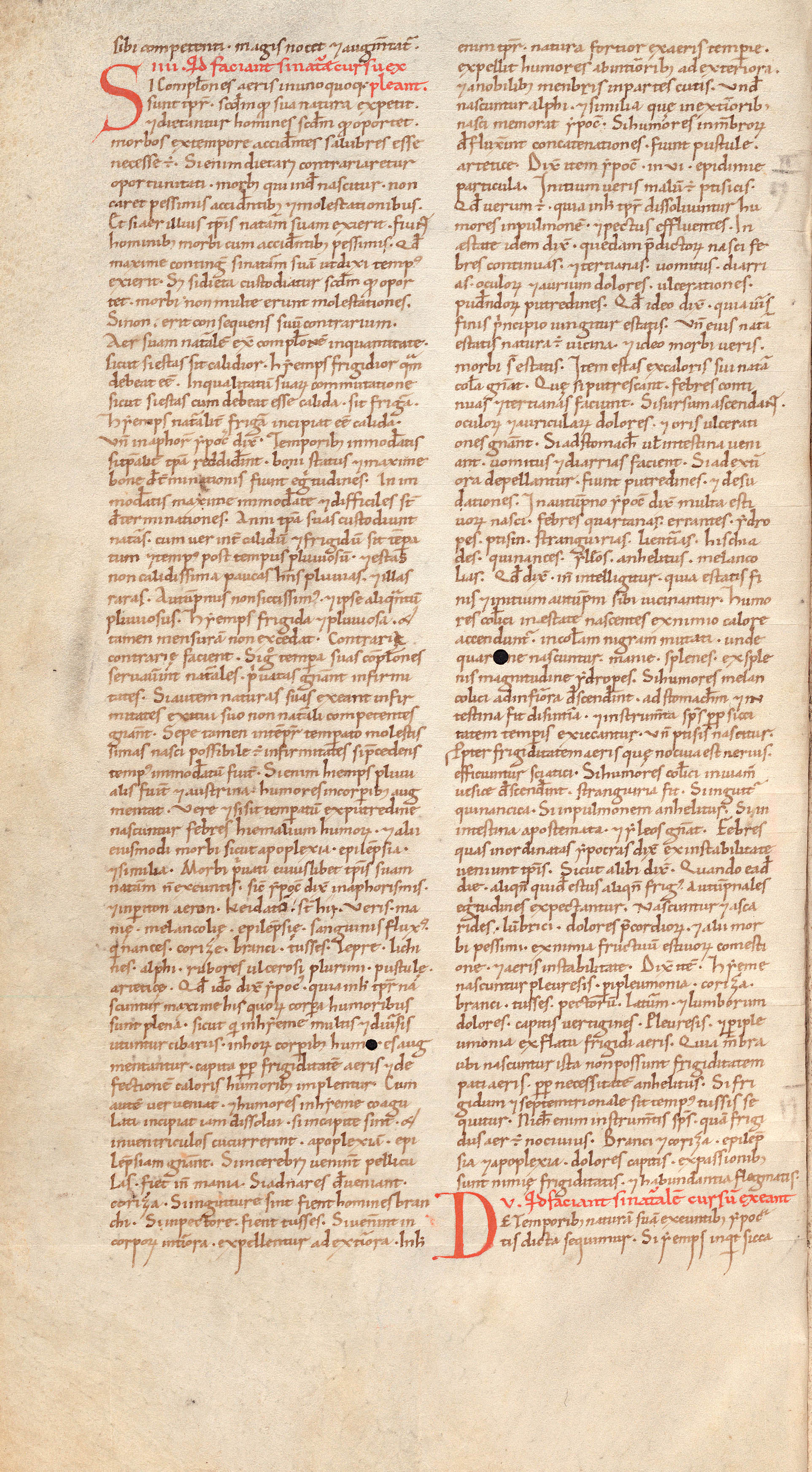
f. 026v

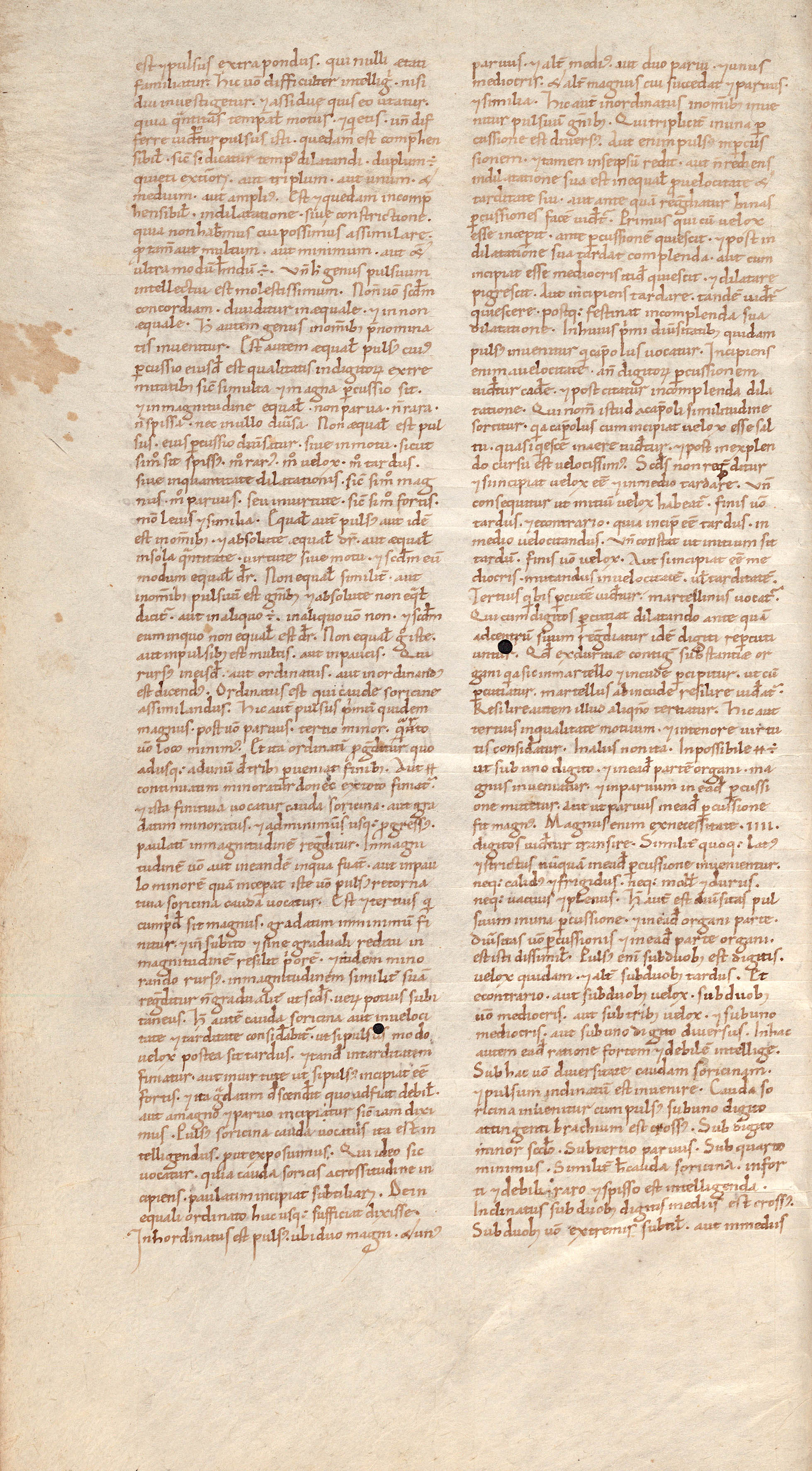
f. 045v

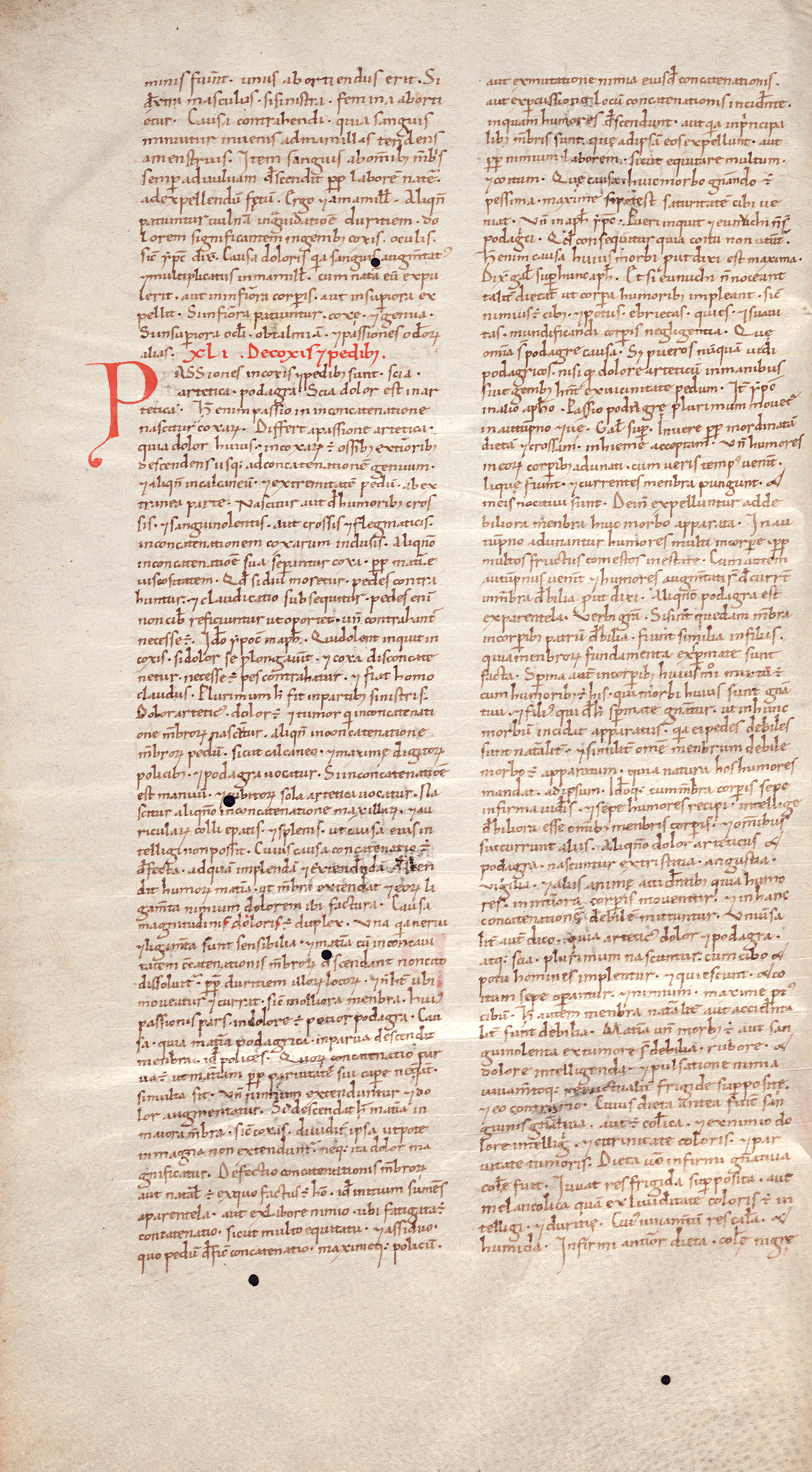
f. 077v

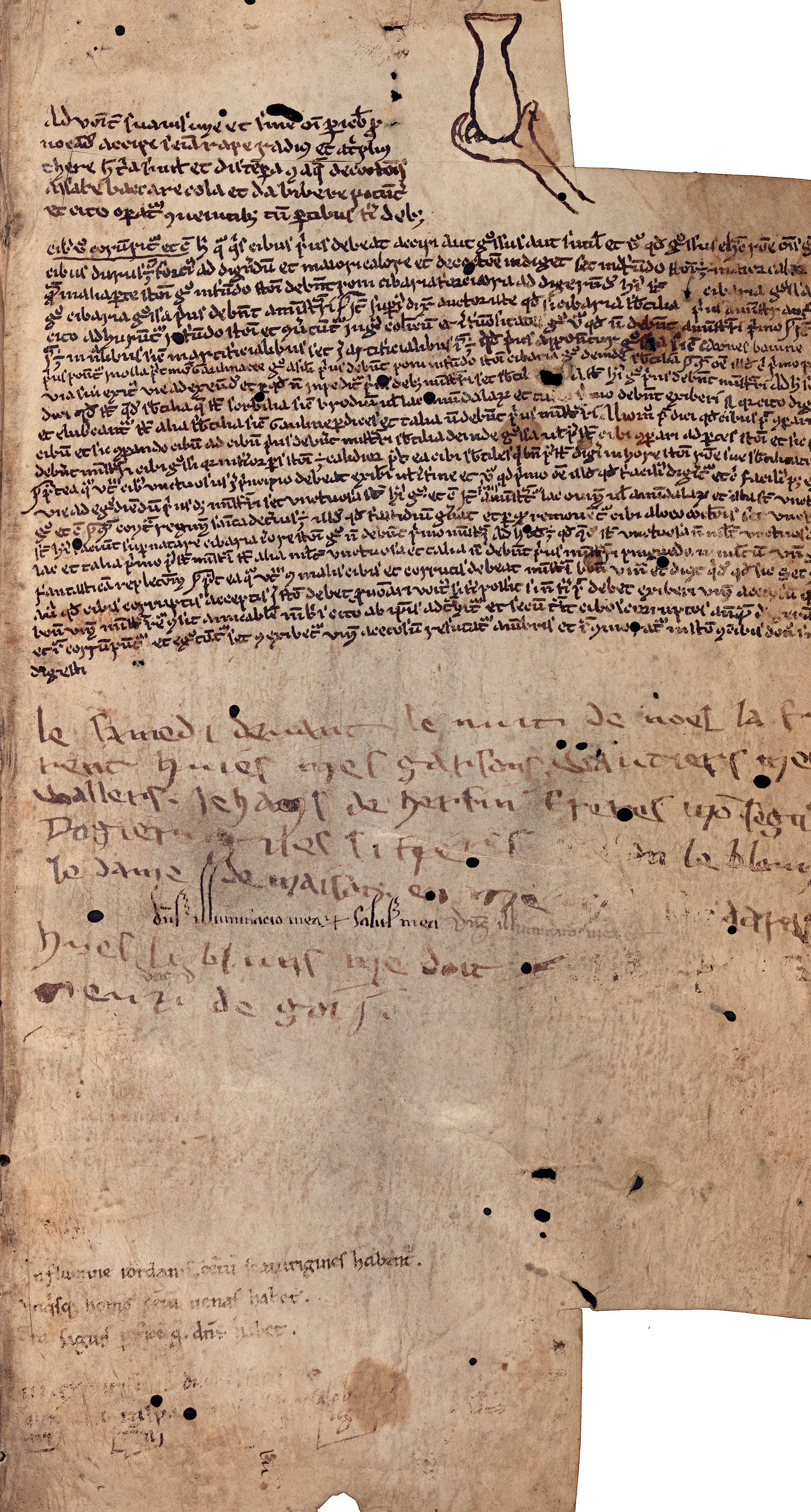
f. 089r

== Editions ==
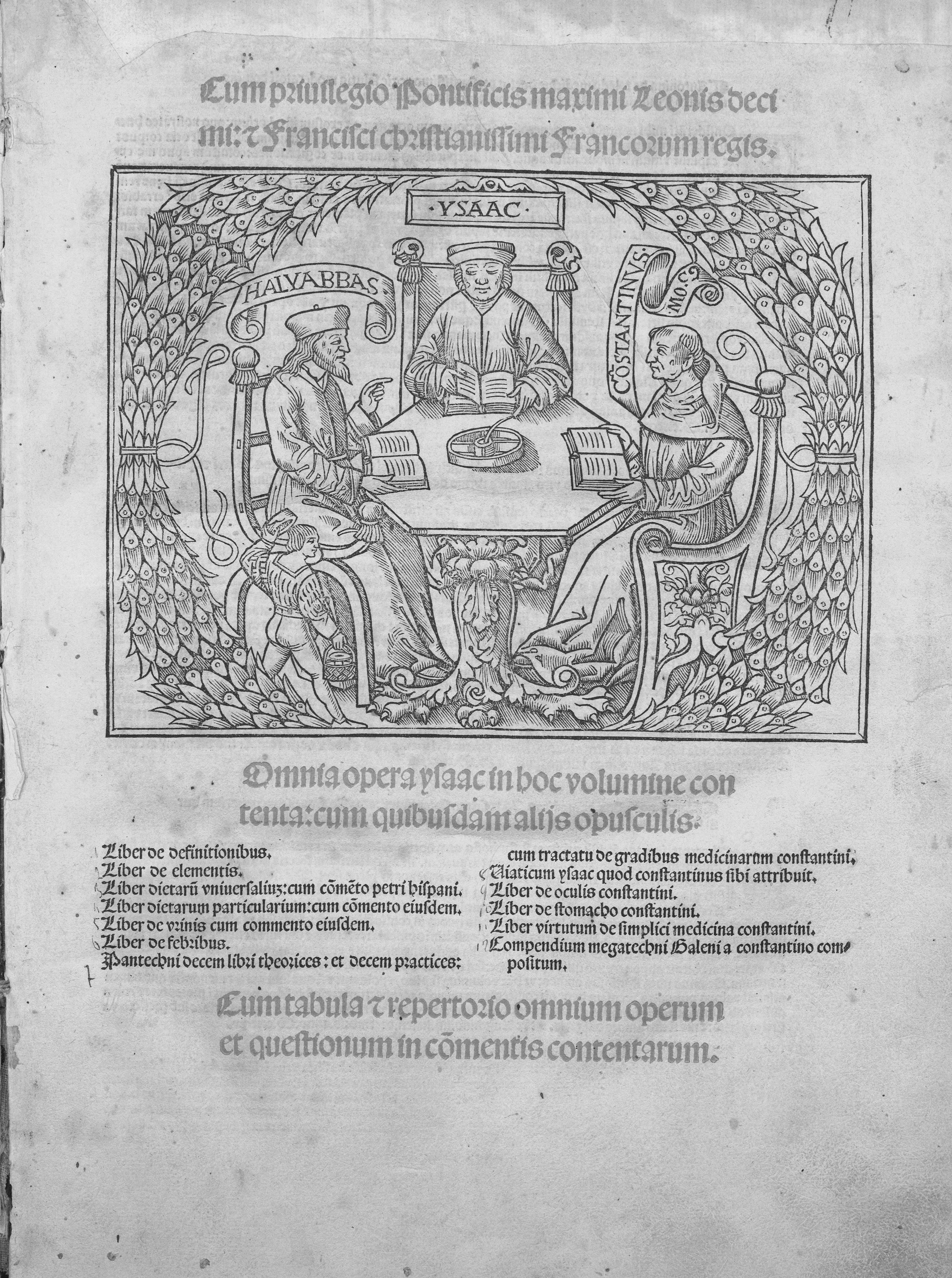
Omnia opera Ysaac

- Constantinus Africanus, De genitalibus membris (= Pantegni, Theorica 3.33-36), in: Monica H. Green, “The De genecia Attributed to Constantine the African,” Speculum 62 (1987), 299-323, at pp. 312-323.
- Eleventh-century manuscript version at the Koninklijke Bibliotheek, National library of the Netherlands. This is the copy made at Monte Cassino under Constantine's supervision. (Pantegni pars prima theorica (lib. I-X), includes only the first part, the theorica, subdivided in 10 chapters - signature KB 73 J 6)
- Theorica Pantegni; the first part of Liber Pantegni as a facsimile and transcription of the Helsinki manuscript, which dates from the 2nd half of the 12th century. National Library of Finland, 2011, http://www.doria.fi/handle/10024/69831.
- Opera omnia ysaac. Ed. Andreas Turinus. Lugduni 1515; Wolfenbüttel Digital Library
- Constantini opera. Apud Henricus Petrus. Basileae 1536/39.

== Literature ==
- Constantine the African and Ali ibn al-Abbas al-Maǧusi: The Pantegni and Related Texts, ed. Charles Burnett and Danielle Jacquart, Studies in Ancient Medicine, vol. 10. Leiden: E. J. Brill, 1994.
- Moritz Steinschneider, "Constantinus Africanus und seine arabischen Quellen," Virchows Archiv 37 (1866), 351-416.
- Charles Singer, "A Legend of Salerno. How Constantine the African Brought the Art of Medicine to the Christians," Johns Hopkins Bulletin 28 (1917), 64-69.
- Hermann Lehmann, "Die Arbeitsweise des Constantinus Afrikanus und des Johannes Afflacius im Verhältnis zueinander," Archeion 12 (1930), 272-281.
