= Constantine the Jew =

Byzantine Christian monk

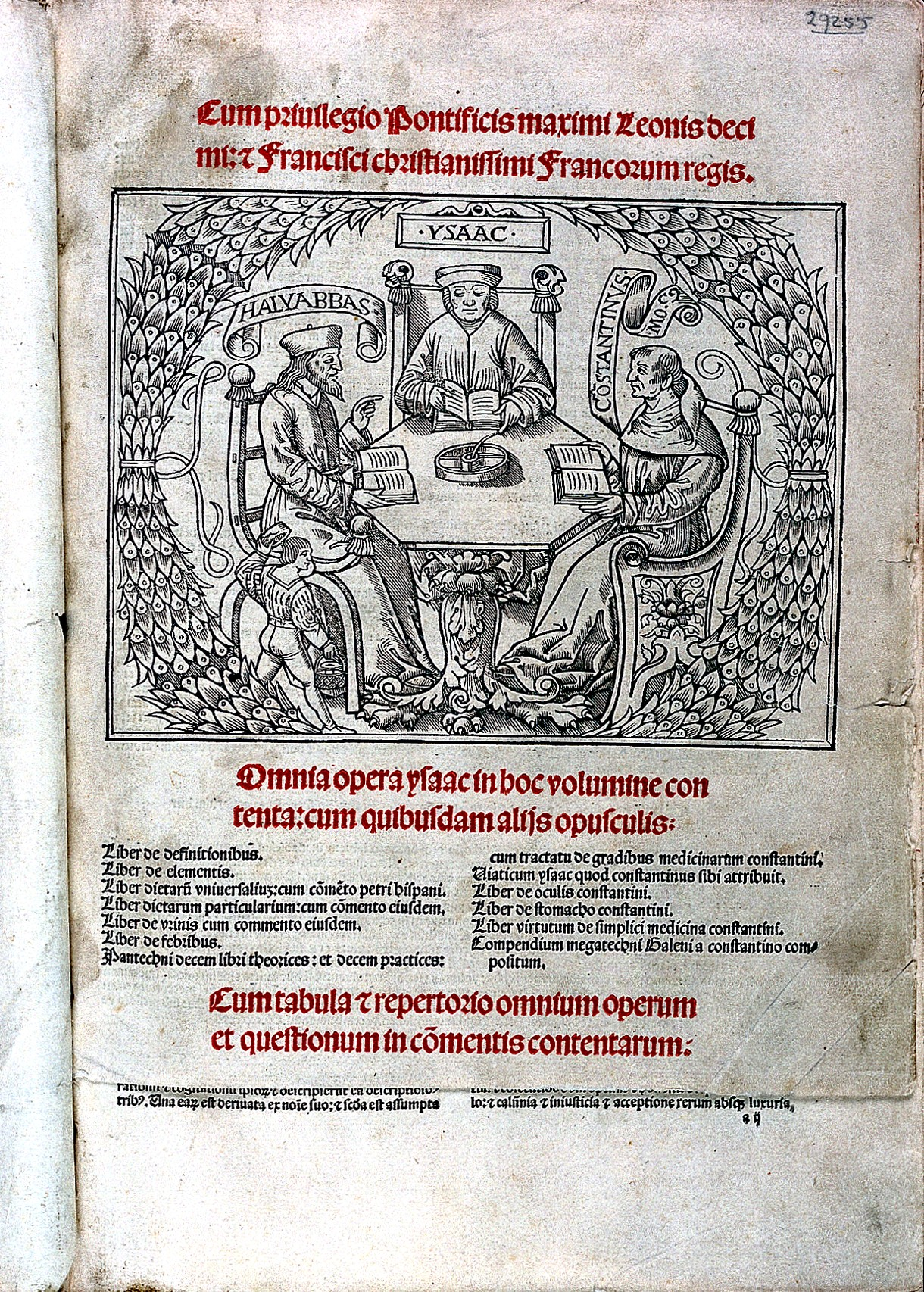
Collected works of Isaac Israeli ben Solomon. The cover shows an illustration of 'Ali ibn al-'Abbas al-Majusi (Haly Abbas), Isaac and Constantine the Jew.

Constantine the Jew (c. 850 – 26 December, after 886) was a Byzantine Christian monk and evangelist venerated as a saint within his monastic milieu and in Constantinople.

Born to a Jewish family in Synada, Constantine excelled at Hebrew and the Old Testament from a young age. He was said to have been converted to Christianity as a youth by the power of the sign of the cross, which he had made in spontaneous imitation of a Christian merchant. His full conversion was gradual. It may be linked to the campaign undertaken by the Emperor Basil I (r. 867–886) to convert the Jews early in his reign. Constantine's family arranged a marriage for him, but on his wedding day he fled to the monastery of Phlouboute, where he was finally baptised.

Constantine, known as "the former Jew" (ό εξ Ιουδαιων, ho ex Iudaion), remained at Phlouboute for twelve years. He was ordained a priest in order to evangelise the Jews of Nicaea. In a vision, Saint Spyridon told him to go to Cyprus, where he acquired a relic of a martyr named Palamon, which he gave to the monastery of Saint Hyakinthos in Nicaea. After Phlouboute, he joined the monastic establishments of Bithynian Olympus, where Jewish relatives tried to have him arrested and sent back as a fugitive. He eventually did settle on Olympus, first at Atroa and later at Balaios. From Olympus he is said to have intervened to reconcile the Emperor Basil I with his son Leo VI, co-emperor since 870.

An anonymous hagiography of Constantine (Acta Sanctorum, Nov. IV, 628–656 and Bibliotheca Hagiographica Graeca 370) was written by a Nicaean monk early in the tenth century during the reign of Leo VI, probably in Constantinople. The author was not an acquaintance of Constantine and he relied on oral traditions for his composition. It survives in a single manuscript. The author portrays Constantine as popular with the Byzantine aristocracy. The miracles he attributes to Constantine's sanctity are unconventional. In one, a seductress faints when Constantine makes the sign of the cross.

Archbishop Anthony of Novgorod records the existence of a church dedicated to Constantine in the Jewish Quarter of Constantinople in the thirteenth century.

== Bibliography ==
- Kazhdan, Alexander (1991). "Constantine the Jew". In Kazhdan, Alexander (ed.). The Oxford Dictionary of Byzantium. Oxford and New York: Oxford University Press. ISBN 0-19-504652-8.
- Starr, Joshua (1970). Jews in the Byzantine Empire, 641–1204. Burt Franklin.
- Falkenhausen, Vera von (2012). "In Search of the Jews in Byzantine Literature". In Robert Bonfil; Oded Irshai; Guy G. Stroumsa; Rina Talgam (eds.). Jews in Byzantium: Dialectics of Minority and Majority Cultures. Brill. pp. 871–892.
- Rotman, Youval (2012). "Converts in Byzantine Italy: Local Representations of Jewish–Christian Rivalry". In Robert Bonfil; Oded Irshai; Guy G. Stroumsa; Rina Talgam (eds.). Jews in Byzantium: Dialectics of Minority and Majority Cultures. Brill. pp. 893–922.
