= Demetrios Nomikos =

Greek painter and goldsmith (1680–1750)

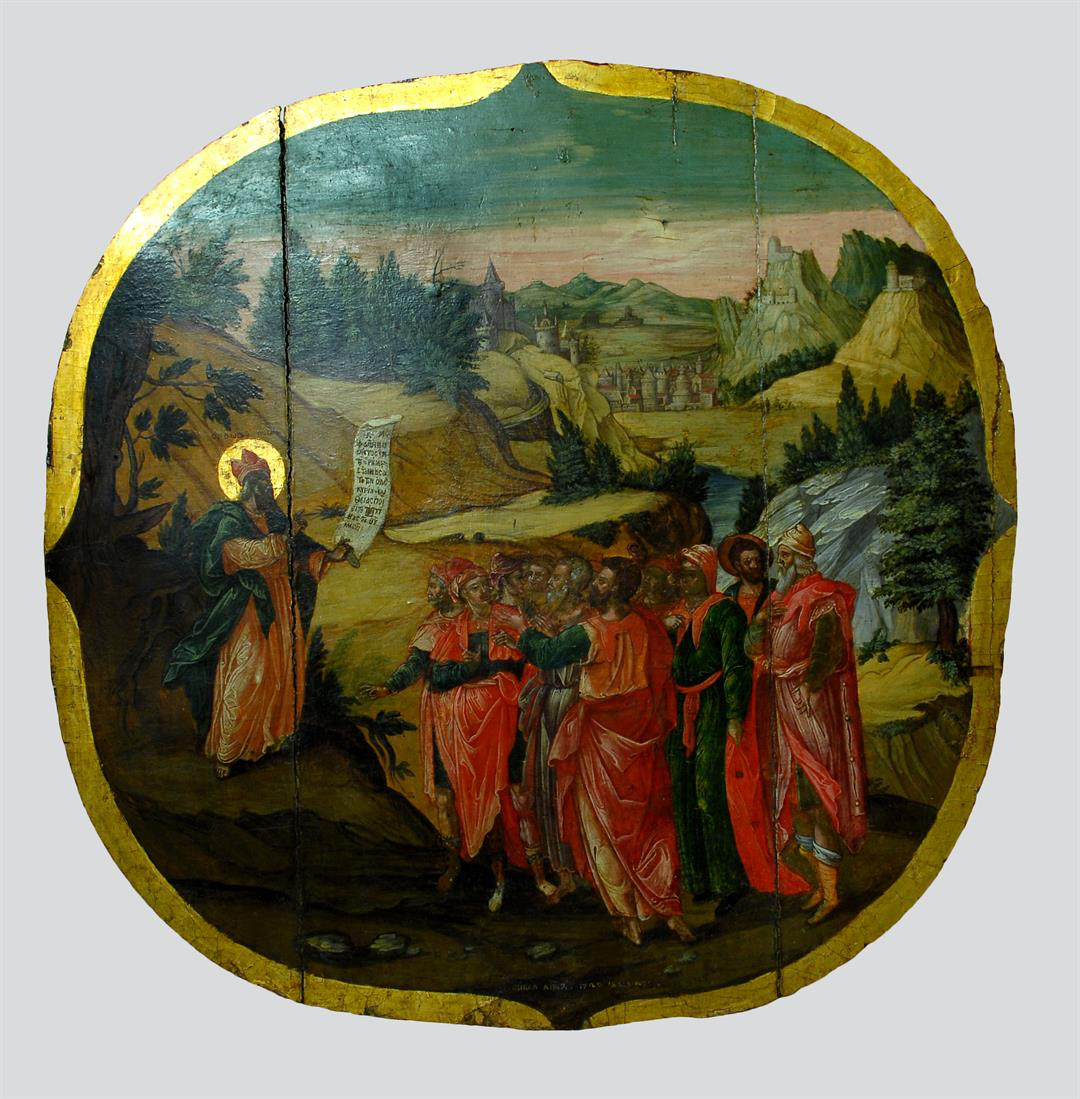
- The Sermon of the Prophet Isaiah
- Born: 1680; Zakynthos, Greece
- Died: 1750 (aged 69–70); Zakynthos, Greece
- Known for: Iconographer; goldsmith
- Movement: Heptanese school

Demetrios Nomikos (Greek: Δημήτριος Νομικός; 1680–1750) was a Greek painter, goldsmith, and priest. He shared the same last name with other famous Greek painters. Georgios Nomikos, Demetrios Nomikos and his brother Nicholas Nomikos. He is one of the early representatives of the Heptanese school of painting. He was active during the Greek Baroque and Rococo. He worked with notable Greek painter Antonios Notaras. Konstantinos Kontarinis, Stylianos Stavrakis and Nikolaos Kallergis were active on the same islands around the same period. Nomikos was a master gilder. According to the Institute of Neohellenic Research, five of his works survived. His most notable works are at the Loverdos Museum.

== History ==
Nomikos was born on the island of Zakynthos. He was a priest. He worked with his brother Nicholas. He eventually became partners with famous painter Antonios Notaras. Historians have archives from 1701-1730. In 1701, he gilded the iconostasis of the church of the Holy Trinity of Gerakari, Zakynthos with his brother Nicholas.

In 1718, he gilded the doors of the church of the Assumption in Machairados, Zakynthos. One year later Demetrios and his brother gilded the iconostasis in the church of Agios Georgios Gerakari, Zakynthos. According to records in 1730, Nomikos entered a partnership with painter and priest Antonios Notaras. Both of the painters were active on the island of Lefkada and elsewhere. Nomikos received sixty percent of the profits.

== Notable works ==
- Epitaphios (liturgical) Seltman Collection, London England

== Bibliography ==
- Hatzidakis, Manolis (1987). Greek painters after the fall (1450-1830) Volume A. Athens, GR: Center for Modern Greek Studies E.I.E.
- Hatzidakis, Manolis & Drakopoulou, Eugenia (1997). Greek painters after the fall (1450-1830) Volume B. Athens, GR: Center for Modern Greek Studies E.I.E.
- Drakopoulou, Eugenia (2010). Greek painters after the fall (1450-1830) Volume C. Athens, GR: Center for Modern Greek Studies E.I.E.
