= Karl Sudhoff =

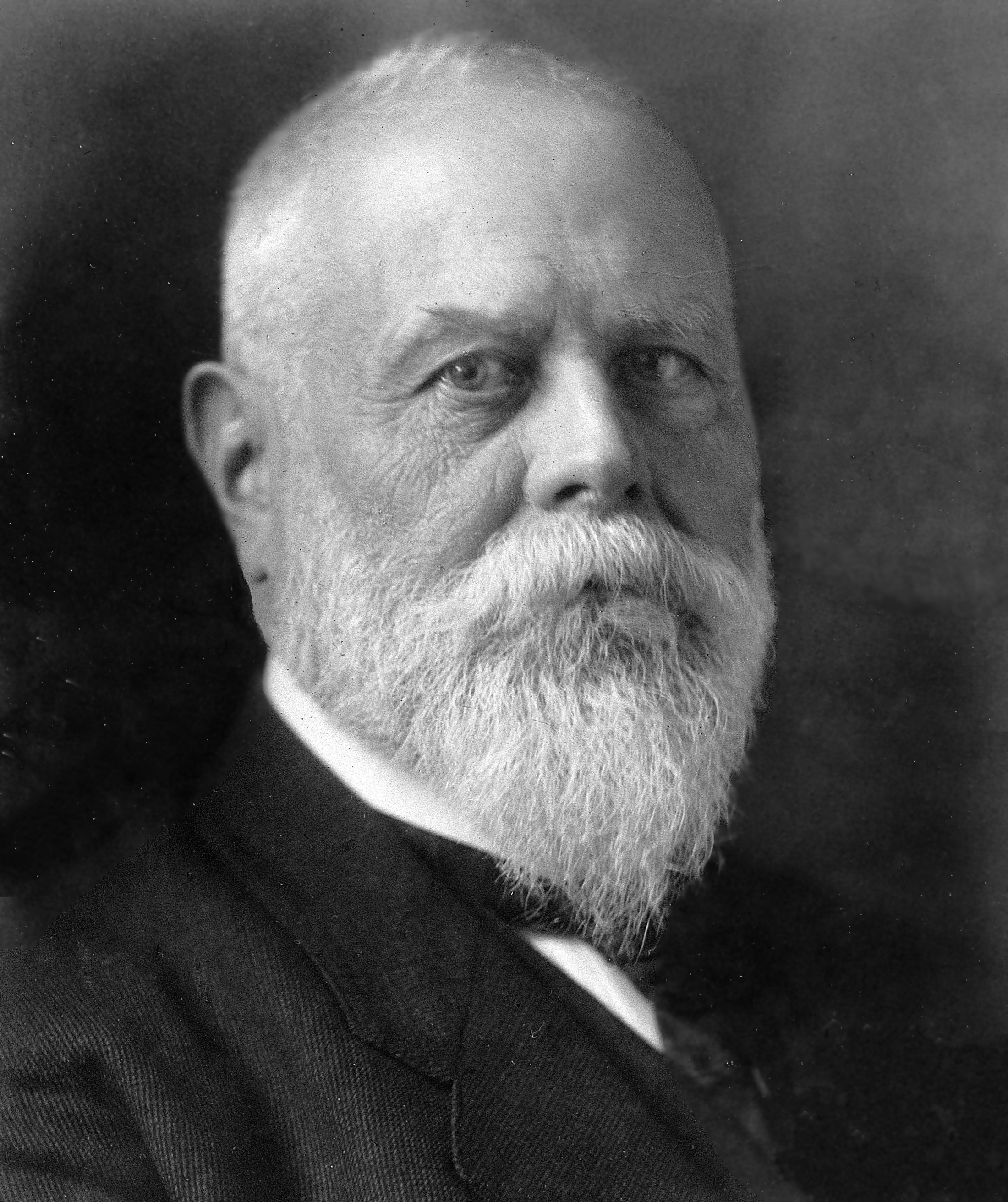
Karl Sudhoff

Karl Sudhoff (26 November 1853, Frankfurt am Main – 8 October 1938, Salzwedel) was a German historian of medicine, who founded the first institute for the history of medicine in the world.

Sudhoff taught for years at the University of Leipzig, where he founded the Institute for the History of Medicine (Institut für Geschichte der Medizin) and exercised strong control over the direction of German medical history. He also established the journal Archiv für Geschichte der Medizin, later renamed Sudhoffs Archiv, and the monograph series Studien zur Geschichte der Medizin. As a researcher, he had a reputation for strength in archival research, and made a particular contribution to the revival of interest in Paracelsus and Constantine the African. He retired in 1925, and was succeeded in his position at Leipzig by Henry E. Sigerist.

In 1933 Sudhoff joined the Nazi Party (NSDAP), to the great dismay of many of his peers, maintaining his membership for the rest of his life. After Sigerist's 1932 departure for Johns Hopkins University, Sudhoff again headed the Institute at Leipzig before turning the position over to Walter von Brunn in November 1934. He died in Salzwedel on October 8, 1938.
