= Ibn al-Jazzar =

Ifriqiyan physician (895–979)

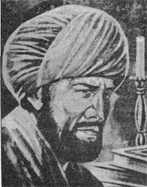
- Born: 895; Kairouan, now Kairouan Governorate, Tunisia
- Died: 979 (aged 84); Kairouan, now Kairouan Governorate, Tunisia
- Occupations: Physician; Islamic medicine
- Writing career
- Notable works: Zād al-Musāfir wa Quwwat al-Hādhir زاد المسافر وقوت الحاضر (Viaticum)

Abū Jaʿfar Aḥmad ibn Ibrāhīm ibn Abī Khālid ibn al-Jazzār al-Qayrawani (895–979) (Arabic: أبو جعفر أحمد بن أبي خالد بن الجزار القيرواني), was a 10th-century Arab Muslim physician who became famous for his writings on Islamic medicine. He was born in Qayrawan in Tunisia. He was known in Europe by the Latinized name Algizar.

== Biography ==
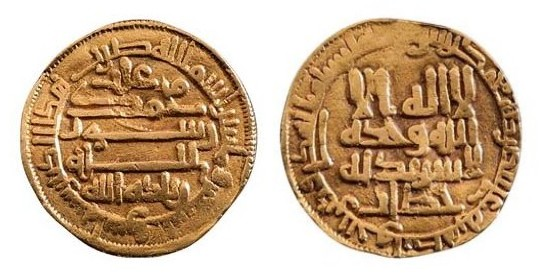
Aghlabid dinar dated to 905 CE

Andalusi physician ibn Juljul only knew Ibn al-Jazzar's biography from his student ibn Bariq, who went to Qayrawan to learn medicine. The writers of tabaqat "classes of famous men" generally considered writing only for fuquhā, their benefactors, and wali. Information on ibn al-Jazzar is controversial and possibly incomplete second-hand information.

Al-Jazzar was born in Qayrawan around 895 and died around 979. He lived about 84 years. He was married and had no children. He had learned the Quran at kuttab in his youth, and Arabic grammar, theology, fiqh, and history at the Great Mosque of Kairouan. He had learned medicine from his father and uncle, both physicians, and from Ishaq Ibn Suleiman, a physician in Qayrawan.

The existence of a hospital in Kairouan has not been proven. Teaching is provided by the doctors themselves at home. This is the case of Ibn al-Jazzar. In the conclusion of his Zād al-musāfir wa-qūt al-ḥāḍir, he said himself that he would be available at home for his students at the end of their daily consultation.

Teaching was oral. Paper was not widely used in the ninth century, and scrolls were rare and expensive. Ibn al-Jazzar had a library of 25 quintals, but this figure seems exaggerated. According to some, the quintal amounted to 50 kg and 25 kg, respectively. These books were about medicine and other disciplines.

Ibn al-Jazzar was calm and quiet. He did not attend funerals or weddings or participate in festivities. He had great respect for himself. He avoided compromises and did not attend the court and regime members. This may explain why when he treated the son of al-Qadi al-Nu'man, he refused to receive a costume of 300 mithkals as a gift. The Qadi did not realize his desire to visit al-Andalus; the relationship between the two governments of the Fatimid Caliphate in the newly-founded city of Mahdia and the Umayyad state of Córdoba was tense. Out of respect for the Amir, he did not go on hajj; al-Nu'man was Isma'ili, and for ceremonial purposes and policies, he created barriers to pilgrims and forced them to pass through Mahdia and pay a toll.

He went every Friday to Mahdia to visit the uncle of al-Mu'izz li-Din Allah, his friend. During the heat of the summer, he went to Monastir and lived in a ribat with border soldiers. Ibn al-Jazzar prepared medicines and had an assistant to serve them who stood in the vestibule of his house and collected the consultation fees. Upon his death, ibn al-Jazzar left 24,000 gold dinars. The Aghlabid dinar weighed 4.20 grams.

== The Viaticum ==
Ibn al-Jazzar wrote a number of books. They deal with grammar, history, jurisprudence, prosody, etc. Many of these books, quoted by different authors, are lost. The most important book of ibn al-Jazzar is Zād al-Musāfir (The Viaticum). Translated into Latin, Greek and Hebrew, it has been copied, recopied, and printed in France and Italy since the sixteenth century. It was adopted and popularized in Europe as a book for a classical education in medicine. This book is a compilation of the Canon of Avicenna, a mixture of medicine and philosophy.

It is a medicine handbook from head to toe, designed for clinical teaching. With neither anatomy nor philosophy. There are lessons written after the course, as noted by the author in the conclusion of his book. This can be seen by the repetitions found in them. The author names the disease, lists the known symptoms, gives the treatment and sometimes indicates the prognosis. He often cited in reference the names of foreign authors, as if to give importance to his subject or for intellectual integrity to justify the loans.

In his History of Arab medicine in Tunisia for ten centuries, Ahmed Ben Miled writes:

As al-Razi Muhammad ibn Zakariya al-Razi, precedes him by a few decades, Ibn Al Jazzar has adopted in the Viaticum the same style as “El Haoui”, (The Continent: who voluntarily abstain from carnal pleasures) of al-Razi but more elaborate and more concise. One can wonder if he had not had this book in his hands very early on. This is unlikely, because in The Viaticum he does not separate measles from smallpox, which was the innovation of al-Razi. And among the physicians whom he often refers such Galen, Hippocrates, Dioscorides, Refus, Tridon, Fergorius, Aristotle and Ibn Suleiman Isaac Israeli ben Solomon, he does not mention al-Razi.

Books by these authors must have existed in Tunisia at that time. Tunisia was in constant contact with Rome, Athens and Byzantium because of the sheer size of its economy and its position in the midst of the Mediterranean Sea.

Constantine the African was the translator of Ibn Al Jazzar's books.

== Books ==
Among his titles are,

- Zād al-musāfir wa-qūt al-ḥāḍir
- al-Iʿtimād fī l-adwiya al-mufrada
- al-Bughya fī l-adwiya al-murakkaba
- Ṭibb al-fuqarāʾ wa-l-masākīn
- Ṭibb al-mashāyikh
- Kitāb al-khawwāṣṣ

His major work was Zād al-musāfir.

He had some books on geriatric medicine and health of elderly (Kitāb Ṭibb al-Mashāyikh or Ṭibb al-Mashāyikh wa-ḥifẓ ṣiḥḥatihim), a book on sleep disorders, one on 'forgetfulness and how to strengthen memory' (Kitāb al-Nisyān wa-Ṭuruq Taqwiyat al-Dhākira), and another on causes of mortality (Risāla fī Asbāb al-Wafāh). He had other books on pediatrics, fevers, sexual disorders, medicine of the poor, therapeutics, viaticum, coryza, stomach disorders, leprosy, separate drugs, compound drugs, and in other areas of science (e.g., history, animals and literature).

== See also ==
- List of Arab scientists and scholars

== Bibliography ==
- Ahmed Ben Miled, Ibn Al Jazzar. Constantin l'Africain, éd. Salambô, Tunis, 1987
- Ahmed Ben Miled, Histoire de la médecine arabe en Tunisie, éd. Dar al-Gharb al-Islami, Beyrouth, 1999
- Ahmed Ben Miled, Ibn Al Jazzar. Médecin à Kairouan, éd. Al Maktaba Al Tounisia, Tunis, 1936
- Vanzan, Anna (1 January 2012). "The Paediatric Treatise of a Fatimid Physician: Ibn al-Jazzar's Kitab Siyasat al-Sibyan". Journal of Shi'a Islamic Studies. 5 (2): 173–186. doi:10.1353/isl.2012.0000. S2CID 143494930.
