= Walter von Brunn =

German surgeon and historian of medicine

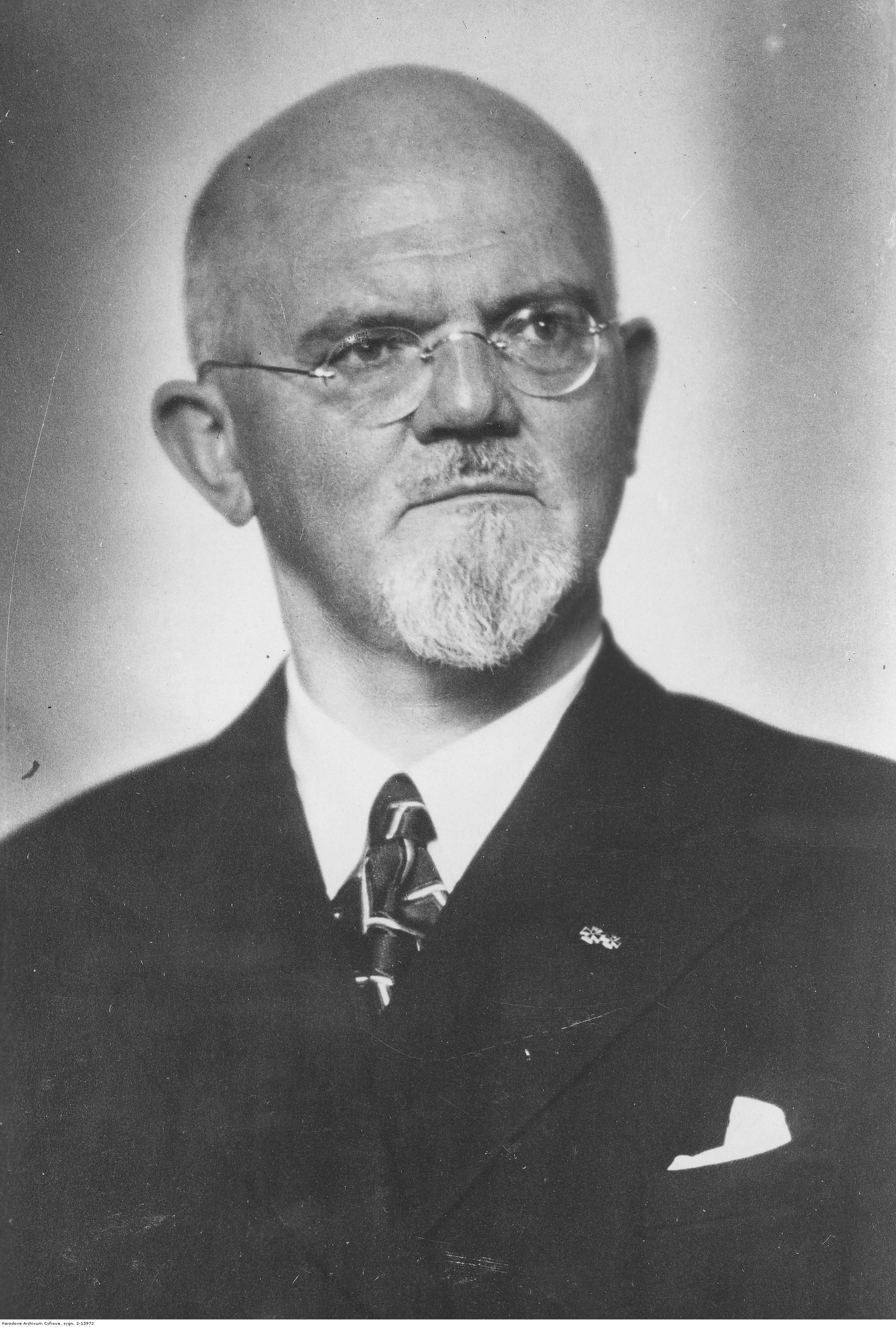
Image of Walter von Brunn

Walter Albert Ferdinand Brunn (2 September 1876, in Göttingen – 21 December 1952, in Leipzig) was a German surgeon and historian of medicine.

He studied medicine at the universities of Göttingen and Rostock, where he was a student of Carl Garré. From 1900 to 1905 he served as a surgical assistant in the university clinics at Berlin and Marburg, and afterwards opened a private surgical practice in Rostock. As a hospital physician during World War I, he lost an arm as the result of a septic infection, thus ending his career as a surgeon.

In 1919 he obtained his habilitation with a thesis on the medieval surgeon Guy de Chauliac, and in 1924 became an associate professor at the University of Rostock. From 1934 to 1950 he was a professor of the history of medicine at the University of Leipzig.

From 1934 to 1950 he was director of the Karl Sudhoff-Institut für Geschichte der Medizin und der Naturwissenschaften (Karl Sudhoff Institute for the History of Medicine and Natural Sciences) at Leipzig. From 1947 to 1951 he was vice-president of the Deutsche Akademie der Naturforscher Leopoldina.

== Selected works ==
- Von den Gilden der Barbiere und Chirurgen in den Hansestädten, 1921 – On the guilds of barbers and surgeons in the Hanseatic towns.
- Kurze Geschichte der Chirurgie, 1928 – Brief history of surgery.
- Paracelsus und seine Schwindsuchtlehre, 1941 – Paracelsus and tuberculosis teaching.
- Medizinische Zeitschriften im neunzehnten Jahrhundert (posthumous, 1963) – Medical journals in the nineteenth century.
