= Ishaq Ibn Imran =

Ishaq Ibn Imran (died c. 905) was an Arab physician working in Kairouan, which at the time was the capital of Tunisia. His treatise on melancholy, written c. 900, was translated into Latin by Constantine the African in the eleventh century.
