= Stephen of Pisa =

Stephen of Pisa (also Stephen of Antioch, Stephen the Philosopher) was an Italian translator from Arabic active in Antioch and Southern Italy in the first part of the twelfth century.

He was responsible for the translation of works of Islamic science, in particular medical works of Hali Abbas (the al-Kitab al-Maliki, by Ali Abbas al-Majusi), translated around 1127 into Latin as Liber regalis dispositionis. This was the first full translation, the earlier translation by Constantine the African as the Pantegni being partial.

It is believed that he was also a translator at about the same time of Ptolemy's Almagest, for a manuscript now in Dresden, and the author or translator of the Liber Mamonis, a discussion of the Ptolemaic cosmological system using Arabic knowledge, calling for it to replace the ideas of Macrobius then current in the Latin world.

Initially from Pisa, he studied in Salerno.

== See also ==
- Latin translations of the 12th century
