= The Complete Book of the Medical Art =

Medical Book written by Iranian physician, 'Ali ibn al-'Abbas al-Majusi

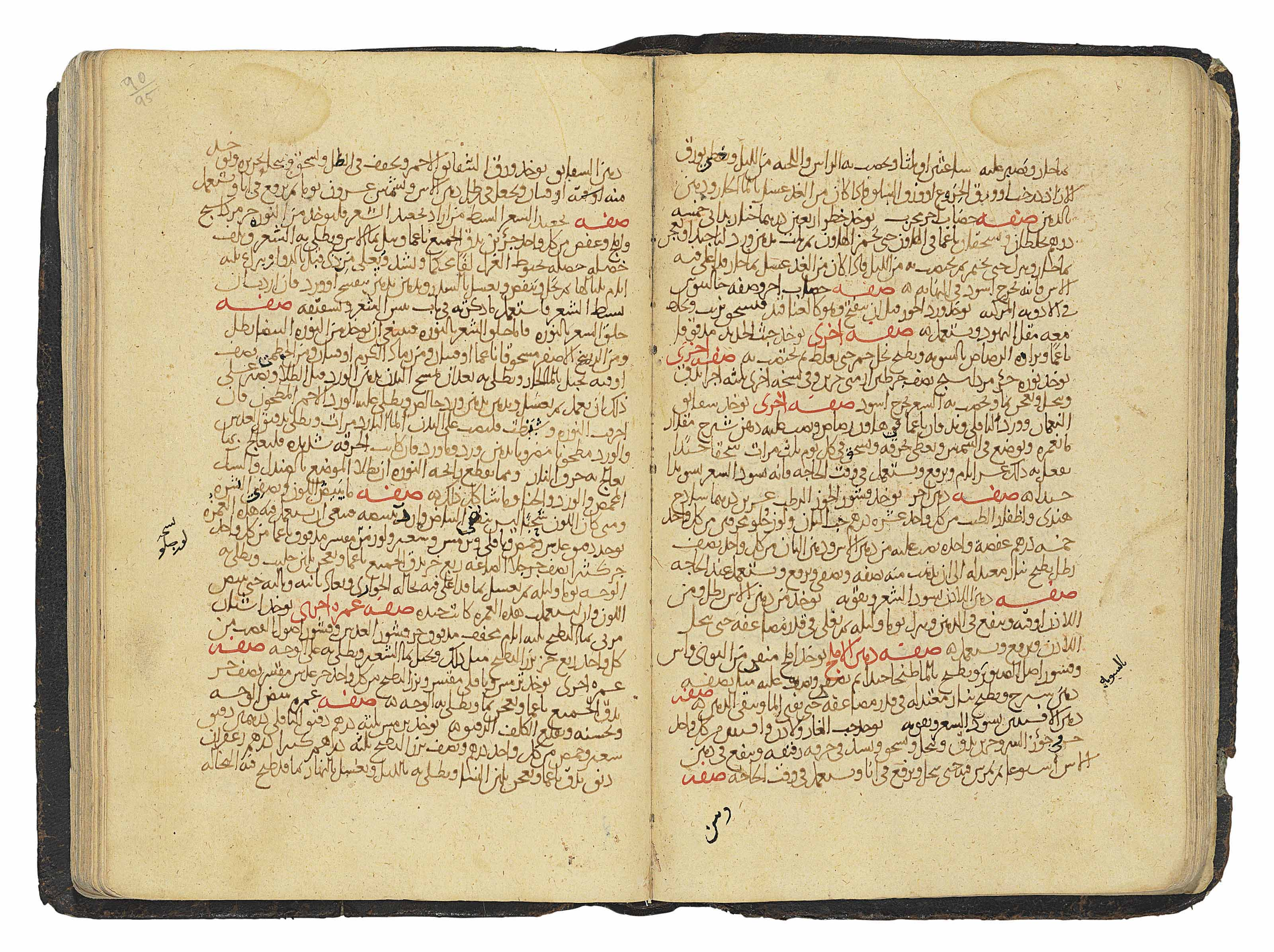
Manuscript of al-Majusi's Kitāb Kamil al-Sana'ah al-Tibbiyyah, copy created in Iran, dated January–February 1194.

The Complete Book of the Medical Art (Arabic: كامل الصناعة الطبية, Kitāb Kāmil al-Ṣināʻa al-Ṭibbīya), also known as The Royal Book (Arabic: الكتاب الملكي, Al-Kitāb al-Malakī), was written by Iranian physician 'Ali ibn al-'Abbas al-Majusi during the 10th century. He dedicated the book to king 'Adud al-Dawla, whom he was serving at the time. This book was considered one of the most necessary texts for medical students of that era, and the importance of his book was mentioned several times in views of different medicine historians, such as Lucien Leclerc and Arturo Castiglioni.

This book consists of 20 treatises. The first 10 treatise describe mostly the theories of medicine, while the second 10 treatise are focused on the practice of medicine. The 9th treatise in the second part is focused on surgery, and consists of 110 different surgical subjects, including techniques of treating aneurysm, excising cysts and tumors and treating hernias. This part was at the center of attention of western and eastern researchers.

Al-Majūsī is well known for his accurate description of pleurisy, circulatory system, and the importance of diet and physical exercise in maintaining health. In the introduction of his book, Al-Majūsī criticizes many of Greek and Persian physicians and their books. For example, in review of Hippocrates and his works, he writes: "Hippocrates didn't describe most of the illnesses as comprehensive as he should, making them difficult to understand ...", although he also mentions the positive aspects of these books as well.

The book was partially translated to Latin in 1089 and then was widely circulated in Europe.

== See also ==
- Liber pantegni
- List of most expensive books and manuscripts
