= Lucien Leclerc =

French military doctor, translator and historian

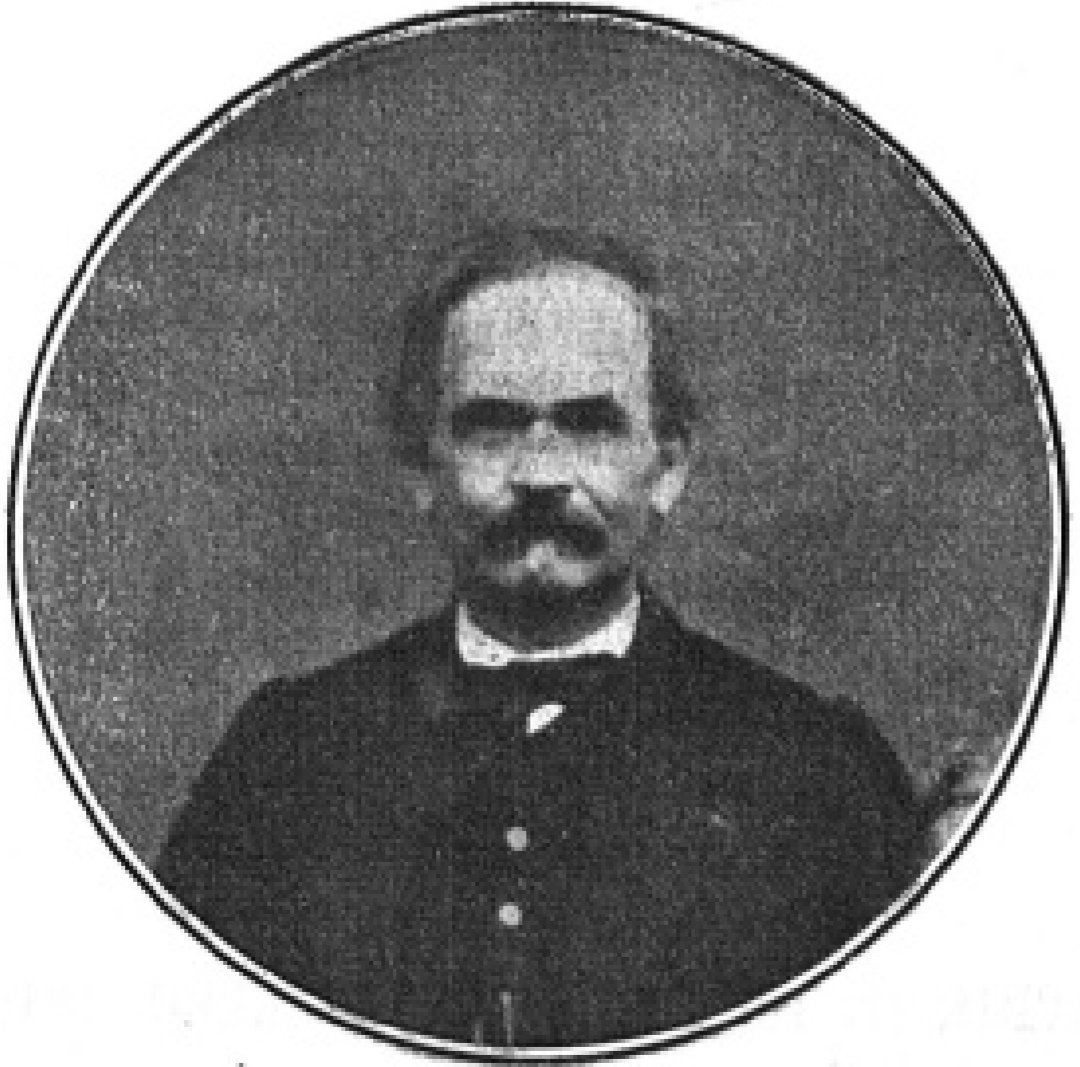
Portrait of Lucien Leclerc, 1914

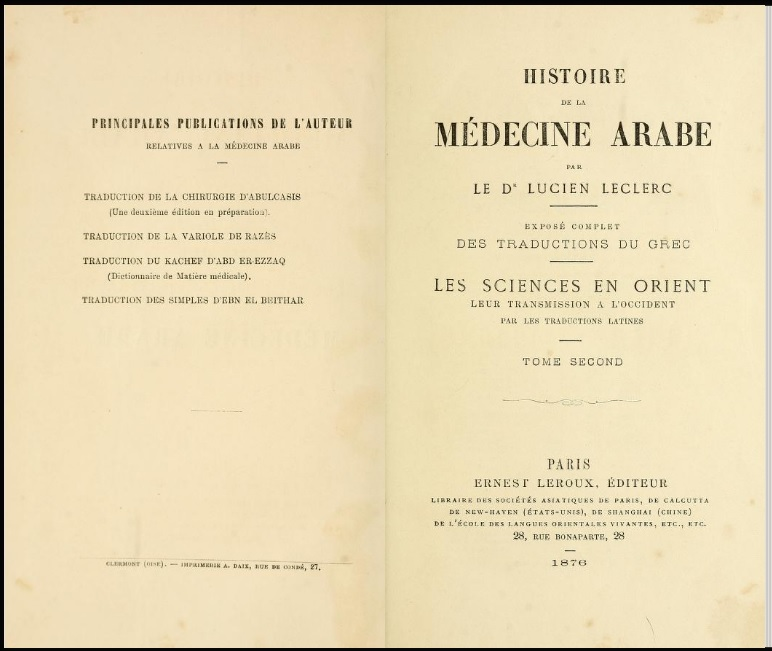
Lucien Leclerc's Histoire de la médecine arabe, 1876

Nicholas Lucien Leclerc (1816 in Ville-sur-Illon – 1893) was a French military doctor, translator, and influential early western historian of medicine in the medieval Islamic world. He was an assistant military surgeon in Algeria from 1840–44. His Histoire de la médecine arabe (Paris, 1876) was one of the first major histories of Arabic medicine, but has subsequently been superseded in many areas.
