= 'Ali ibn al-'Abbas al-Majusi =

10th century Persian physician and psychologist

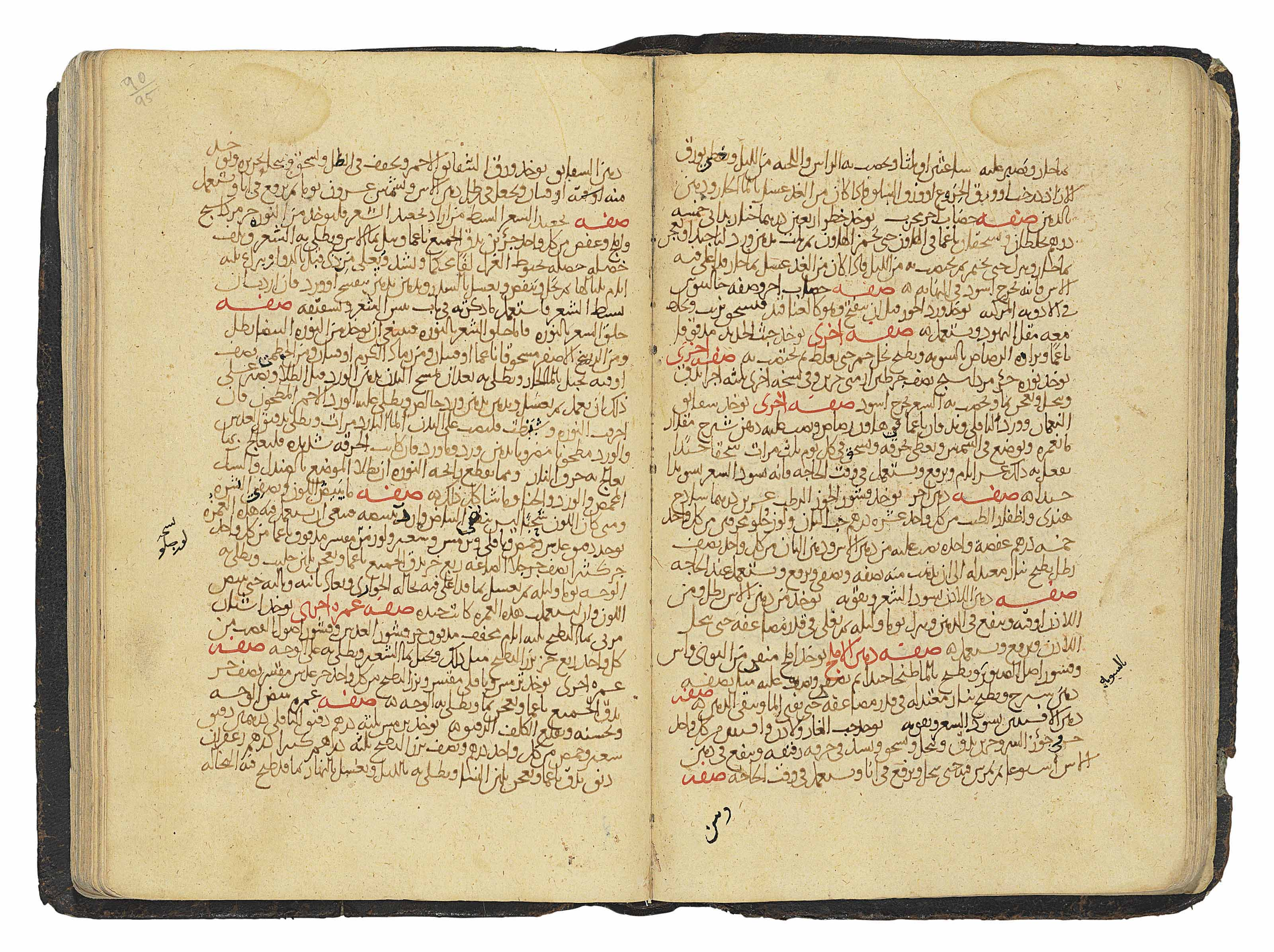
Manuscript of al-Majusi's Kamil al-Sana'ah al-Tibbiyyah, copy created in Iran, dated January–February 1194.

'Ali ibn al-'Abbas al-Majusi (Persian: علی بن عباس مجوسی; died between 982 and 994), also known as Masoudi, or Latinized as Haly Abbas, was a Persian physician and psychologist from the Islamic Golden Age, most famous for the Kitab al-Maliki or Complete Book of the Medical Art, his textbook on medicine and psychology.

== Biography ==
He was born in Ahvaz, southwestern Persia, to a Persian family and studied under Shaikh Abu Maher Musa ibn Sayyār. He was considered one of the three greatest physicians of the Eastern Caliphate of his time, and became physician to Emir 'Adud al-Daula Fana Khusraw of the Buwayhid dynasty, who ruled from 949 CE to 983 CE. The Emir was a great patron of medicine, and founded a hospital at Shiraz in Persia, and in 981 the Al-Adudi Hospital in Baghdad, where al-Majusi worked. His ancestors were Zoroastrian (whence the nisba "al-Majusi"), but he himself was a Muslim. The name of his father was Abbas, and according to Iranica, is not the kind of name typically taken by a neophyte, a fact which suggests that conversion to Islam took place in the generation of his grandparents, if not earlier. He himself seems to have been lacking in Muslim zeal, since no mention is made of the prophet Moḥammad in his introductory remarks, while his argument for the excellence of medicine is based entirely on pragmatic reasoning without recourse to the Quran or the Sunna. Moreover, by calling himself "Ali b. Abbas Majusi", the author intentionally calls attention to his Zoroastrian background.

== The Complete Art of Medicine ==
Al-Majusi is best known for his Kitāb Kāmil aṣ-Ṣināʿa aṭ-Ṭibbiyya (كتاب كامل الصناعة الطبية "Complete Book of the Medical Art"), later called The Complete Art of Medicine, which he completed circa 980. He dedicated the work to the Emir, and it became known as the Kitāb al-Malaki (كتاب الملكي, "Royal Book", or in Latin Liber Regalis or Regalis Dispositio). The book is a more systematic and concise encyclopedia than Razi's Hawi, and more practical than Avicenna's The Canon of Medicine, by which it was superseded.

The Maliki is divided into 20 discourses, of which the first ten deal with theory and the second ten with the practice of medicine. Some examples of topics covered are dietetics and materia medica, a rudimentary conception of the capillary system, interesting clinical observations, and proof of the motions of the womb during parturition (for example, the child does not come out, but is pushed out).

In Europe a partial Latin translation was adapted as the Liber Pantegni by Constantinus Africanus (c. 1087), which became a founding text of the Schola Medica Salernitana in Salerno. A complete and much better translation was made in 1127 by Stephen of Antioch, and this was printed in Venice in 1492 and 1523. Haly's book of medicine is cited in Chaucer's Canterbury Tales.

=== Medical ethics and research methodology ===
The work emphasized the need for a healthy relationship between doctors and patients, and the importance of medical ethics. It also provided details on a scientific methodology that is similar to modern biomedical research.

=== Neuroscience and psychology ===
Neuroscience and psychology were discussed in The Complete Art of Medicine. He described the neuroanatomy, neurobiology and neurophysiology of the brain and first discussed various mental disorders, including sleeping sickness, memory loss, hypochondriasis, coma, hot and cold meningitis, vertigo epilepsy, love sickness, and hemiplegia. He placed more emphasis on preserving health through diet and natural healing than he did on medication or drugs, which he considered a last resort.

=== Psychophysiology and psychosomatic medicine ===
Ali ibn Abbas al-Majusi was a pioneer in psychophysiology and psychosomatic medicine. He described how the physiological and psychological aspects of a patient can have an effect on one another in his Complete Book of the Medical Art. He found a correlation between patients who were physically and mentally healthy and those who were physically and mentally unhealthy, and concluded that "joy and contentment can bring a better living status to many who would otherwise be sick and miserable due to unnecessary sadness, fear, worry and anxiety."

== See also ==
- List of Iranian scientists
- Islamic medicine

== Sources ==
- Lutz Richter-Bernburg, "‘Ali b. ‘Abbas Majusi", in Encyclopædia Iranica, ed. Ehsan Yarshater, 6+ vols. (London: Routledge & Kegan Paul and Costa Mesa: Mazda, 1983 to present), vol. 1, pp. 837–8
- Manfred Ullmann, Die Medizin im Islam, Handbuch der Orientalistik, Abteilung I, Erg?nzungsband vi, Abschnitt 1 (Leiden: E.J. Brill, 1970), pp. 140–146
- Fuat Sezgin, Medizin-Pharmazie-Zoologie-Tierheilkunde bis ca 430 H., Geschichte des arabischen Schrifttums, Band 3 (Leiden: E.J. Brill, 1970), pp. 320–322
- Manfred Ullmann, Islamic Medicine (Edinburgh: Edinburgh University Press, 1978, reprinted 1997), pp. 55–85.
- Wustenfeld: Geschichte der arabischen Aerzte (59, 1840).
- Edward G. Browne, Islamic Medicine, 2002, p. 53-54, ISBN 81-87570-19-9
- Charles S. F. Burnett, Danielle Jacquart (eds.), Constantine the African and ʻAlī Ibn Al-ʻAbbās Al-Magūsī: The Pantegni and Related Texts. Leiden: Brill, 1995. ISBN 90-04-10014-8
- Shoja MM, Tubbs RS. The history of anatomy in Persia. J Anat 2007; 210:359–378.
