= Szigetszentmiklós District =

Szigetszentmiklós District Szigetszentmiklósi járás
- Districts of Hungary
- Coat of arms

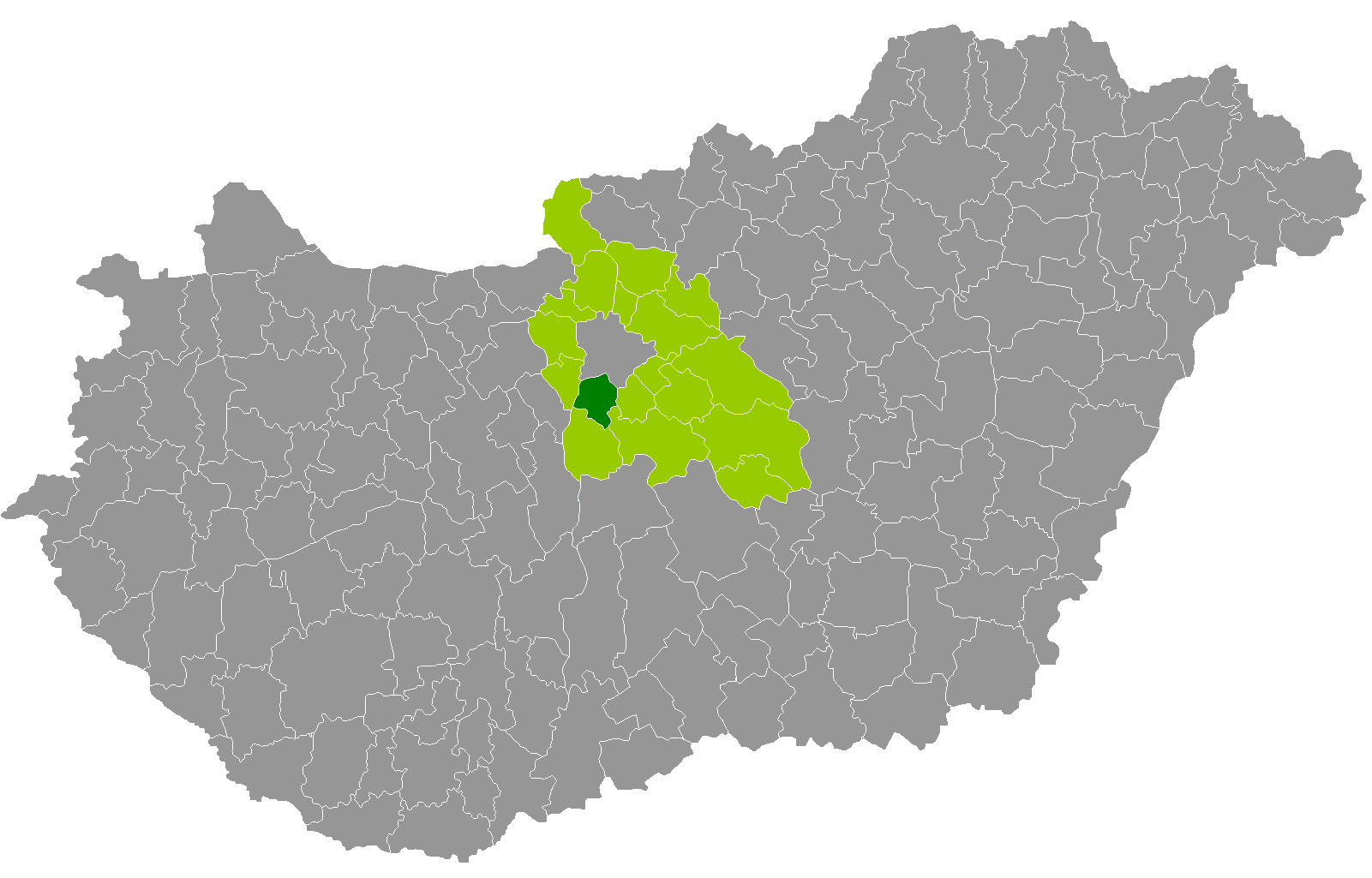
- Szigetszentmiklós District within Hungary and Pest County.
- Coordinates: 47.34°N 19.03°E
- Country: Hungary
- County: Pest
- District seat: Szigetszentmiklós

Area
  - Total: 211.28 km^{2} (81.58 sq mi)
  - Rank: 13th in Pest

Population (2011 census)
  - Total: 110,448
  - Rank: 3rd in Pest
  - Density: 523/km^{2} (1,350/sq mi)

Szigetszentmiklós (Hungarian: Szigetszentmiklósi járás) is a district in south-western part of Pest County. Szigetszentmiklós is also the name of the town where the district seat is found. The district is located in the Central Hungary Statistical Region.

== Geography ==
Szigetszentmiklós District borders with Budapest to the north, Gyál District and Dabas District to the east, Ráckeve District to the south, Érd District to the west. The number of the inhabited places in Szigetszentmiklós District is 9.

== Municipalities ==
The district has 6 towns, 1 large village and 2 villages. (ordered by population, as of 1 January 2013)

- Délegyháza (3,559)
- **Dunaharaszti** (20,396)
- **Dunavarsány** (7,416)
- **Halásztelek** (9,183)
- Majosháza (1,519)
- **Szigethalom** (17,035)
- **Szigetszentmiklós** (34,714) – district seat
- Taksony (6,105)
- **Tököl** (10,106)

The bolded municipalities are cities, italics municipality is large village.

== Demographics ==
Religion in Szigetszentmiklós District (2011 census)
1. Catholic Church (27.6%)
2. Greek Catholicism (1.50%)
3. Calvinism (11.2%)
4. Lutheranism (0.90%)
5. Orthodoxy (0.20%)
6. Other religions (2.40%)
7. Non-religious (22.0%)
8. Atheists (2.00%)
9. Undeclared (32.2%)

In 2011, it had a population of 110,448 and the population density was 523/km².

Year	County population	Change
2011	110,448	n/a

=== Ethnicity ===
Besides the Hungarian majority, the main minorities are the German (approx. 3,700), Roma (1,300), Slovak (1,100), Romanian (550), Croat (350), Bulgarian (250), Serb and Russian (200), Slovak (100).

Total population (2011 census): 110,448
Ethnic groups (2011 census): Identified themselves: 100,804 persons:

- Hungarians: 92,788 (92.05%)
- Germans: 3,708 (3.68%)
- Gypsies: 1,270 (1.26%)
- Others and indefinable: 3,038 (3.01%)

Approx. 9,500 persons in Szigetszentmiklós District did not declare their ethnic group at the 2011 census.

=== Religion ===
Religious adherence in the county according to 2011 census:

- Catholic – 32,188 (Roman Catholic – 30,519; Greek Catholic – 1,665);
- Reformed – 12,343;
- Evangelical – 995;
- Orthodox – 188;
- other religions – 2,722;
- Non-religious – 24,274;
- Atheism – 2,206;
- Undeclared – 35,532.

== Gallery ==
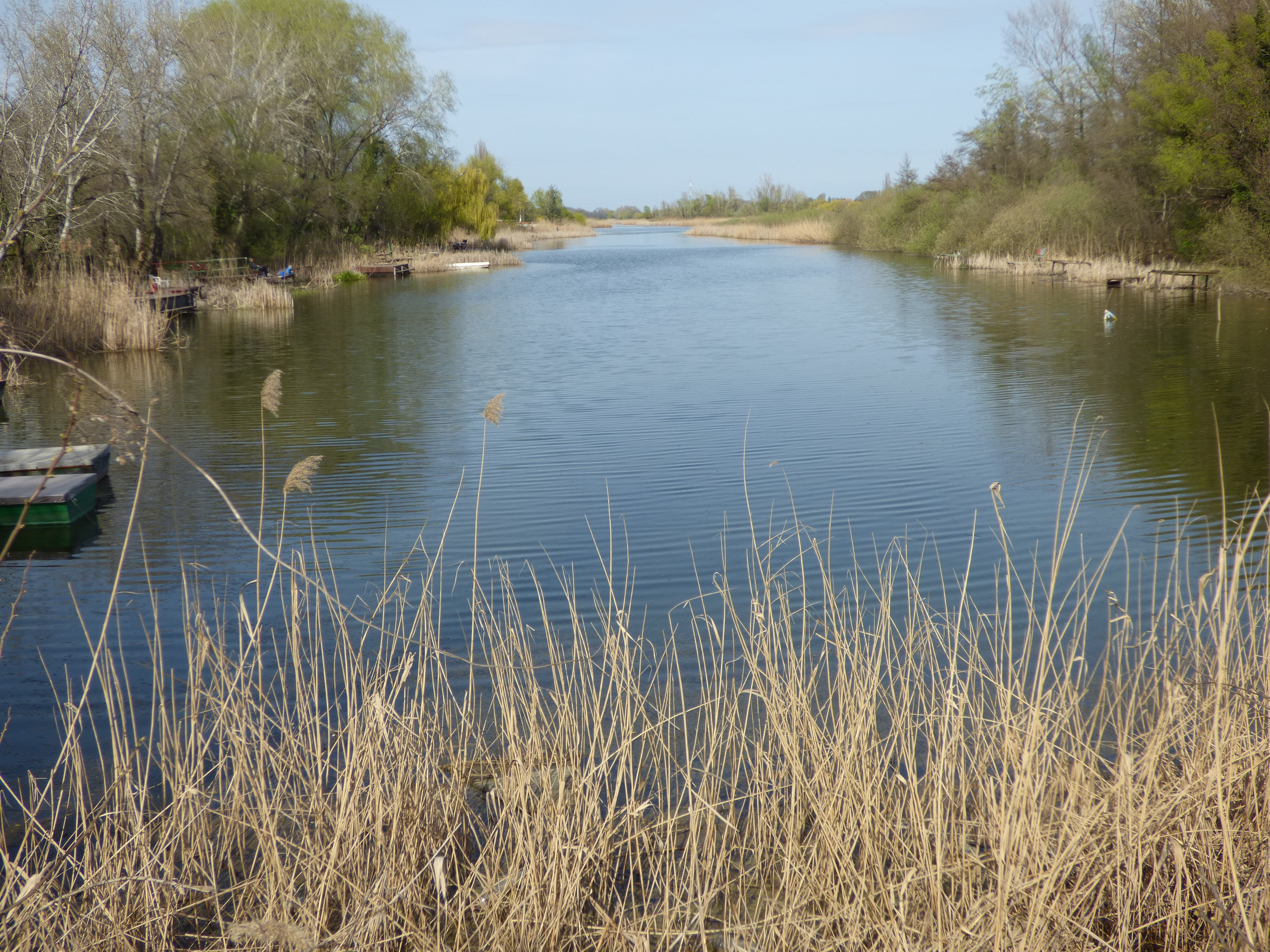
Landscape near Szigetszentmiklós

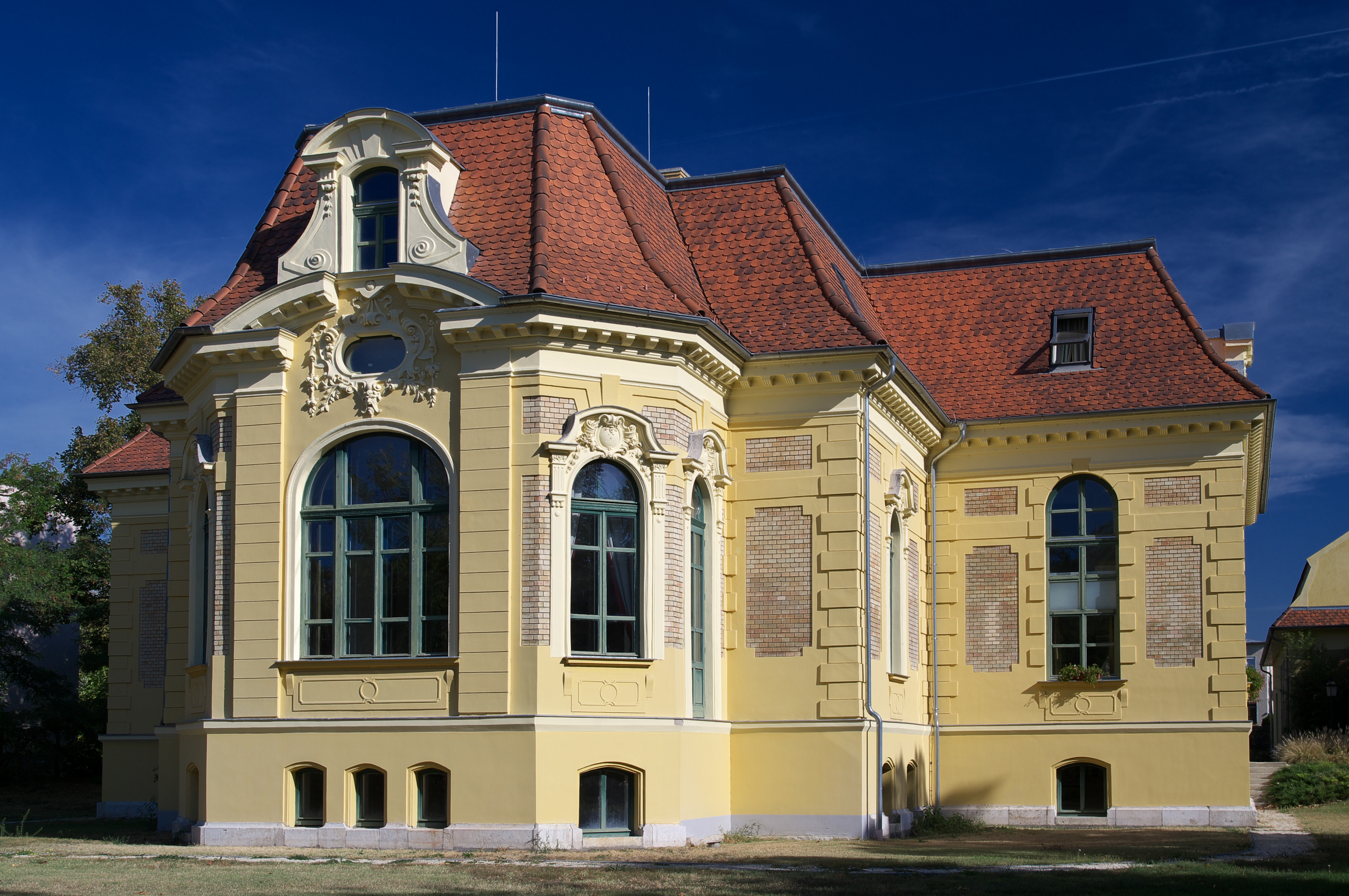
Malonyai Mansion in Halásztelek

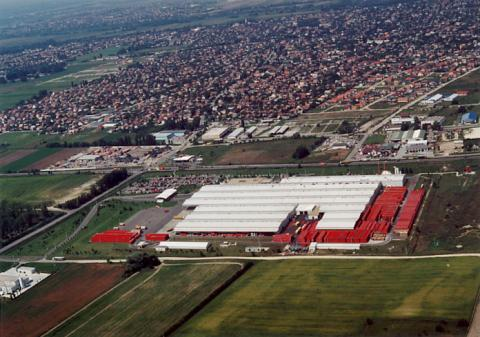
Aerial view of Dunaharaszti

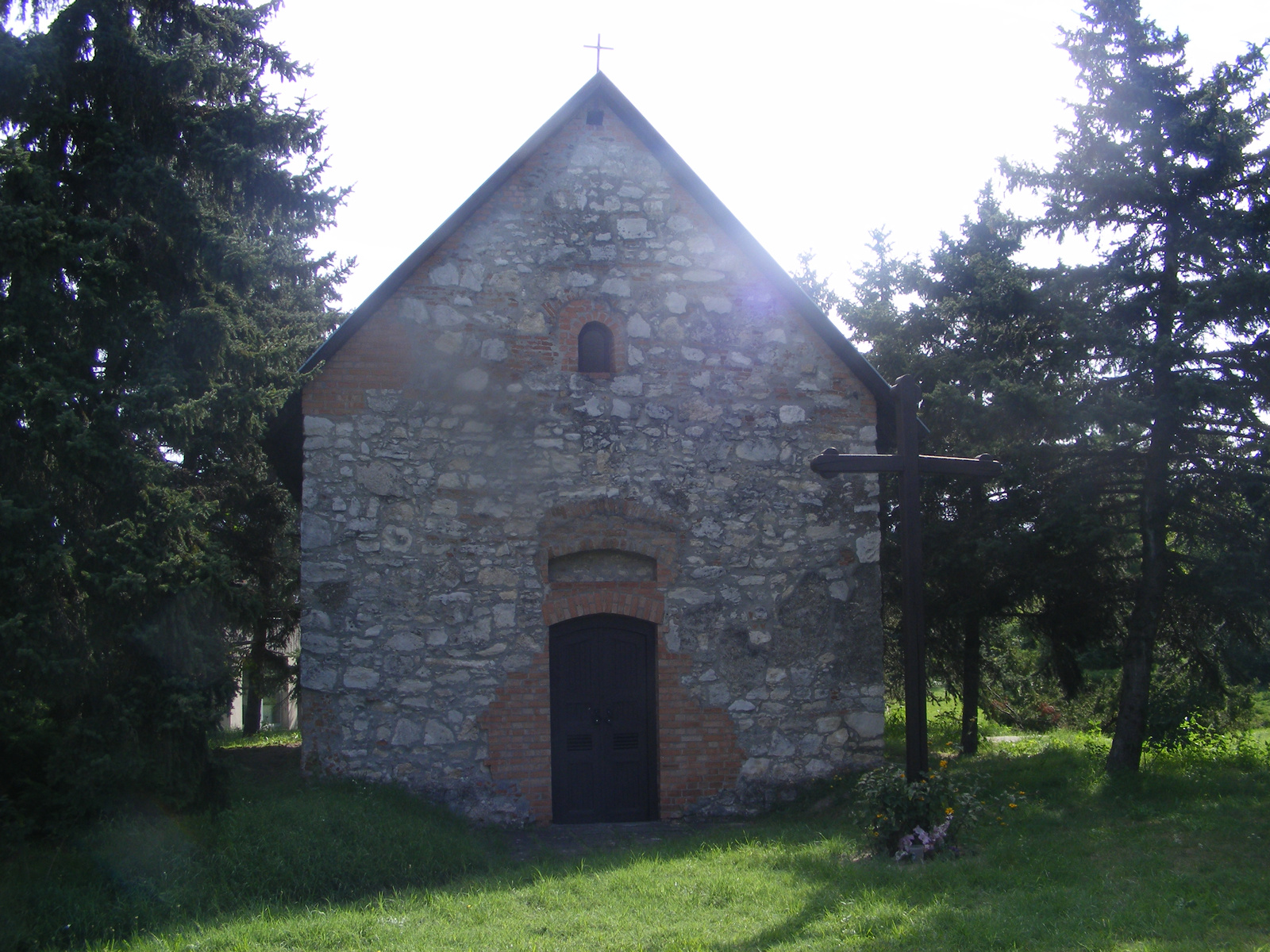
St. Anne Chapel in Tököl

== See also ==
- List of cities and towns in Hungary
