= Pál Hoffman =

Hungarian politician and handball player (born 1948)

Member of the National Assembly
- In office 14 May 2010 – 5 May 2014

Personal details
- Born: October 27, 1948 (age 77) Tököl, Hungary
- Party: Fidesz, KDNP
- Spouse: Ildikó Hoffman
- Children: 2
- Profession: politician

Pál Hoffman (born 27 October 1948) is a Hungarian politician and former professional handball player, who has been the mayor of Tököl since 1990. He was a member of the National Assembly (MP) for Szigetszentmiklós (Pest County Constituency XII) between 2010 and 2014.

== Biography ==
He finished secondary studies and took toolmaker professional exam at Fáy András Vocational School in 1967 and graduated as a teacher from Ho Si Minh Teacher Training College in 1982. He earned a business and marketing profession, a second degree in business economics in Szolnok in 1992.

Hoffman was a professional handball player between 1967 and 1990, who played for Ferencvárosi TC, Újpesti TE and Nyíregyháza Spartacus FC. He made four appearances for the Hungary men's national handball team.

He was elected Chairman of the Council then Mayor of Tököl in the 1990 local election. He was an MP candidate for Szigetszentmiklós during the 1998, 2002 and 2006 parliamentary elections as a member of the Fidesz against Gábor Kuncze (SZDSZ). He obtained a mandate in the 2010 parliamentary election and joined the parliamentary group of the Christian Democratic People's Party (KDNP). He was appointed a member of the Committee on Sport and Tourism on 14 May 2010 and Committee on Audit Office and Budget on 21 February 2011.

== Personal life ==
He is married. His wife is Ildikó Hoffman. They have two children.
