= Szigetszentmiklós =

City in Hungary

- Town
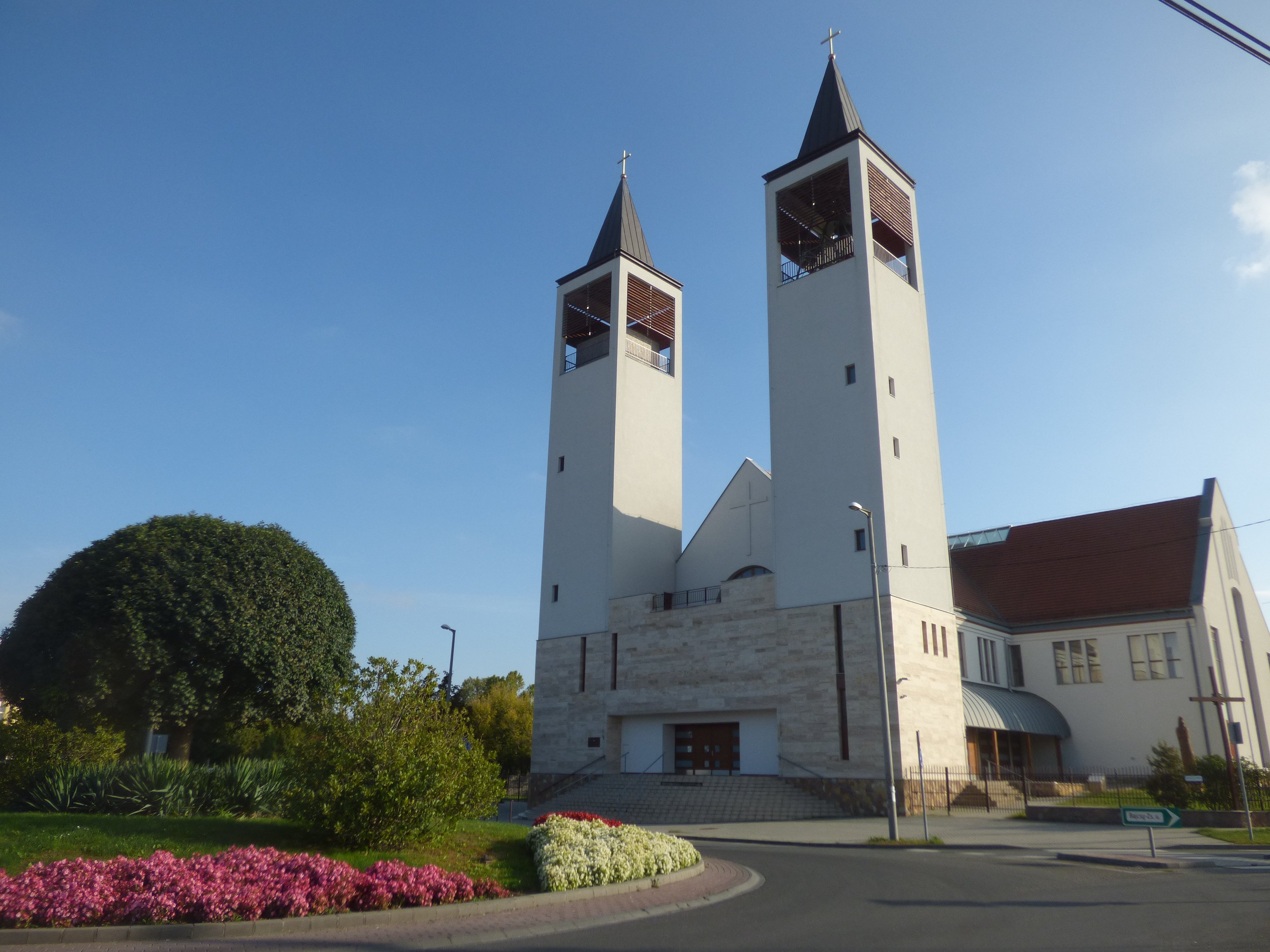
- Church of Saint Nicholas

- Flag Coat of arms

- Location of Szigetszentmiklós Szigetszentmiklós (Europe)
- Coordinates: 47°20′44″N 19°02′54″E
- Country: Hungary
- County: Pest County
- Subregion: Ráckeve

Government
  - Mayor: János Nagy

Area
  - Total: 45.65 km^{2} (17.63 sq mi)

Population (2020)
  - Total: 40,105
- Postal code: 2310
- Area code: 24
- Website: Official town website

Szigetszentmiklós (Hungarian: [ˈsiɡɛt.sɛntmikloːʃ]]; German: Nigglau) is a city in Pest County, Hungary, in the northern part of Csepel Island with around 40,000 inhabitants. As part of the Budapest metropolitan area, it has developed dynamically in recent decades, becoming a significant residential and economic hub. Its geographical location is unique, as the town lies on the banks of the Ráckevei-Duna , surrounded by a diverse array of natural habitats. The town is bordered to the north by Budapest's XXI. district, to the east by the Ráckevei-Duna, to the south by Szigethalom, and to the west by Halásztelek.

== Name ==
- Sziget – island: Szigetszentmiklós is a town on Csepel Island
- Szent Miklós – Saint Nicholas, who is the patron saint of Szigetszentmiklós

== Location ==
The town is located on the Csepel Island, right next to the southern border of Budapest. The settlement is bordered to the north by the XXI. district of Budapest, to the east by the Ráckevei-Duna (and thus by Dunaharaszti and Taksony), to the south by Szigethalom, to the southwest by Tököl, to the west by Halásztelek, and to the northwest by the Danube (and the XXII. district of Budapest on the river's right bank).

== History ==
After the Árpád dynasty was established, the region of today's Ráckeve belonged to the Hungarian king. Szigetszentmiklós became a town in January 1986. It mentioned in official document in 1264 the first time.

== Demographics ==
=== Ethnicity ===
- Hungarian: 91.3%
- German: 0.6%
- Slovak: 0.6%
- Romani: 0.5%
- Bulgarians: 0.2%
- Ukrainian: 0.1%
- Other/Undeclared: 8.5%

=== Religious denomination ===
- Roman Catholic: 35.9%
- Greek Catholic: 2.2%
- Calvinist: 21.4%
- Lutheran: 1.0%
- Other denomination: 2.1%
- Non-religious: 20.7%
- Undeclared: 16.6%

== Twin towns – sister cities ==
Szigetszentmiklós is twinned with:

- Busko-Zdrój, Poland (2003)
- Gheorgheni, Romania (1996)
- Gorna Oryahovitsa, Bulgaria (2004)
- Kočani, North Macedonia (2004)
- Oulu, Finland (1992)
- Specchia, Italy (2003)
- Steinheim, Germany (2003)
- Sveti Martin na Muri, Croatia (2004)
- Auce, Latvia (2024)

== Gallery ==
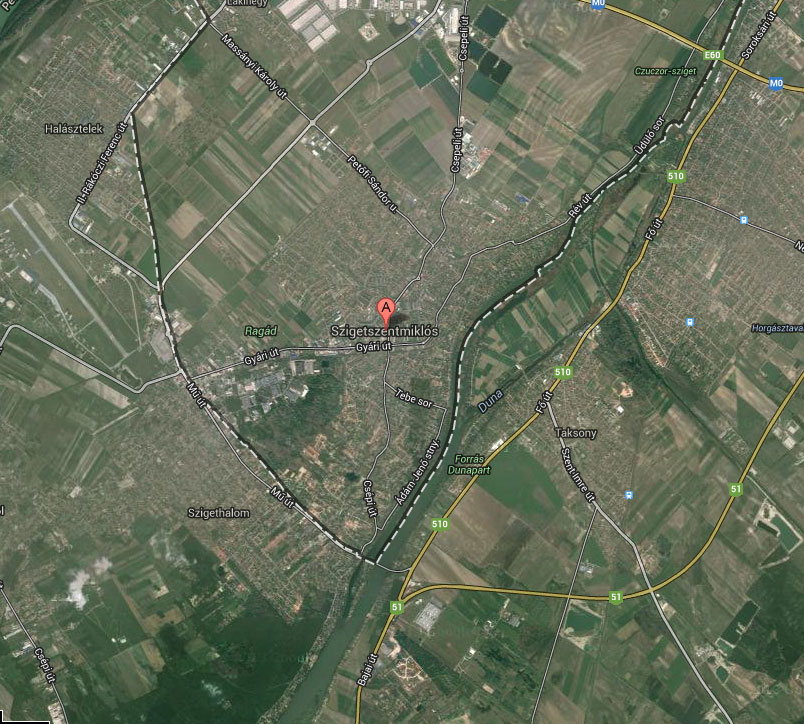
Szigetszentmiklós

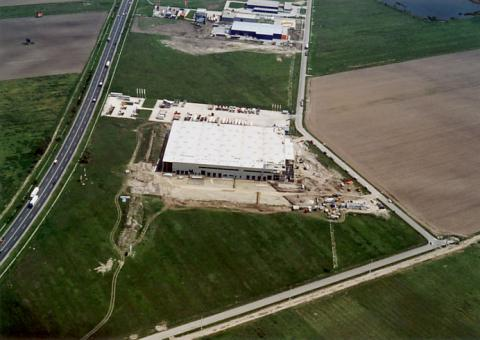
iparterület1

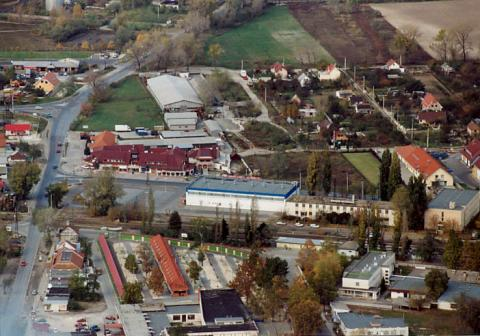
iparterület2

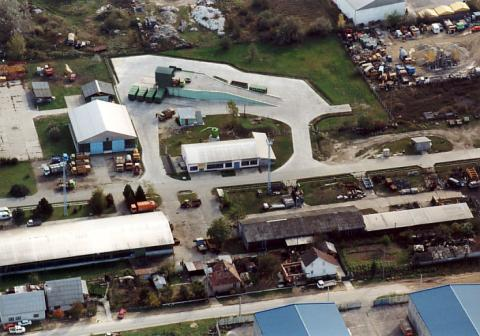
iparterület3

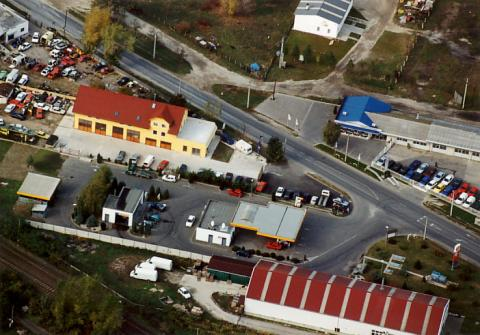
iparterület4

== Notable people ==
Artist János Nádasdy was born here in 1939.
