= Celestine Lazarus =

Nigerian footballer

Personal information
- Full name: Celestine Chukwuebuka Lazarus
- Date of birth: 13 November 1992 (age 33)
- Place of birth: Umuchu, Nigeria
- Height: 1.88 m (6 ft 2 in)
- Position: Centre-back

Youth career
- Flying Sport Academy Lagos
- Chievo Verona

Senior career*
Years	Team	Apps	(Gls)
2013	Honvéd Budapest	0	(0)
2014	Halásztelek		
2014–2015	Bodva Moldava nad Bodvou	24	(0)
2015–2016	Podbeskidzie Bielsko-Biała	4	(0)
2015–2016	Podbeskidzie Bielsko-Biała II	15	(0)
2016–2018	Zemplín Michalovce	5	(0)
2017	→ Lokomotíva Zvolen (loan)	9	(0)
2018	→ Noves Spišská Nová Ves (loan)	11	(0)
2018–2019	Slavoj Trebišov	25	(0)
2019	Gönyeli	2	(0)
2020	Slavoj Trebišov	1	(0)
2020	ATSV Stadl-Paura	9	(0)
2020	SPG Wels	14	(0)
2021–2022	FC Wels	15	(0)
2023	Issimo SE	8	(1)
- * Club domestic league appearances and goals as of 19:48, 27 November 2024 (UTC)

Celestine Lazarus (born 13 November 1992) is a Nigerian professional footballer who plays as a centre-back.

== Club career ==
=== Podbeskidzie Bielsko-Biała ===
He made his Ekstraklasa debut for Podbeskidzie Bielsko-Biała against Cracovia on 1 August 2015.

=== Gönyeli and return to Slavoj Trebišov ===
After a good season with Slavoj Trebišov in Slovakia, Lazarus moved to Turkish Cypriot club Gönyeli at the end of August 2019. He joined the club officially on 12 September 2019, but however, after only two games, he resigned again on 25 September 2019. Lazarus then returned to Slavoj in 2020.

=== Issimo SE ===
Lazarus joined Issimo SE in July 2023.
