= Halásztelek =

Halásztelek Халастелек
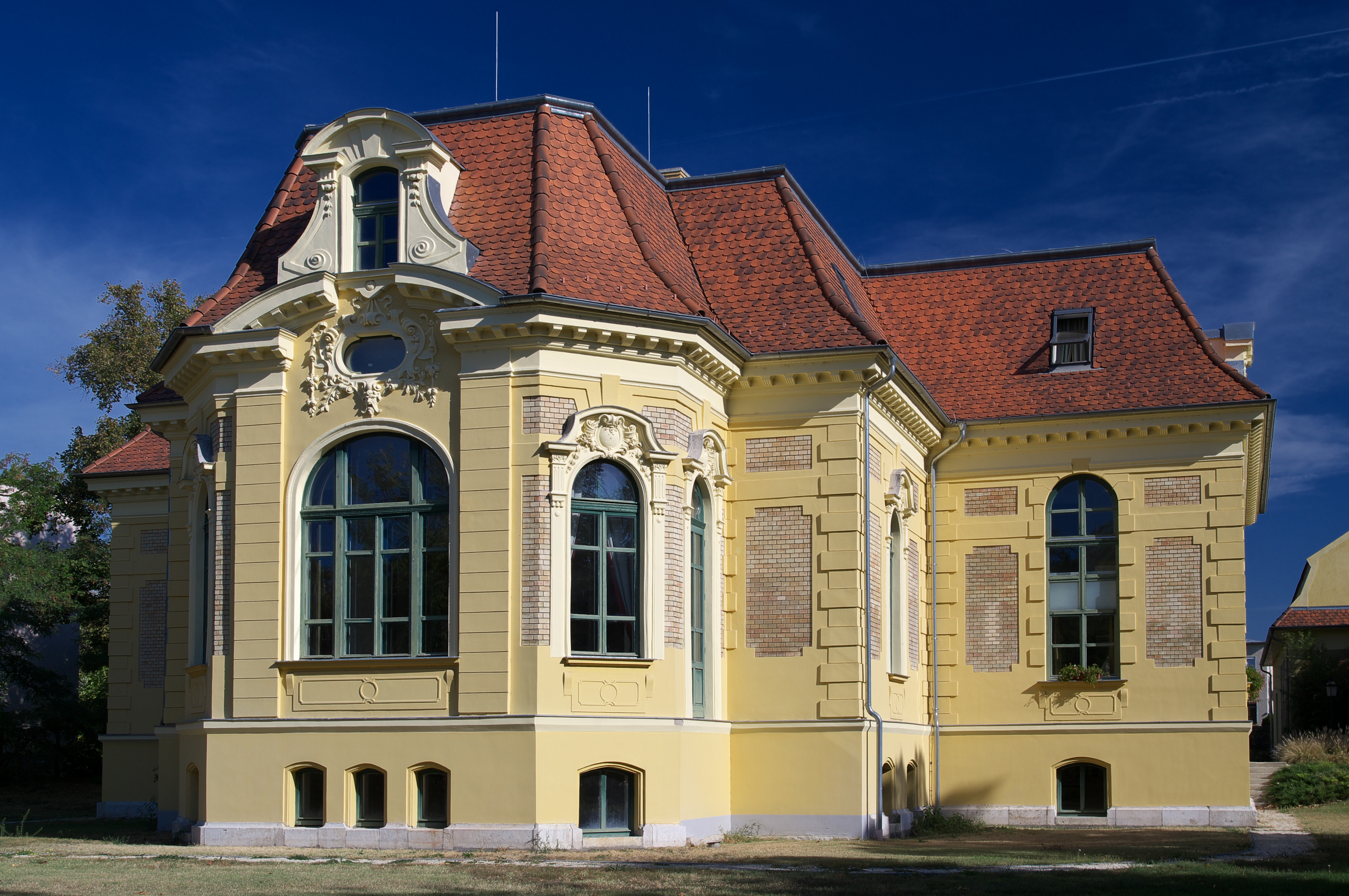
- Malonyai Castle

- Flag Coat of arms

- Location of Halásztelek in Hungary
- Coordinates: 47°21′39″N 18°59′16″E
- Country: Hungary
- Region: Central Hungary
- County: Pest
- District: Szigetszentmiklós

Government
  - Mayor: Nagy Barnabás; Hungarian Civic Alliance, "FIDESZ"

Area
  - Total: 8.64 km^{2} (3.34 sq mi)

Population (2009)
  - Total: 8,620
  - Density: 998/km^{2} (2,580/sq mi)
- Time zone: UTC+1 (CET)
  - Summer (DST): UTC+2 (CEST)
- Postal code: 2314
- Area code: +36 24
- KSH code: 09690
- Website: www.halasztelek.hu

Halásztelek (Bulgarian: Халастелек, romanized: Halastelek) is a town in Pest County, Hungary. Halásztelek lies on the northern part of Csepel Island, on the Danube.

== History ==
The Romans, during their occupation, found Halásztelek dangerous because of the regular flooding of the Danube. It is likely that Attila the Hun started his attacks here against the Roman fortress which may have been at Százhalombatta. The occupying Hungarians from East Asia used Csepel Island as a summer retreat, and Szőlős, Háros and Tököl grew into settlements over time.

At the end of the 19th century the population of Halásztelek numbered no more than fifty.

The settlement was named after Ernő Warmann's sister and was called Herminamajor ("Hermina's field") or Herminatelep ("Hermina's land"). The next owner was Pál Sándor who grew melons. As agriculture became more developed, the population started to increase and in 1920 it reached 254 people. Not much later, the settlement had new owners in the Malonyay family, whose castle was famed for its balls. During the world economic crisis of the 1930s the family went bankrupt and workers and Bulgarian families started to buy parts of their estate (which is why signs at the town limits are in both Cyrillic and Latin alphabets). After these sales of the estate, the castle's value was greatly reduced, and István Füzessy became its owner. It is said that he lost the castle in a card game to Emil Stein. Stein planted peach orchards, and the land around the castle is still known as such, even though the land is now used for housing.

After World War II the population rapidly increased, especially with migration from Zala County, Szabolcs-Szatmár-Bereg County, Jász-Nagykun-Szolnok County and Hajdú-Bihar County. In 1949, the population was 1,401.

From 1 May 1950 the settlement became an independent village (Hungarian: község) called Herminatelep. In 1951 it changed to its current name of Halásztelek. Around that time the population was around 1,500, but its proximity to Budapest had the population double by 1955.

From the 1970s, with the population increase, the settlement became more modernized and 70% of all properties had mains water and electricity. During this time the telephone network was also introduced to the area.

On 1 July 2008 Halásztelek got status of a town.

== Transport ==
The M0 leads to Halásztelek from Lakihegy.

The transport infrastructure started to develop from the 1950s, and the BKV Budapesti Közlekedési Vállalat, "Mass Transport Company of Budapest" started to run one bus route, increasing to three in the 1960s. After Communist rule ended, the BKV ended operations, which were taken over by the Volánbusz company. The increased population led to increasing demands on the roads, and new ones were built.

== Education ==
In 1944 the Tököl council decided the street names and opened a state school, and in this year education started as a single classroom in Mária Szabadosás apartment, which is now called Kisiskola ("Small School"). A few years later there were two classes, and when the settlement became independent a new school was built. In the 1970s there was a large change in education practice, and in 1971 a vocational school for horticulture opened, called nowadays István Bocskai Reformed Secondary School.

== Landmarks ==
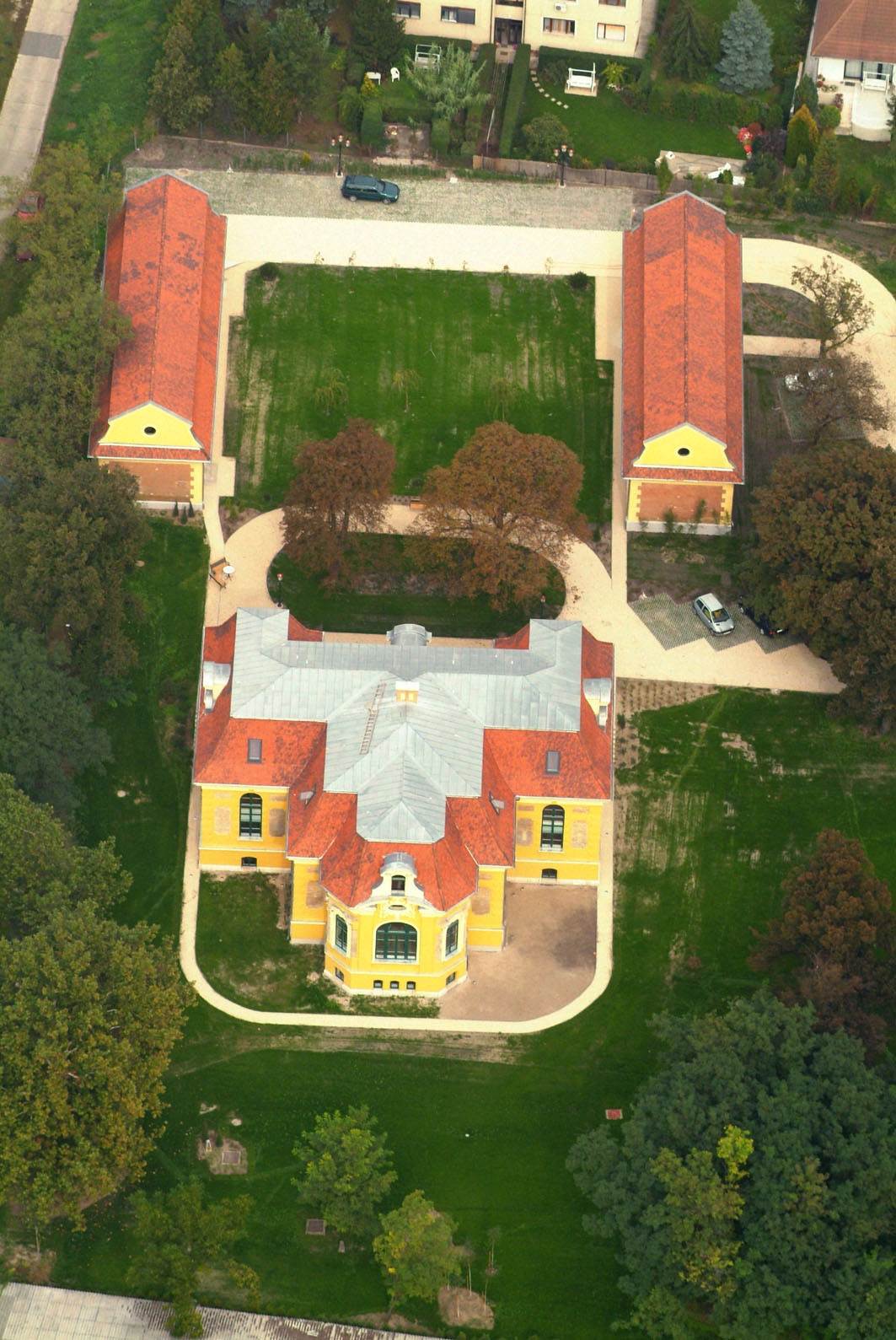
Aerial view of the Malonyai Castle

- Malonyay Castle

== Notable people ==
- László Cseh, swimmer
- Balázs Hárai, water polo player

== Twin towns – sister cities ==
Halásztelek is twinned with:

- Ilieni, Romania
- Leisnig, Germany
- Nikopol, Bulgaria
- Oggiono, Italy
- Polikraishte (Gorna Oryahovitsa), Bulgaria
- Rousínov, Czech Republic

== Sport ==
- Halásztelek FC, the town's football club
