= László Répási =

Hungarian footballer

Personal information
- Full name: László Répási
- Date of birth: 23 March 1966 (age 60)
- Place of birth: Budapest, Hungary
- Height: 1.85 m (6 ft 1 in)
- Position: Forward

Youth career
- Ferencváros

Senior career*
Years	Team	Apps	(Gls)
1983–1989	Ferencváros	20	(6)
1989–1994	MTE Izzo Vác	109	(41)
1994	Csepel Budapest	8	(1)
1995	MTK Budapest		
1995–1996	Espinho	18	(4)
1996	Vác FC-Samsung	8	(1)
1996	Paks	7	(2)
1997	Perak	26	(19)
1997–1998	TPV Tampere	2	(0)
1998	Perak	18	(8)

International career
1993	Hungary	1	(0)

Managerial career
- 2005–2006: Halásztelek FC
- 2006–: Halásztelek FC Youth Teams
- * Club domestic league appearances and goals

László Répási (born 23 March 1966) is a retired Hungarian football forward.

== Club career ==
During his career, he won one Borsodi Liga with MTE Izzo Vác and he became top goalscorer in a league twice (with MTE Izzo Vác & Perak FA). He also won Malaysia Cup with Perak FA in 1998. His preferred playing position is as a striker, but he can also operate as a goal assistant.

== International career ==
He made his debut for the Hungary national team in 1993, and got 1 cap.
