= Paolo Falciani =

Italian painter (1790–1851)

- Born: 1790; Salerno
- Died: 1851 (aged 60–61)
- Occupation: Italian painter

Paolo Falciani (Salerno, 1790 - 1851) was an Italian painter, depicting portraits and history painting in a neoclassical style.

== Biography ==
He studied at the academy of Naples during the French occupation, and obtained a stipend to study in Rome. He exhibited Enea al Cospetto di Didone at the Bourbonic Exposition in 1826. After 1820, he taught painting with Camillo Guerra at the Neapolitan Academy. In 1823 he was honorary professor at the Academy of Fine Arts of Naples.
