= Dunavarsány =

- Town
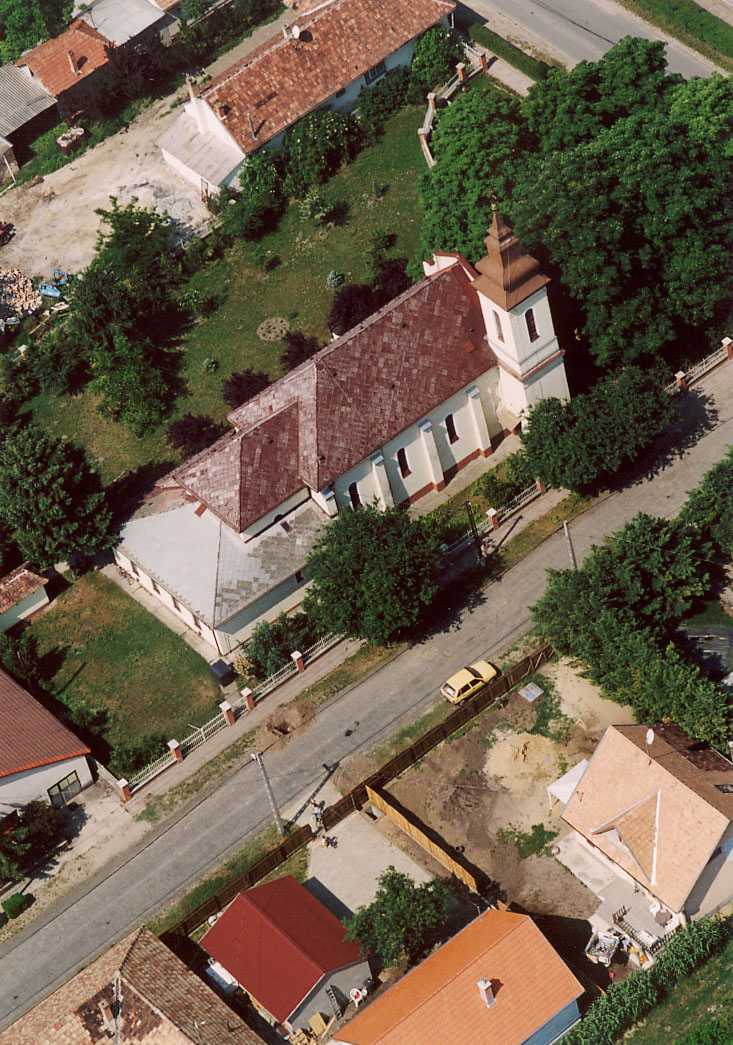

- Flag Coat of arms

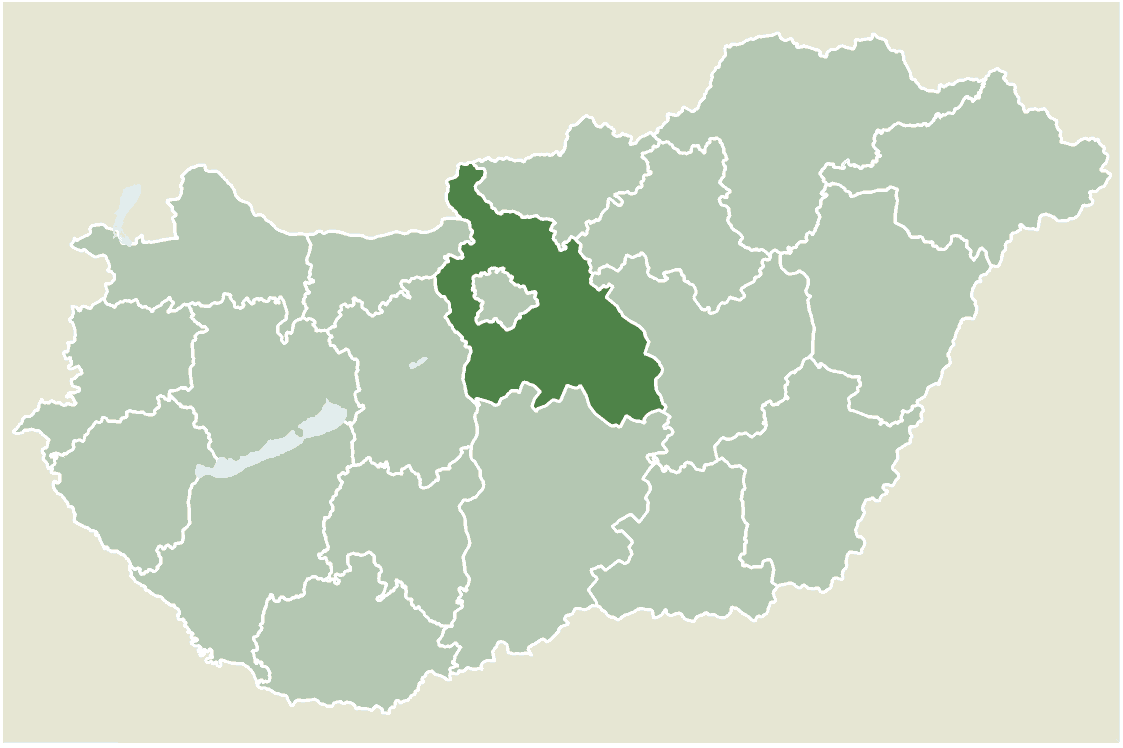
- Location of Pest county in Hungary

- Location of Dunavarsány
- Coordinates: 47.27805°N 19.06717°E
- Country: Hungary
- County: Pest
- District: Szigetszentmiklós

Area
  - Total: 22.52 km^{2} (8.70 sq mi)

Population (2019)
  - Total: 8,341
  - Density: 370.4/km^{2} (959.3/sq mi)
- Time zone: UTC+1 (CET)
  - Summer (DST): UTC+2 (CEST)
- Postal code: 2336
- Area code: (+36) 24
- Website: www.dunavarsany.hu

Dunavarsány is a town in Pest County, Budapest metropolitan area, Hungary.

== Twin towns – sister cities ==
Dunavarsány is twinned with:

- Gemmingen, Germany (1997)
- Slavec, Slovakia (2002)
- Chetfalva, Ukraine (2008)
- Kozienice, Poland (2010)
- Derventa, Bosnia and Herzegovina (2016)
- Ostend, Belgium (2018)
- Kaunas, Lithuania (2019)
- Čurug, Serbia (2021)
- Dübendorf, Switzerland (2022)
- Salerno, Italy (2023)
- Haderslev, Denmark (2024)
- Volos, Greece (2025)
