= Salerno =

City in Campania, Italy

Salerno Salierno (Neapolitan)
- Comune
- Comune di Salerno
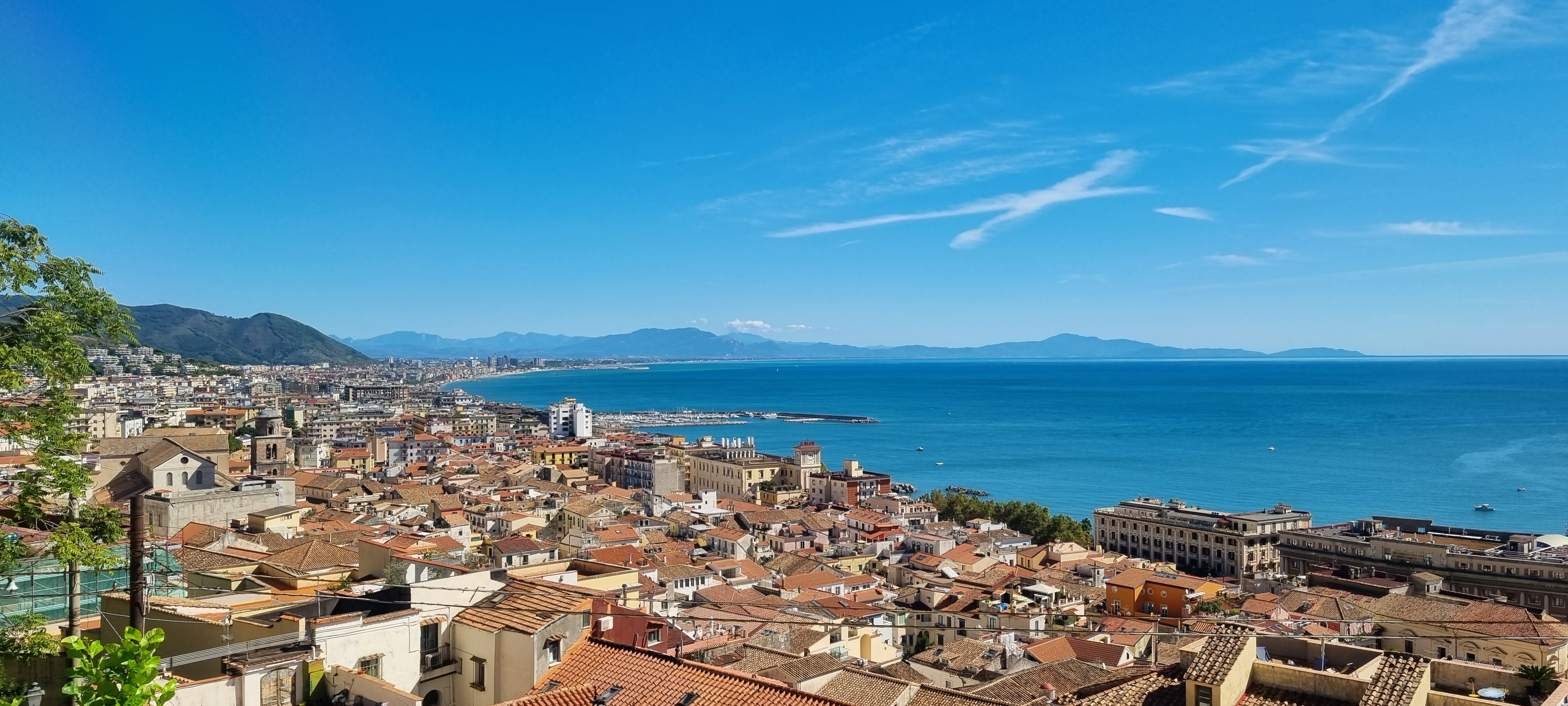
- View of Salerno

- Flag Coat of arms

- Salerno within the Province of Salerno and Campania

- Location within Italy Location within Campania
- Coordinates: 40°40′50″N 14°45′34″E
- Country: Italy
- Region: Campania
- Province: Salerno (SA)
- Founded: 197 BC

Government
  - Mayor: Vincenzo De Luca

Area
  - Total: 59.85 km^{2} (23.11 sq mi)
- Elevation: 4 m (13 ft)

Population (2026)
  - Total: 125,323
  - Density: 2,094/km^{2} (5,423/sq mi)
- Demonym: Salernitano
- Time zone: UTC+1 (CET)
  - Summer (DST): UTC+2 (CEST)
- Postal code: 84121–84135
- Dialing code: 089
- Patron saint: Saint Matthew
- Website: Official website

Salerno (UK: /sæˈlɛərnoʊ/, US: /səˈ-, sɑːˈ-, səˈlɜːrnoʊ/; Italian: [saˈlɛrno]; Neapolitan: Salierno [saˈljernə]) is a city and comune (municipality) in the region of Campania in southern Italy, and the capital of the province of the same name. As of 2026, with a population of 125,323, it is the 3rd most populous city in the region after Naples and Giugliano in Campania. The city lies on the Gulf of Salerno, on the Tyrrhenian Sea.

Salerno city’s origins are probably Magna Greece, though the dated archaeological evidence cited is a 6th-century BC Etruscan-Campanian necropolis; the clearer Magna Graecia link is nearby Poseidonia/Paestum. Salerno was home to the Schola Medica Salernitana, one of the earliest medical institutions in Europe, active by the 11th century and widely regarded as a forerunner of the modern university. From February to August 1944, it served as the seat of the Italian government, hosting the Badoglio and Bonomi cabinets at the Salone dei Marmi. It was during this period that the Italian Communist Party agreed to join a national unity government, a decision known as the "Salerno turn" that opened the way to the Allied reconquest of the peninsula. For these months the city was effectively Italy's capital city, and it was here that Victor Emmanuel III settled after leaving Rome in the wake of the Armistice of Cassibile.

During the Early Middle Ages, under Lombard rule, Salerno flourished as the capital of the Principality of Salerno, which gradually came to encompass much of Southern Italy. It regained capital status under the Normans, serving as the seat of the Duchy of Apulia and Calabria. Later, under the Angevins, the title of Prince of Salerno was conferred on the heirs apparent to the throne of the Kingdom of Naples. From the 13th to the 19th century the city was also the capital of the province of Principato Citeriore.

Since 1968, the city has hosted the University of Salerno, which in 1988 was relocated as a campus to the neighbouring municipalities of Fisciano and Baronissi.

In September 1943, Salerno was one of the landing sites of Operation Avalanche, the Allied invasion of mainland Italy.

The modern city is divided into three distinct zones: the medieval centro storico, a 19th-century quarter, and the more extensive post-war residential districts, dominated by apartment blocks. One of its patron saints is Matthew the Apostle, whose relics are preserved in the crypt of Salerno Cathedral.

== History ==
=== Prehistory and antiquity ===
The area of what is now Salerno has been continuously settled since pre-historical times, as the discoveries of Neolithic mummy remains documents. Inhabited by Oscan-speaking populations, the region was colonized by the Etruscans, who founded the city of Irnthi in the 6th century BC, across the Irno river, in what is today the urban district of Fratte, as a part of their Dodecapolis political model that they had essentially replicated in Campania. This settlement represented an important base for Etruscan trade with the nearby Greek colonies of Posidonia and Elea. It was occupied by the Samnites around the 5th century BC as a consequence of the Battle of Cumae (474 BC) as part of the Syracusan sphere of influence.

With the Roman advance in Campania, Irna began to lose its importance, being supplanted by the new Roman colony (197 BC) of Salernum, developing around an initial castrum. The new city, which gradually lost its military function in favour of its role as a trade centre, was connected to Rome by the Via Popilia, which ran towards Lucania and Reggio Calabria.

Archaeological remains, although fragmentary, suggest the idea of a flourishing and lively city. Under the Emperor Diocletian, in the late 3rd century AD, Salernum became the administrative centre of the Lucania and Bruttii province.

In the following century, during the Gothic Wars, the Goths were defeated by the Byzantines, and the Salerno briefly returned to the control of Constantinople (from 553 to 568), before the Lombards invaded almost the whole peninsula. Like many coastal cities of southern Italy (Gaeta, Sorrento, Amalfi), Salerno initially remained untouched by the newcomers, falling only in 646. It subsequently became part of the Duchy of Benevento.

=== Middle Ages to early modern age ===
The Principality of Salerno in 1000

Under the Lombard dukes, Salerno enjoyed a splendid period of growth.

In 774, Arechis II of Benevento transferred the seat of the Duchy of Benevento to Salerno, in order to elude Charlemagne's offensive and to secure for himself the control of a strategic area, the centre of coastal and internal communications in Campania.

Under Arechis II, Salerno became a centre of studies with its famous Medical School. The Lombard prince ordered the city to be fortified; the Castle on the Bonadies mountain had already been built with walls and towers. In 839, Salerno declared independence from Benevento, becoming the capital of a flourishing principality stretching out to Capua, northern Calabria and Apulia up to Taranto. In 871–872, the Aghlabids besieged Salerno, but the city was relieved by Louis II of Italy.

Around the year 1000, prince Guaimar IV annexed Amalfi, Sorrento, Gaeta and the whole duchy of Apulia and Calabria, starting to conceive a future unification of the whole southern Italy under Salerno's arms. The coins minted in the city circulated all over the Mediterranean, with the Opulenta Salernum wording to certify its richness.

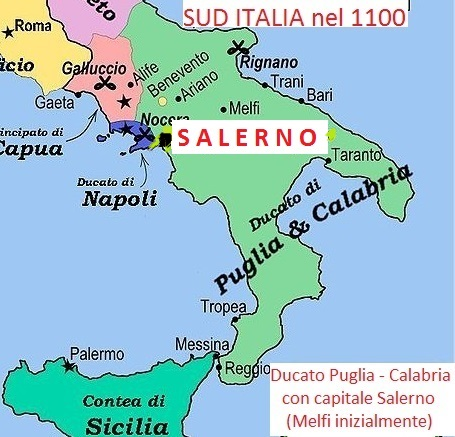
Salerno capital of the Norman "Ducato di Puglia e Calabria" in 1100

However, the stability of the Principate was continually shaken by the Saracen attacks and, most of all, by internal struggles. In 1056, one of the numerous plots led to the fall of Guaimar. His weaker son Gisulf II succeeded him, but the decline of the principality had begun. In 1077, Salerno reached its zenith but soon lost all its territory to the Normans.

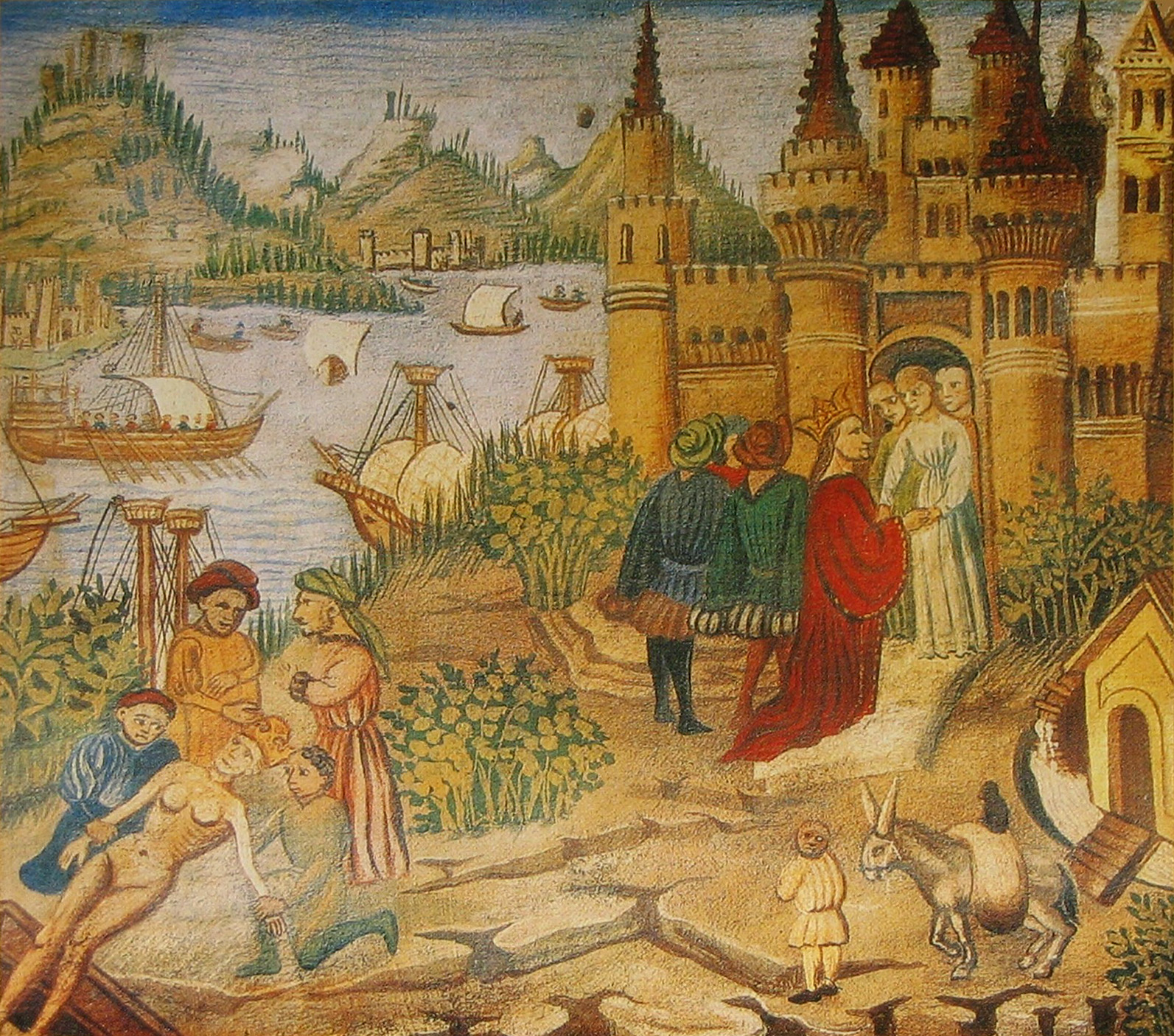
The Schola Medica Salernitana in a miniature from Avicenna's Canon

On 13 December 1076, the Norman conqueror Robert Guiscard, who had married Guaimar IV's daughter Sikelgaita, besieged Salerno and defeated his brother-in-law Gisulf. In this period, the royal palace of Castel Terracena and the cathedral were built, and science was promoted as the Schola Medica Salernitana, open to women like Trota of Salerno and Mercuriade also, considered the most ancient medical institution of the European West, reached its maximum splendour with texts like Trotula. By the late 11th century, the city was home to 50,000 people.

In 1100, Salerno was made the capital of Norman southern Italy, after Melfi.

Salerno was an important city of the Normans for half a century, but with the Norman conquest of southern Italy, the city of Palermo started to overtake Salerno in status. Salerno played a little part in the fall of the County of Sicily, after the Emperor Henry VI's invasion on behalf of his wife, Constance, the heiress to the kingdom, in 1191, Salerno surrendered and promised loyalty on the news of an incoming army.

This had so disgusted the archbishop, Nicolò d'Aiello (from Naples), that he abandoned the city and fled to Naples, which held out in a siege. In 1194, the situation reversed itself: Naples capitulated, along with most other cities of the Mezzogiorno, and only Salerno resisted. It was sacked and pillaged, much reducing its importance and prosperity.

Henry had his reasons, though. He had entrusted Constance to some important Salerno citizens (advised & ruled by the archbishop d'Aiello) and after his retreat from invasion in 1191 they had received letters about the events from Nicolò D'Aiello and so betrayed Henry, attacked Constance at Castel Terracena and handed her over to King Tancred of Sicily, making the Empress captive for nearly one year. The combined treachery and stubbornness of D'Aiello and his followers cost Salerno much after the Hohenstaufen conquest: Henry's son, Frederick II, moreover, issued a series of edicts that reduced Salerno's role in favour of Naples (in particular, the foundation of the University of Naples in that city).

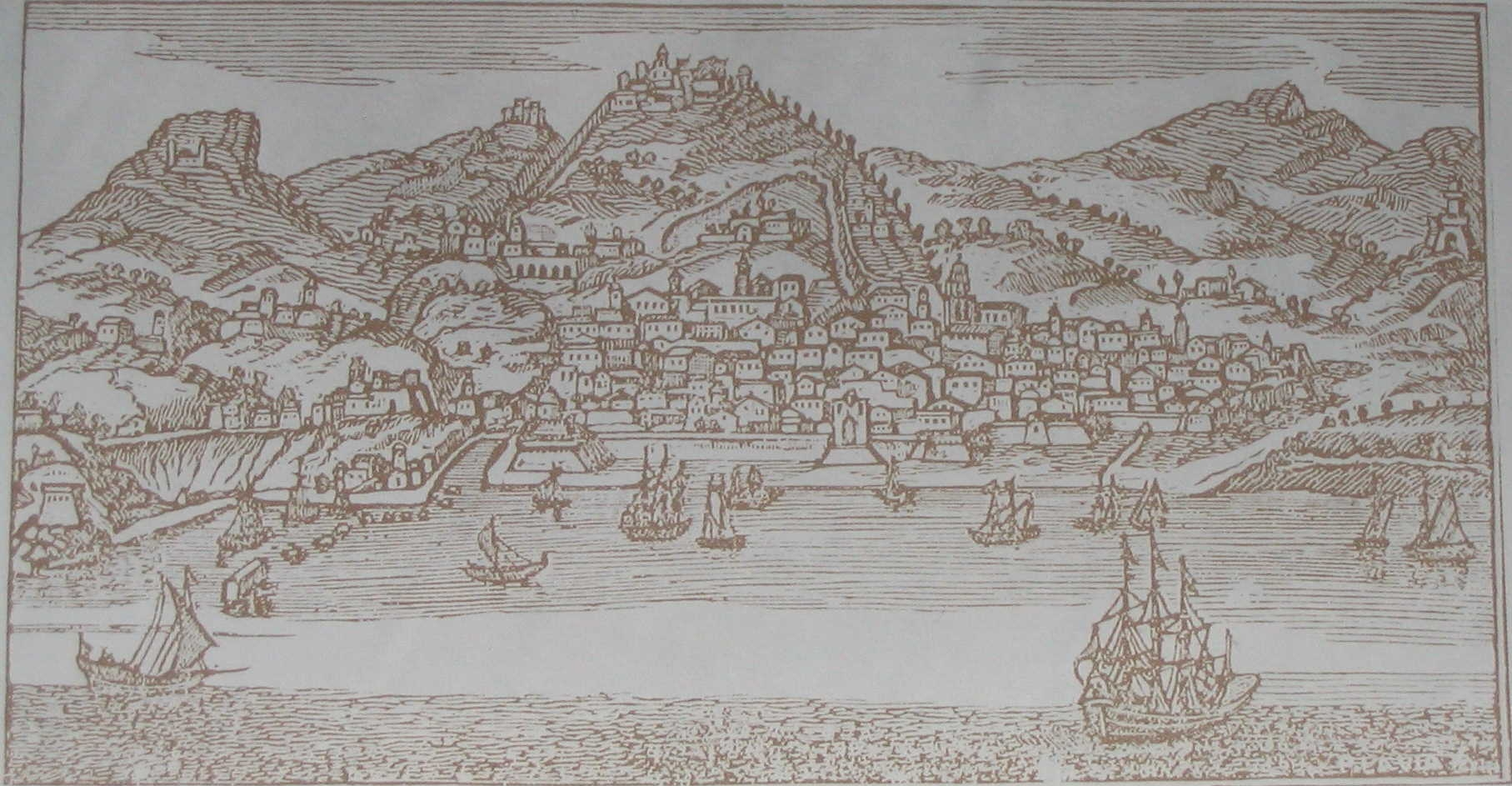
Salerno in a print from the 17th century

At Charles II of Naples, his father Charles I of Anjou granted the Principality of Salerno in the Kingdom of Sicily (or Regno) in 1272.

From the 14th century onwards, most of the Salerno province became the territory of the Princes of Sanseverino, powerful feudal lords who acted as real owners of the region. They accumulated enormous political and administrative power and attracted artists and men of letters in their own princely palace. In the 15th century, the city was the scene of battles between the Angevin and the Aragonese royal houses with whom the local lords took sides alternatingly.

In the first decades of the 16th century, the last descendant of the Sanseverino princes, Ferdinando Sanseverino, was in conflict with the viceroy of the king of Spain, mainly because of his opposition to the Inquisition, causing the ruin of the whole family and the beginning of a long period of decadence for the city.

A slow renewal of the city occurred in the 18th century with the end of the Spanish dominion and the construction of many refined houses and churches characterising the main streets of the historical centre. In 1799, Salerno was incorporated into the Parthenopean Republic. During the Napoleonic era, first Joseph Bonaparte and then Joachim Murat ascended the Neapolitan throne. The latter decreed the closing of the Schola Medica Salernitana, which had been declining for decades to the level of a theoretical school. In the same period, even the religious orders were suppressed and numerous ecclesiastical properties were confiscated.

The city expanded beyond the ancient walls and sea connections were potentiated as they represented an important road network that crossed the town connecting the eastern plain with the area leading to Vietri and Naples.

=== Late modern and contemporary ===
Salerno was an active center of Carbonari activities supporting the unification of Italy in the 19th century. The majority of the population of Salerno supported ideas of the Risorgimento against the Bourbon, and in 1861 many of them joined Garibaldi in his struggle for unification.

After the unification of Italy, a slow urban development continued, many suburban areas were enlarged and large public and private buildings were created. The city went on developing until World War II. Its population rose from 20,000 people around 1861s unification to 80,000 in the early 20th century.

During the 19th century, foreign industries started settling in Salerno: in 1830, the first textile mill was established by the Swiss entrepreneur Züblin Vonwiller, followed by Schlaepfer-Wenner's textile mills and dye factories; the Wenner family settled permanently in Salerno. In 1877, the city was the site of as many as 21 textile mills employing around ten thousand workers; in comparison with the four thousand employed in Turin's textile industry, Salerno was sometimes referred to as the "Manchester of the two Sicilies".

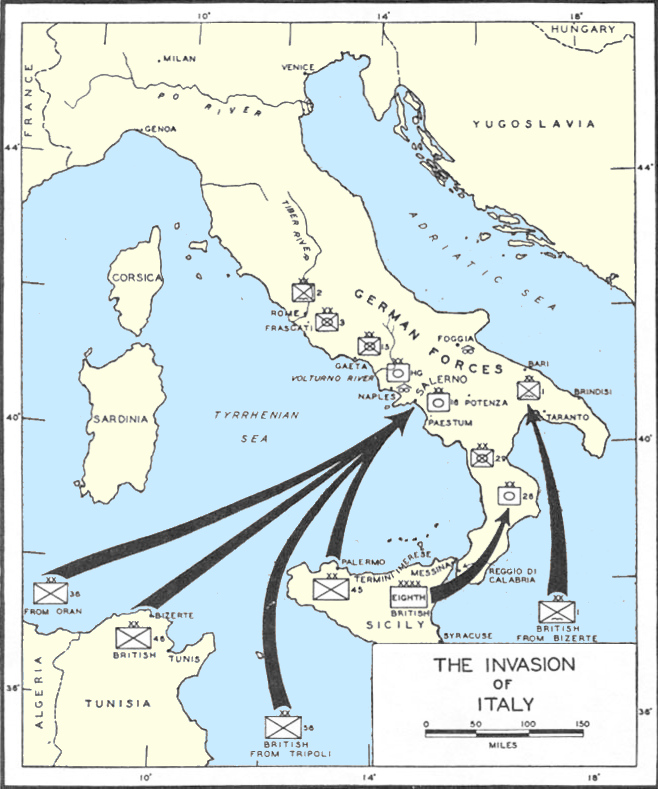
The Allied landing at Salerno (September 1943)

In September 1943, during World War II, Salerno was the scene of Operation Avalanche, the invasion of Italy launched by the Allies of World War II, and suffered a great deal of damage. Henry Wellesley, 6th Duke of Wellington, who was killed in action during the fighting, is buried in Salerno War Cemetery. From 12 February to 17 July 1944, it hosted the Government of Marshal Pietro Badoglio. In those months Salerno was the provisional government seat of the Kingdom of Italy, and the King Vittorio Emanuele III lived in a mansion in its outskirts.

After the war the population of the city doubled, going from 80,000 in 1946 to nearly 160,000 in 1976.

== Geography ==
The city is situated at the northwestern end of the plain of the Sele River, at the exact beginning of the Amalfi coast. The small river Irno crosses through the central section of Salerno. The highest point is Monte Stella at 953 metres (3,127 ft).

=== Climate ===
Salerno has a Mediterranean climate, with a hot and relatively dry summer (highs of 31 °C (88 °F) in July and August) and a rainy autumn and winter (highs of 13 °C (55 °F) in January). Usually there is nearly 1,000 mm (39 in) of rain every year. The strong wind that comes from the mountains toward the Gulf of Salerno makes the city very windy (mainly in winter). This gives Salerno the advantage of being one of the sunniest towns in Italy.

Climate data for Salerno, Italy
Month	Jan	Feb	Mar	Apr	May	Jun	Jul	Aug	Sep	Oct	Nov	Dec	Year
Mean daily maximum °C (°F)	13.4 (56.1)	14.4 (57.9)	17.0 (62.6)	20.4 (68.7)	24.6 (76.3)	28.5 (83.3)	31.2 (88.2)	31.3 (88.3)	28.3 (82.9)	23.9 (75.0)	18.7 (65.7)	14.9 (58.8)	22.2 (72.0)
Daily mean °C (°F)	10.2 (50.4)	11.0 (51.8)	13.1 (55.6)	16.1 (61.0)	19.9 (67.8)	23.6 (74.5)	26.0 (78.8)	26.1 (79.0)	23.6 (74.5)	19.7 (67.5)	15.1 (59.2)	11.9 (53.4)	18.0 (64.5)
Mean daily minimum °C (°F)	7.0 (44.6)	7.6 (45.7)	9.1 (48.4)	11.8 (53.2)	15.2 (59.4)	18.6 (65.5)	20.8 (69.4)	20.8 (69.4)	18.8 (65.8)	15.5 (59.9)	11.5 (52.7)	8.9 (48.0)	13.8 (56.8)
Average precipitation mm (inches)	138 (5.4)	110 (4.3)	102 (4.0)	85 (3.3)	42 (1.7)	32 (1.3)	24 (0.9)	50 (2.0)	78 (3.1)	132 (5.2)	171 (6.7)	150 (5.9)	1,114 (43.8)
Average precipitation days	12	11	11	10	7	5	4	5	7	9	13	14	108
Source: globopix

== Demographics ==
Historical population
Year	Pop.	±%
1861	26,681	—
1871	27,579	+3.4%
1881	30,929	+12.1%
1901	42,466	+37.3%
1911	46,235	+8.9%
1921	53,785	+16.3%
1931	61,141	+13.7%
1936	67,186	+9.9%
1951	90,970	+35.4%
1961	117,363	+29.0%
1971	155,496	+32.5%
1981	157,385	+1.2%
1991	148,932	−5.4%
2001	144,078	−3.3%
2011	132,608	−8.0%
2021	128,136	−3.4%
Source: ISTAT

As of 2026, the population is 125,323, of which 47.2% are males, and 52.8% are females. Minors make up 13.4% of the population, and seniors make up 27.7%.

The population is overwhelmingly Roman Catholic.

=== Immigration ===
As of 2025, immigrants make up 6.0% of the population. The 5 largest foreign countries of birth are Ukraine, Georgia, the Philippines, Romania, and Bangladesh.

== Tourism ==
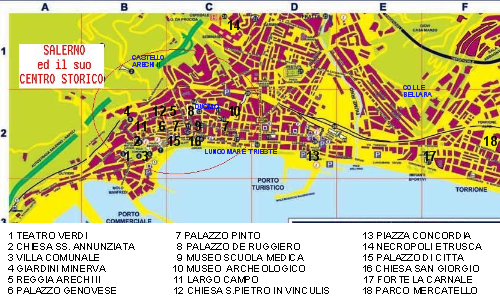
Main tourist sites of Salerno

Salerno is located at the geographical center of a triangle nicknamed Tourist Triangle of the 3 P's, with corners in Pompei, Paestum and Positano) This peculiarity is a source of tourism interest, as are sites including the Lungomare Trieste (Trieste Seafront Promenade), the Castello di Arechi (Arechis' Castle), the Duomo (cathedral) and the Museo Didattico della Scuola Medica Salernitana (Educational Museum of the Salernitan Medical School).

== Economy ==
The economy of Salerno is mainly based on services and tourism, as most of the city's manufacturing base did not survive the economic crisis of the 1970s. The remaining ones are connected to pottery and food production and treatment.

The Port of Salerno is one of the most active of the Tyrrhenian Sea. It handles about 10 million tons of cargo per year, 60% of which is made up by containers.

== Transport ==
Salerno is connected to the A2, Autostrada A3 and Autostrada A30 motorways.

Salerno station is the main railway station of the city. It is connected to the high-speed railway network via the Milan-Salerno corridor. The main bus stop of Salerno is also at the train station, with both CSTP buses and SITA buses.

A metro light rail line connects the train station with Stadio Arechi, with seven intermediate stops.

A new Maritime Terminal Station, designed by Zaha Hadid Architects, was completed in 2016 and was opened for the 2017 cruise season. Salerno features three marinas: Manfredi Pier, Masuccio Salernitano, and Marina di Arechi (opened in 2015). The commercial port of Manfredi is connected with the Amalfi coast and the islands of Gulf of Naples.

Salerno Airport is located in the neighboring towns of Pontecagnano Faiano and Bellizzi. However, the airport provide direct routes to some European destinations. Naples International Airport is also close by which offer more domestic and international destinations. It is located 68 km (42 mi) north west of Salerno.

== Education ==
Salerno hosted the oldest medical school in the world, the Scuola Medica Salernitana, the most important source of medical knowledge in Europe in the early Middle Ages. It was closed in 1811 by Joachim Murat.

In 1944, king Vittorio Emanuele III established Istituto Universitario di Magistero "Giovanni Cuomo". In 1968, the university became state-controlled. Today, University of Salerno is located in the neighboring town of Fisciano and has about 34,000 students and ten faculties: Arts and Philosophy, Economics, Education, Engineering, Foreign language and literature, Law, Mathematics, Physics and Natural Sciences, Medicine, Pharmacy and Political Science.

== Sport ==
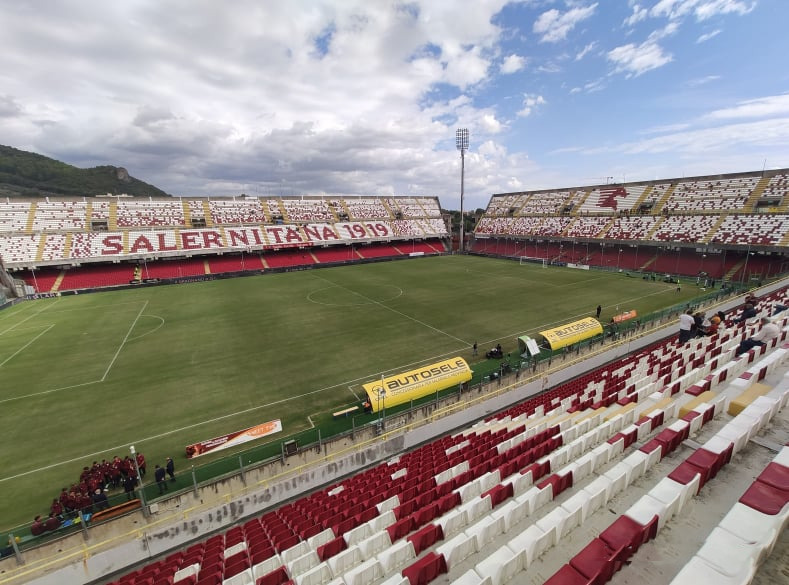
Stadio Arechi

The city's main football team is U.S. Salernitana 1919, that plays in the third level of Italian football, Serie C. Their home stadium is Stadio Arechi, opened in 1990 and with a capacity of 37,245.

The most successful team in the city is the women's handball team PDO Handball Team Salerno, with its nine national titles, eight national cups and eight national supercups; other noteworthy teams are Arechi in rugby and Rari Nantes Salerno in water polo.

The city has also a tradition in motorsport.

== Notable people ==
The following is a list of notable individuals from Salerno, Italy:

- Alfanus I (died 1085): Archbishop of Salerno, translator, theologian, and physician. He was a key figure in medieval literature and science.
- Abella of Salerno (14th century): Physician and medical writer associated with the Salerno School of Medicine, recognized for her contributions to bile studies and women's health.
- Mercuriade (14th century): Italian physician, surgeon, and medical author, remembered as one of the few female physicians of the Middle Ages.
- Roberto Sanseverino, Prince of Salerno (c. 1430–1474): First Prince of Salerno, Grand Admiral of the Kingdom of Naples, and a notable patron of the arts.
- Ferdinando Sanseverino, Prince of Salerno (1507–1568): Fourth and last Prince of Salerno, condottiero, and Renaissance patron, famous for his opposition to the Spanish Inquisition.
- Giuseppe Giulio Salati (1847–1930): Italian lawyer and historian, author of "L'Antica Gioi," which captures the history of the Commune of Gioi.
- Mara Carfagna (born 1975): Italian politician and former showgirl, serving as Minister for Equal Opportunities.
- Rocco Hunt (born 1994): Italian rapper and songwriter, acclaimed for his contributions to Italian hip-hop.
- Giuliana de Sio (born 1956): Italian actress known for her roles in film and television.
- Paolo Falciani (1790–1851): painter
- Enzo Maresca (born 1980): ex Football player and manager

== International relations ==
=== Twin towns – sister cities ===
Salerno is twinned with:

- Tōno, Japan, since 1984
- Rouen, France, since 2003
- Montpellier, France, since 2008
- (United States) Baltimore, U.S., since 2008
- Pazardzhik, Bulgaria, since 2011
- Legnago, Italy, since 2011
- Dunavarsány, Hungary, since 2023

== Bibliography ==
- Salerno. Le guide ai sapori e ai piaceri, La Repubblica, Gedi, 2021 (with articles by Lucia Annunziata, Massimiliano e Doriana Fuksas, Franck Ribéry, Arturo Di Napoli, Peppe Barra, Andrea Di Maria, Vincenzo Boccia, Daniel Oren, Massimo Ghini, Diego De Silva, Benedetta Buccellato, Matteo Lorito, Corrado De Rosa, Alfonso Pecoraro Scanio, Rossella Gregorio, Yari Gugliucci, Dario Socci, Enrico Gallozzi, Vincenzo Dolce, Antonietta Di Martino, e Massimo de Divitiis). ISBN 9788883718588
- Bonfanti, Giuseppe. Dalla Svolta di Salerno al 18 aprile 1948. Editrice La Scuola. Brescia 1979.
- Crisci, Generoso. Salerno sacra:ricerca storica. Edizioni della Curia arcivescovile. Salerno 1962.
- D'Episcopo, Francesco. Salerno. Sulla scia di Alfonso Gatto. Masuccio e l'Ottocento salernitano. Editrice Il Sapere. Ancona 2004.
- De Renzi, Salvatore. Storia documentata della Scuola Medica di Salerno. Tipografie Gaetano Nobile. Naples, 1857.
- Di Martino, Maristella. Le Ricette di Salerno. La cultura gastronomica della città. Editore Il Raggio di Luna. Salerno 2006.
- Errico, Ernesto. Cinquant'anni fa a Salerno. Ripostes Editore. Salerno 2004.
- Felici, Maria. Palazzi nobiliari a Salerno. Edizioni La Veglia. Salerno 1996.
- Fonzo, Erminio, Partiti ed elezioni in provincia di Salerno nella crisi dello Stato liberale (1919–1923) in Rassegna storica lucana, nn. 49–50, 2011, pp. 43–113.
- Fonzo, Erminio, Il fascismo conformista. Le origini del regime nella provincia di Salerno (1920–1926), Edizioni del Paguro, Mercato San Severino (SA), 2011.
- Giordano, Gaetano. Il Profeta della Grande Salerno. Cento anni di storia meridionale nei ricordi di Alfonso Menna. Avagliano Editore. Salerno 1999.
- Iannizzaro, Vincenzo. Salerno. La Cinta Muraria dai Romani agli Spagnoli. Editore Elea Press. Salerno 1999.
- Iovino, Giorgia. Riqualificazione urbana e sviluppo locale a Salerno. Attori, strumenti e risorse di una città in trasformazione. Edizioni Scientifiche Italiane. Naples, 2002.
- Mazzetti, Massimo. Salerno Capitale d'Italia. Edizioni del Paguro. Salerno 2000.
- Musi, Aurelio. Salerno moderna. Editore Avagliano. Salerno 1999.
- Ferraiolo Marco Storia di un anno di anni fa – Racconti di vita salernitana degli anni 60–70 . Edizioni Ripostes . Salerno 2005
- Roma, Adelia. I giardini di Salerno. Editore Elea Press. Salerno 1997.
- Seton-Watson, Christopher. Italy from Liberalism to Fascism, 1870–1925. John Murray Publishers. London, 1967.

== See also ==
- List of princes of Salerno
- Principality of Salerno
- Schola Medica Salernitana
- Salerno Ivories
- Salerno railway station
- University of Salerno
- U.S. Salernitana 1919
- Operation Avalanche
- Salerno Cathedral
