= Halásztelek FC =

Hungarian football club

Halásztelek Fc
- Full name: Halásztelek Football Club
- Nickname(s): Tevék (Camels)
- Founded: 1961
- Ground: Németh Ferenc Sportcentrum; Halásztelek
- Capacity: 500
- Chairman: Gábor Lázár
- Head Coach: Gábor Békési
- League: Hungarian County League
- 8th
| Home colours | Away colours |

Halásztelek FC is a Hungarian Football Club from Pest County.

Halásztelek FC ( beforehand: Halásztelki Közösségi Sportkör) was established in 1961. The club takes part in the Hungarian county championship. The biggest success was in 1995 when the team won this Championship.

The most famous manager of the Team is Laszlo Repasi. He works with the U-15 Team. Here has worked the also famous manager László Kovács. He went to the Arabian Team Al-Salmiya SC.

== Notable former managers ==
- László Kovács
- Laszlo Repasi
- Ferenc Németh
- Németh Ferenc "Fecsó"
- Gábor Békési
