= Dunaharaszti =

- Town
- Flag Coat of arms

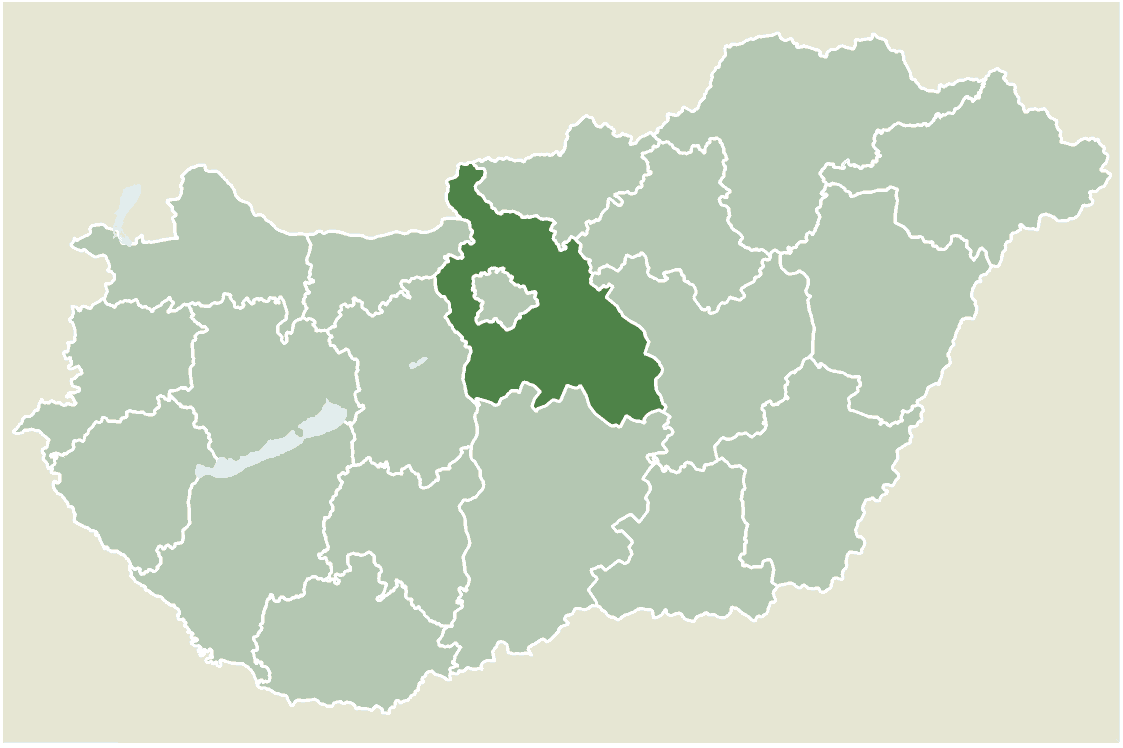
- Location of Pest county in Hungary

- Location of Dunaharaszti
- Coordinates: 47.35391°N 19.09481°E
- Country: Hungary
- County: Pest
- District: Szigetszentmiklós

Area
  - Total: 29.17 km^{2} (11.26 sq mi)

Population (2010)
  - Total: 20,112
  - Density: 689.5/km^{2} (1,786/sq mi)
- Time zone: UTC+1 (CET)
  - Summer (DST): UTC+2 (CEST)
- Postal code: 2330
- Area code: (+36) 24
- Website: www.dunaharaszti.hu

Dunaharaszti (German: Harast) is a town in Pest County, Budapest metropolitan area, Hungary. It has a population of around 20,000 people.

== Twin towns – sister cities ==
Dunaharaszti is twinned with:

- Altdorf bei Nürnberg, Germany

== Sport ==
- Dunaharaszti MTK, association football club

== Notable people ==
- Sunny Lax, trance music producer

== Gallery ==
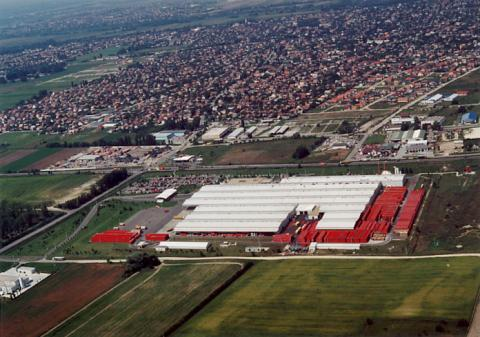
Aerial view with the Coca-Cola factory
