= Szigethalom =

- Town
- Flag Coat of arms

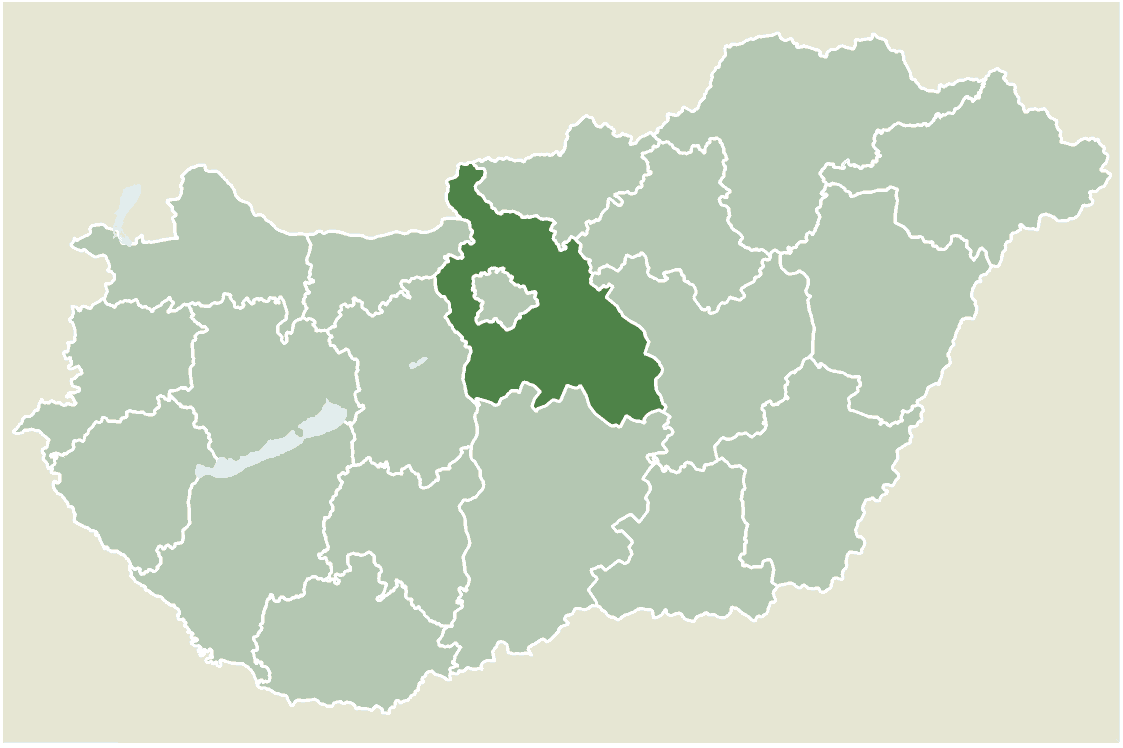
- Location of Pest county in Hungary

- Location of Szigethalom
- Coordinates: 47.31539°N 19.00775°E
- Country: Hungary
- County: Pest

Area
  - Total: 9.12 km^{2} (3.52 sq mi)

Population (2004)
  - Total: 13,745
  - Density: 1,507.12/km^{2} (3,903.4/sq mi)
- Time zone: UTC+1 (CET)
  - Summer (DST): UTC+2 (CEST)
- Postal code: 2315
- Area code: 24
- Website: https://szigethalom.asp.lgov.hu/

Szigethalom is a town in Pest county, Hungary. In reference to the 2022 census, the population of the town was at 17,644, with the female being at 9,060 while the male were at 8,584.

== Twin towns – sister cities ==
Szigethalom is twinned with:

- Fiľakovo, Slovakia
- Jaworzno, Poland
- Söderhamn, Sweden
- Ivanovo, Russia
- Forchtenberg, Germany
- Lemvig, Denmark
- Cagliari, Italy
- Muttenz, Switzerland
- Găești, Romania
- Sodankylä, Finland
