= Tököl =

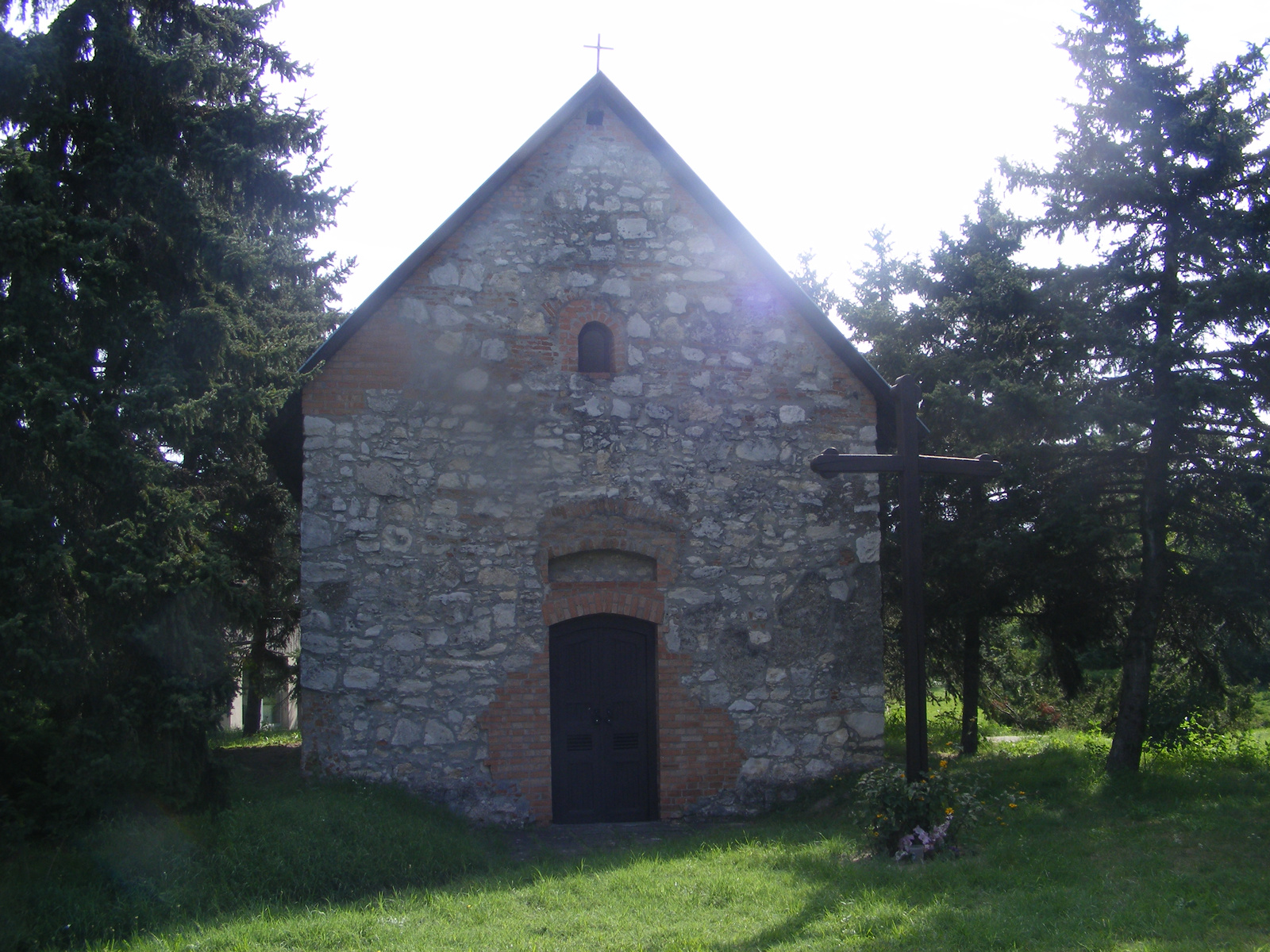
- The Chapel of St Anna

- Flag Coat of arms

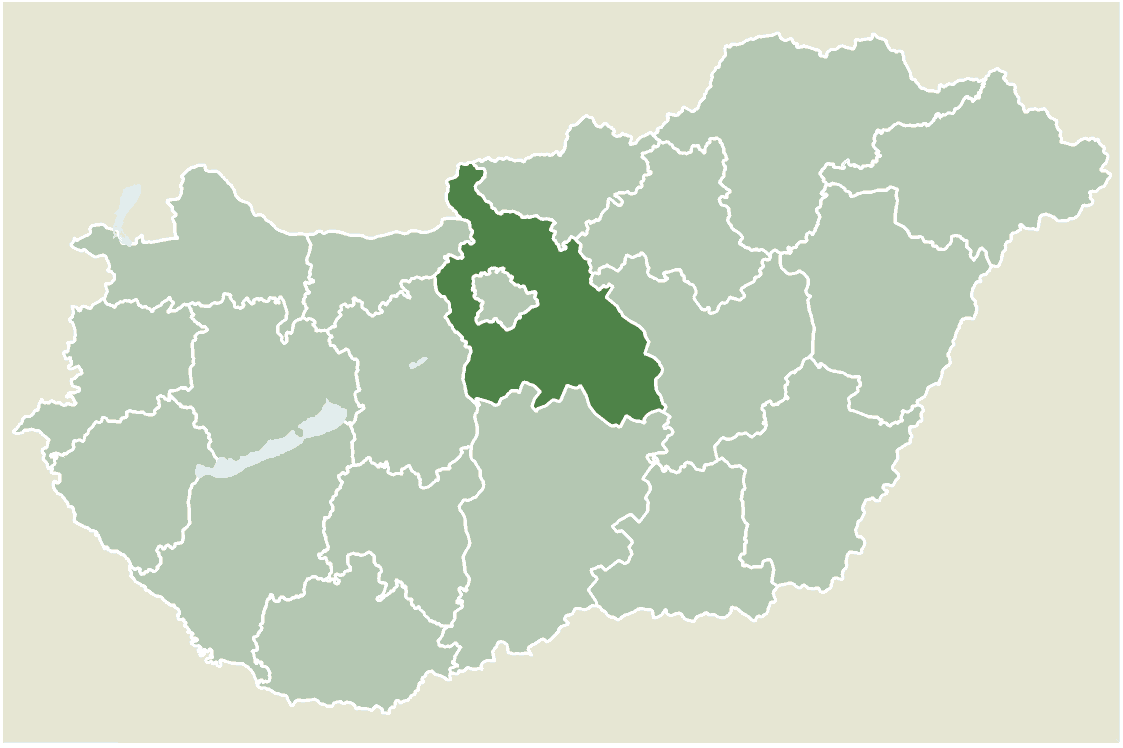

- Location of Tököl
- Coordinates: 47.32030°N 18.96711°E
- Country: Hungary
- County: Pest

Area
  - Total: 38.49 km^{2} (14.86 sq mi)

Population (2004)
  - Total: 9,337
  - Density: 242.58/km^{2} (628.3/sq mi)
- Time zone: UTC+1 (CET)
  - Summer (DST): UTC+2 (CEST)
- Postal code: 2316
- Area code: 24

Tököl (Croatian: Tukulja) is a town in Pest County, Hungary.

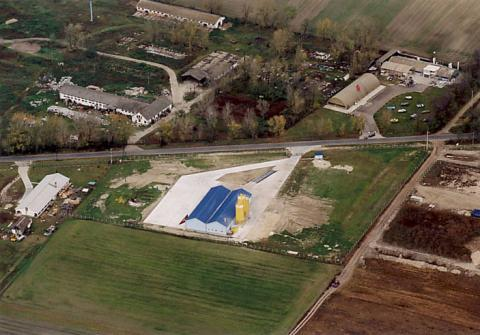
Aerial photography of Tököl

== Demography ==
The majority of residents are Hungarians, with a Croatian minority of Bunjevci or Raci.

== Hungarian Uprising ==
An Budapest-Tököl airfield (47 20 35 N / 18 59 20 E) was built during World War II, which was to become a Soviet military base. During the Hungarian Uprising, Pál Maléter, as Defence Minister for the Imre Nagy government, went to negotiate with the Soviet military presence and was arrested during the negotiations.

In 1952, the 24th and 25th fighter regiments of the Hungarian Air Force settled at the Tököl airport. In 1953, on October 1, the Tököl air base of the Hungarian People's Army was established. That same year, the aircraft repair company operating at the airport was separated from Csepel Autógyár National Vállalat and the Pestvidéki Machine Factory specializing in the repair of military aircraft was established. The overhauled aircraft were flown in at the Tököl airport. The factory continued to repair helicopters after the dissolution of the Warsaw Pact and the removal of Soviet forces from Hungary.

== Notable people ==
- Pál Hoffman (born 1948), politician and handball player, mayor of Tököl
- István Szilágyi (born 1950), handball player

== Twin towns – sister cities ==
Tököl is twinned with:

- Klein Rönnau, Germany

== Sport ==
- Tököli VSK: association football team
