= First Battle of Vác (1849) =

Battle in the Hungarian war of independence

Coordinates: 47°46′25.1″N 19°07′52.2″E

- Part of the Hungarian Revolution of 1848
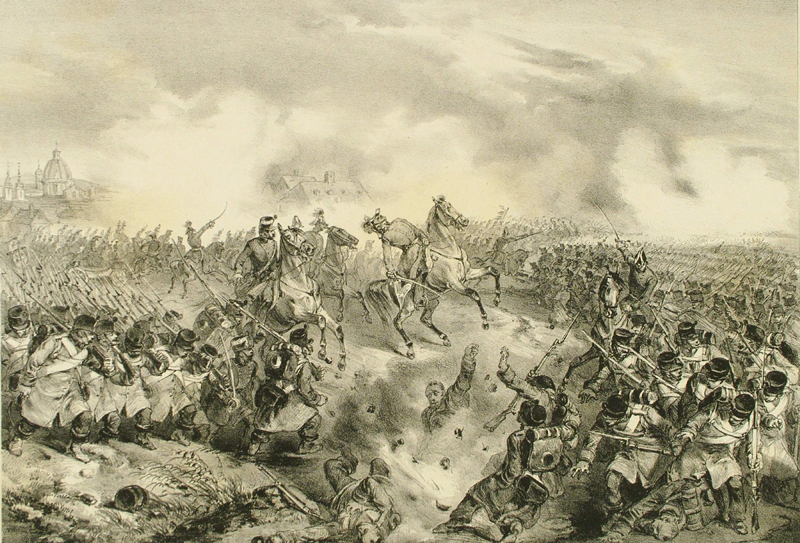
- The Battle of Vac
Date	10 April 1849
Location	Around and in Vác, Kingdom of Hungary
Result	Hungarian victory

Belligerents
Hungarian Revolutionary Army; Polish Legion	Austrian Empire

Commanders and leaders
János Damjanich	(Austrian Empire) Christian Götz (DOW)

Strength
11,592; 36 cannons Did not participate: Detached troops from I. corps: 2,973 men 20 cannons	8,250; 26 cannons

Casualties and losses
150	Total: 422; 60 dead 147 wounded 215 missing or captured 1 battery

The Battle of Vác, fought on 10 April 1849, was one of two important battles which took place in Vác during the Spring Campaign of the Hungarian War of Independence between the Austrian Empire and the Hungarian revolutionary army. The battle was the starting point of the second phase of the Spring Campaign, during which the Hungarians planned to relieve the fortress of Komárom from an Austrian siege, and to encircle the Austrian forces headquartered in the Hungarian capitals of Buda and Pest.

The Hungarians won the battle. The Austrian commander, Major General Christian Götz, was fatally wounded, dying shortly after the battle. His body was buried by the Hungarian commander Artúr Görgei with full military honors as a mark of respect.

== Background ==
With the Battle of Isaszeg the Hungarian Revolutionary Army led by Artúr Görgei managed to force the Austrian Habsburg Imperial Army led by Field Marshal Alfred I, Prince of Windisch-Grätz to retreat towards the Hungarian capitals of Pest and Buda. This liberated the Hungarian territories between the Tisza and the Danube rivers. The imperial troops took up a strong defensive line before Pest. The Hungarian commanders did not attempt to storm the position, but encircled Pest up to the Danube, and held in position until 9 April. The imperial army retreated to the capital.

On 7 April a new campaign plan was made. According to this plan the Hungarian army was to split; General Lajos Aulich with the Hungarian II Corps and Colonel Lajos Asbóth's division remained in front of Pest, demonstrating to make the imperials believe that the whole Hungarian army was there. This diverted their attention from the north, where the real Hungarian attack was to start with I, III and VII Corps moving west along the northern bank of the Danube to Komárom, to relieve it from the imperial siege. Kmety's division of VII Corps was to cover the three corps's march, and after I and III Corps occupied Vác, the division was to secure the town, while the rest of the troops together with the two remaining divisions of VII Corps were to advance to the Garam river, then head south to relieve the northern section of the Austrian siege of the fortress of Komárom. After this, they were to cross the Danube and relieve the southern section of the siege. If all this could be completed successfully, the imperials would have only two choices: to retreat from Middle Hungary towards Vienna, or be encircled in the Hungarian capitals by the Hungarians. This plan was very risky (as was the first plan of the Spring Campaign too) because if Windisch-Grätz had discovered that only one Hungarian corps remained in front of Pest, he could have destroyed Aulich's force, and thereby easily cut the lines of communication of the main Hungarian army, and even occupied Debrecen, the seat of the Hungarian Revolutionary Parliament and the National Defense Committee (interim government of Hungary), or he could encircle the three corps advancing to relieve Komárom. Although the president of the National Defense Committee (interim government of Hungary), Lajos Kossuth went to the Hungarian headquarters at Gödöllő, after the battle of Isaszeg and wanted a direct attack on Pest, he was finally convinced by Görgey that his and the other generals' plan was better. To secure the success of the Hungarian army, the National Defense Committee sent 100 wagons with munitions from Debrecen.

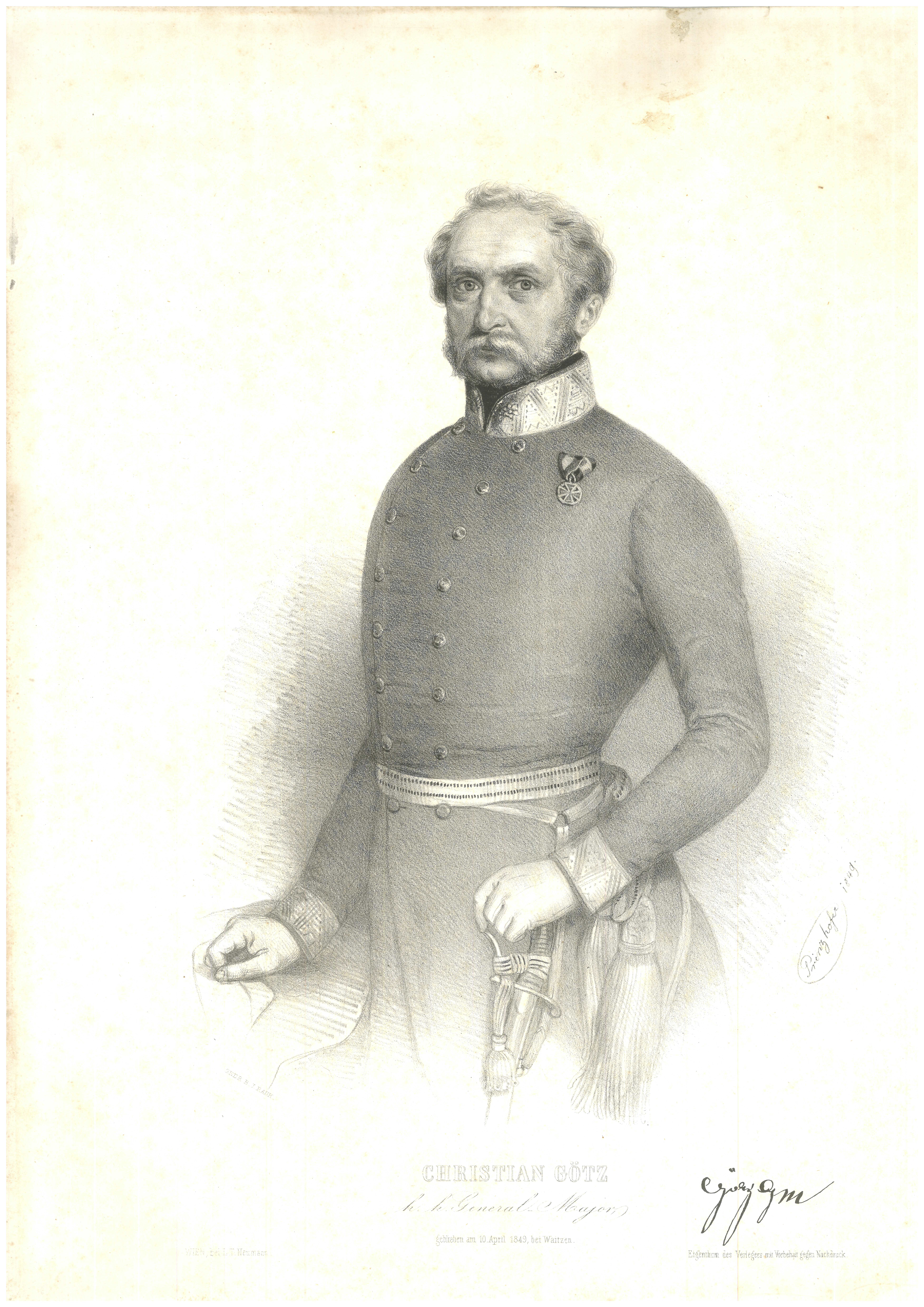
Götz, Christian (1783–1849)

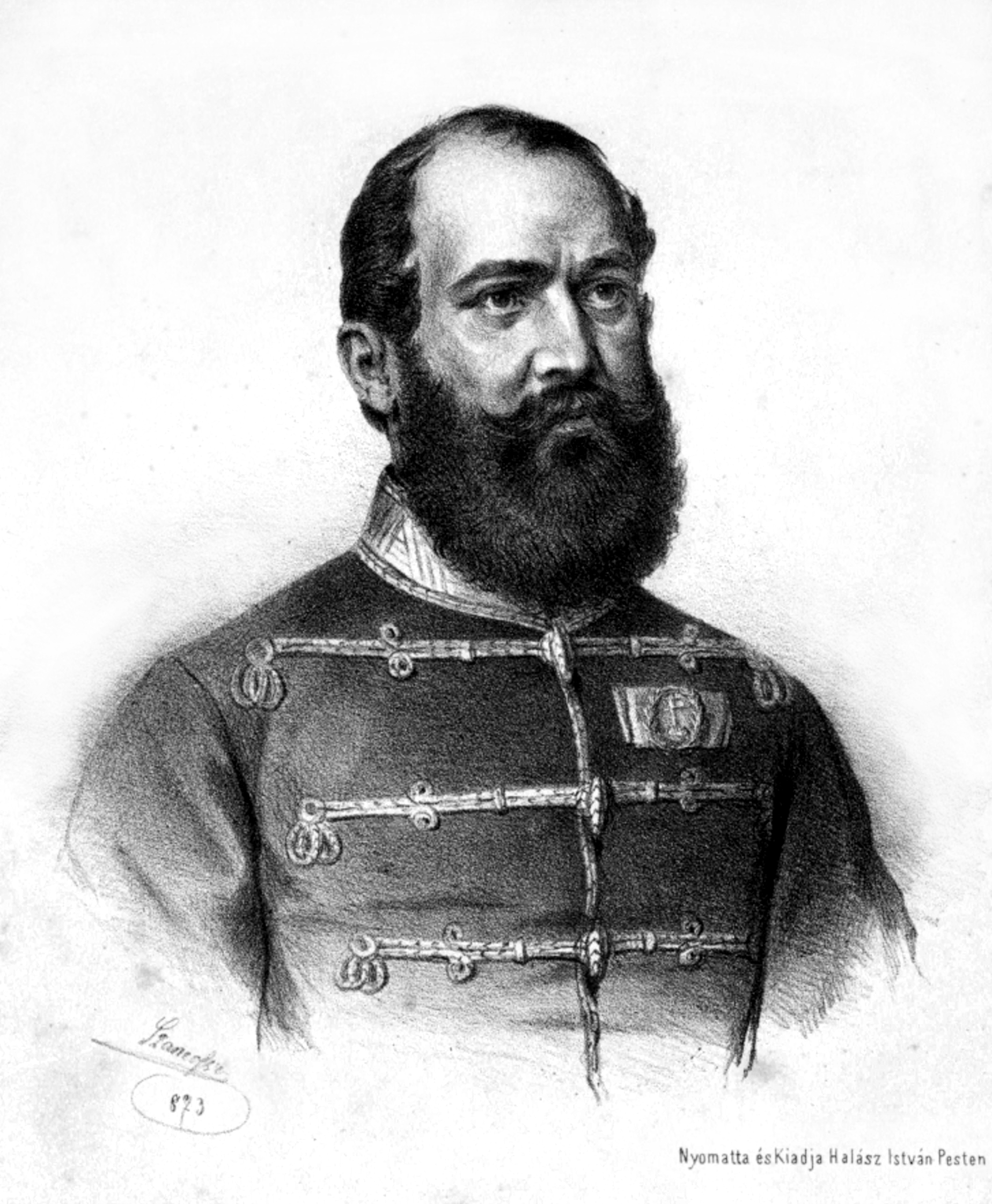
Damjanich János

After the Battle of Isaszeg, Field Marshal Windisch-Grätz ordered the division quartered in Balassagyarmat to defend the Ipoly valley, led by Lieutenant General Georg von Ramberg, to move to Vác, to secure the Danube Bend from a Hungarian attack. But at the same time he made the mistake of ordering Lieutenant General Anton Csorich, who actually was defending Vác with his division, to move to Pest. If two imperial divisions had been defending Vác when the Hungarians attacked, they would have had more chance of repelling them. On 10 April, when the Hungarian army planned to attack Vác, Görgey feared an imperial attack against his troops in the region before Pest. And indeed Windisch-Grätz ordered a general advance of his I and III Corps, to learn whether the Hungarian main army was in front of Pest or had moved northwards. But the Hungarian II Corps led by General Aulich, together with VII Corps and much of I Corps, easily repelled the attack. At the same time, the deceptive maneuvers by Aulich and Asbóth managed to attract the attention of the imperials, who did not notice the march of III Corps, led by János Damjanich. As a result, the field marshal was unable to obtain the information he needed. The inefficiency of the imperial reconnaissance is shown by the fact that on 12 and 14 April (4 days after the battle of Vác, when the main Hungarian army had already departed towards Komárom, and only II Corps remained there), Anton Csorich reported that Pest was in danger of being attacked by substantial Hungarian forces. Aulich and Asbóth's troops did their job of making the imperials believe that the main Hungarian army was still in front of the capital so well that neither Windisch-Grätz until his dismissal, nor Lieutenant Field Marshal Josip Jelačić (interim commander until the arrival of Feldzeugmeister Ludwig von Welden who was named as the new commander-in-chief), dared to do anything. In contrast, the Hungarian reconnaissance was excellent, learning that Windisch-Grätz was still before Pest with three army corps awaiting the Hungarian attack, and that Ramberg's division, composed of the Götz and Jablonowski brigades, was at Vác blocking the road to the Danube valley and to the Vág river.

== Prelude ==
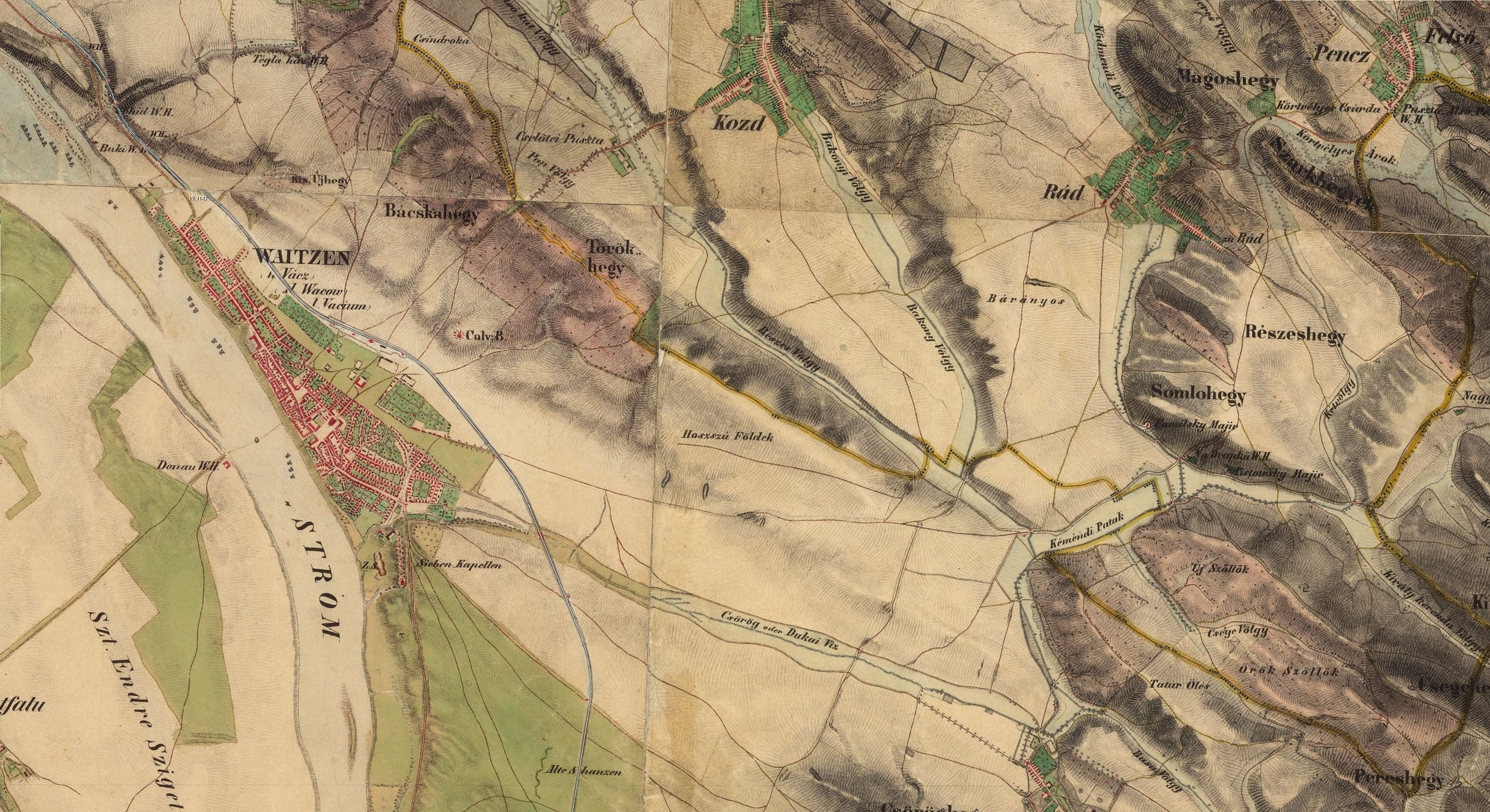
Contemporary map of the territory where the Battle of Vác (10 April 1849) took place, and its surroundings, where the military movements took place

Because of the participation of the VII Corps and much of the, I Corps in the skirmishes around Pest, the Hungarian army which moved towards Vác was composed only of the III Corps and Lieutenant-Colonel János Bobich's brigade of I Corps. Although it was designed by Damjanich as reserve in the forthcoming battle, the rest of the I Corps remained far behind, arriving at Vác only after the end of the battle. According to László Pusztaszeri (in 1984) the whole Hungarian I Corps joined the advance of the III Corps towards Vác, but this is unlikely. The military historian Róbert Hermann, writing 20 years later (2004) states that only Bobich's brigade accompanied III Corps towards Vác. They started to move north at 4 p.m. on 9 April, followed by VII Corps, which was extracted bit by bit from among the Hungarian forces performing the demonstrations.

On the morning of 10 April, after his troops arrived at Vác, General Damjanich sent Bobich's brigade of 2,973 men and 20 cannons through Rád and Kosd to encircle the imperial troops from Vác. But Bobich's infantry lost their way in the fog and moved towards Penc (east instead of west), so his troops failed to appear in the battle. When an aide-de-camp sent after Lieutenant Colonel János Bobich, found him, and his brigade finally arrived in Vác, the battle was already over. At the last moment before the battle the imperial commander, Georg von Ramberg, fell ill, so Major General Christian Götz took command. Windisch-Grätz had advised him to retreat west to the Garam (in Slovakian Hron) river without a fight if he faced superior numbers. Sensing that the Hungarian attack is imminent, the high commander also ordered him to send quickly his sick soldiers and the army's luggage to Esztergom. Götz received Windisch-Grätz's order on 10 April at 8 a.m., but he was not fully agreed with the order of retreat behind the Garam, writing back to him that the Szentendre island must be protected because the Hungarians can use it to cross on the right bank of the Danube. He was not expecting any Hungarian attack on that day.

Götz's men had not fought since the middle of February, being kept busy moving hither and thither in northern Hungary, in this aspect the battle-hardened Hungarian troops had the advantage.

=== Opposing forces ===
The Hungarians:

- III. corps:

1. Knezich infantry division:

- Kiss infantry brigade: 1. battalion of the 34. infantry regiment, 3. battalion of the 34. infantry regiment, 3. battalion of the 52. infantry regiment;
- Kökényessy infantry brigade: 9. battalion, 65. battalion, 1/2 infantry battery, 1/2 jäger battalion, 1/2 sapper battalion with 1 military bridge set;
- Pikéty column: 2. hussar regiment (8 companies).

2. Wysocki infantry division:

- Czillich infantry brigade: 3. battalion of the 60. infantry regiment, 42. battalion, Polish Legion;
- Leiningen infantry brigade: 3. battalion of the 19. infantry regiment, 3. battalion;
- Kászonyi cavalry brigade: 3. hussar regiment (6 companies), 2 Polish uhlan companies;

- 3 six-pounder batteries, 1 twelve-pounder battery.

In total: 10 infantry battalions, 2 jäger companies, 16 cavalry companies, 2 sapper companies, and 4 batteries.

The Austrians:

Ramberg division:

- Götz infantry brigade: 3. battalion of the 63. Bianchi infantry regiment, 1. battalion of the 36. Palombini infantry regiment, 12. kaiserjäger battalion, 2 1/2 companies of the 3. Archduke Karl Ludwig uhlan regiment, 1/2 cavalry battery, 1 1/2 Congreve rocket battery, 1 twelve-pounder infantry battery;
- Jablonowski infantry brigade: 1. battalion of the 15. Adolf Duke of Nassau infantry regiment, 2 battalion of the 15. Adolf Duke of Nassau infantry regiment, 3. battalion of the 15. Adolf Duke of Nassau infantry regiment, 4. (Landwehr) battalion of the 15. Adolf Duke of Nassau infantry regiment, 2 companies of the 6. Wrbna chevau-léger regiment, 2 companies of the 1. Archduke John dragoon regiment, 1 company of the 7. Kress chevau-léger regiment, 1 sapper company, 1 six-pounder battery, 1 1/2 Congreve rocket battery, 1 twelve-pounder infantry battery;

In total: 7 infantry battalions (7500 soldiers), 7 1/2 cavalry companies (750 cavalrymen), 1 sapper company, 4 batteries (27 cannons).

== Battle ==
On a rainy 10 April, Damjanich positioned his troops south from Vác around 9 o'clock, after moving along the Pest-Vác road, because on that morning the fields were impassable due to wet weather. The Hungarian general positioned his troops as it follows: the Wysocki division (with the Czillich brigade in the first and the Leiningen brigade in the second line) deployed along the Dunakeszi-Vác road having the Danube on their left side, the division led by Colonel Károly Knezić (with the Kiss brigade in the first and the Kökényessy brigade in the second line) formed the right wing, along the railroad, while the cavalry division led by General József Nagysándor remained as the third line. Damjanich deployed the whole artillery of his III. corps on the sand dunes near the railroad. At 9.30 a.m. lieutenant colonel Althann the leader of the Austrian wanguard reported to Götz the approaching of enemy troops from South, so the Austrian commander, together with General Felix Jablonowski, the commander of his second brigade, rode to the Austrian outposts. The road which led to Vác from South crossed the stone bridge (called also the bridge with statues, because of the statues on them, representing 7 saints) over the Gombás creek, while East from the town was another bridge for the Vác-Pest railway. Götz positioned the soldiers of the 15. Infantry Regiment from to the Jablonowski brigade in front of the entrance of the town as it follows. Near the Danube's shore on the Gallows hill (Akasztófadomb) placed the 3. battalion, on the Seven Chapels hill (Hétkápolna domb) the 2. battalion, while on the railway bridge the 1. battalion. He sent the 12. kaiserjäger battalion to guard the graveyards in front of the stone bridge.

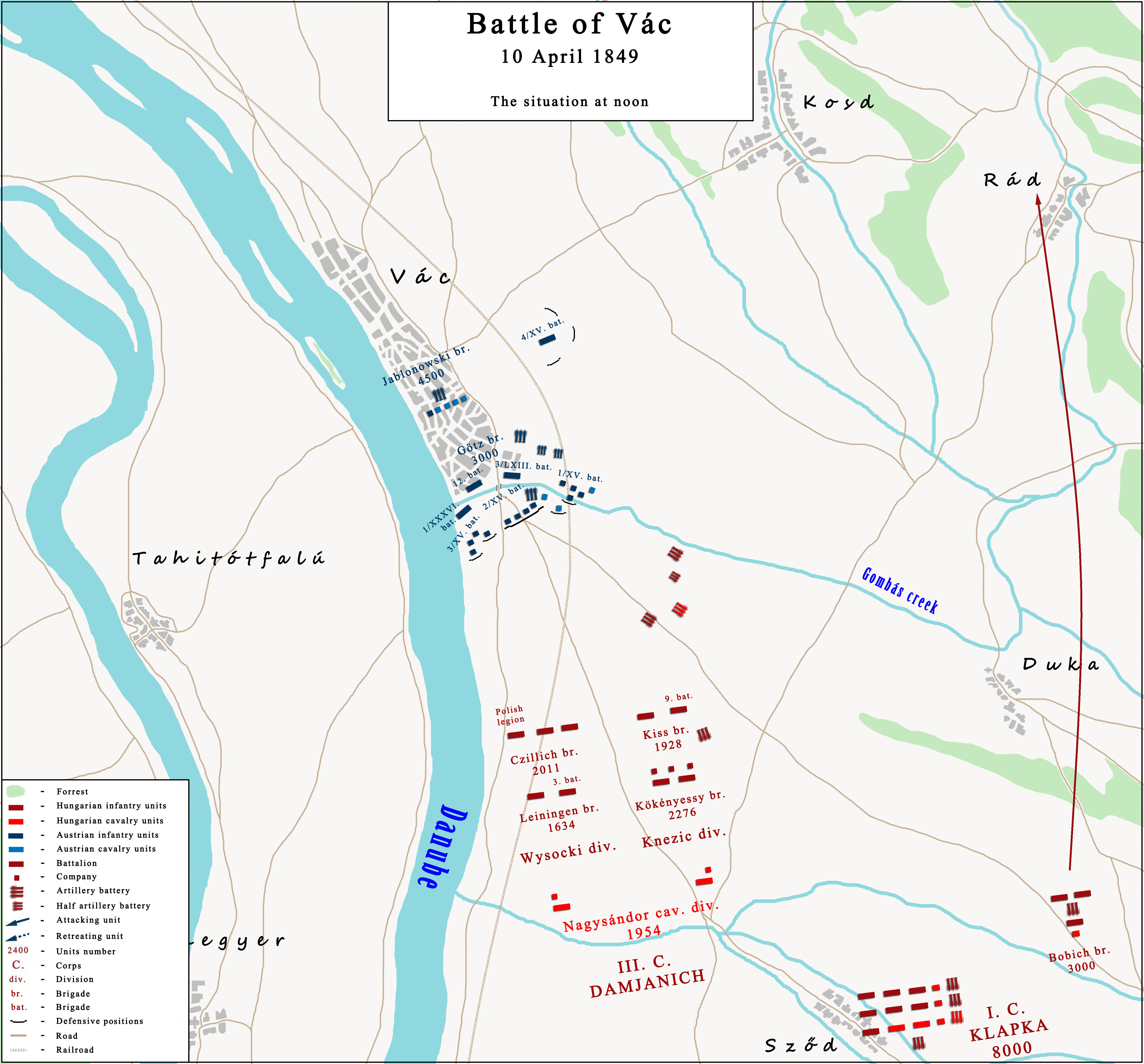
The first battle of Vác (1849). The situation at noon

Götz placed a 6-pounder, a half 12-pounder cannon battery and a half rocket battery between Vác and the railroad bridge. The 4. battalion of the 15. infantry regiment, under Colonel Strasdil was positioned on the Calvary hill (Kálváriadomb), in order to protect Vác from an eventual attack from East. The other Austrian units (the 1. battalion of the 63. infantry regiment, the 3. battalion of the 36. infantry regiment, 2 1/2 company of the 2. chevau-léger regiment, a company of the 1. dragoon regiment, a sapper company, a 6-pounder battery, a 12-pounder battery, a rocket battery) were gathering in Vác.

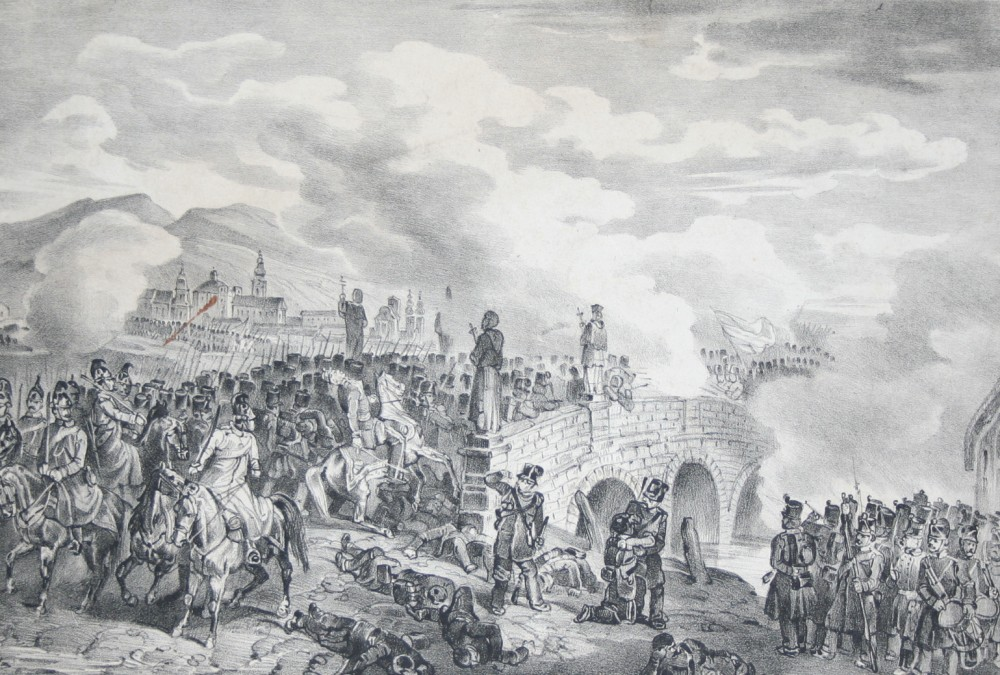
The fighting around the bridge in the Battle of Vác on 10 April 1849

At this moment Götz was unaware of a serious Hungarian attack, thinking it was a numerically inferior force making a demonstration. The battle started with an artillery duel, which lasted several hours. Damjanich deployed Czillich's and Leiningen's brigades on the left wing, and Kiss's and Kökényessy's on the right. He was waiting for Bobich to complete the encirclement of the imperial troops, but in vain. In the meanwhile Götz realized that he faced a numerically superior army, and at 3 o'clock in the afternoon, decided to start his retreat from the town. He ordered to Jablonowski to withdraw from the city with his brigade and a part of his brigade (the 2., 3., 4. battalions of the XV infantry regiment, the cavalry and the majority of the artillery) to the Cigány hill in front of Verőce, but he wanted to hold the bridge until his troops were far enough from the Hungarians to be safe. Götz himself decided to cover his troops retreat with the 12. kaiserjägers battalion and the 3. battalion of the LXIII infantry regiment, while the 1. battalion of the XV. infantry regiment was kept behind them as reserve. The 12. battalions soldiers occupied the row of buildings from the southern end of Vác, facing the Gombás creek and the stone bridge with the statues, while the 3/LXIIII battalion, organized in company columns was positioned behind the bridge. Götz, who was among the latter, wanted to protect the bridge until his last units retreated from Vác.

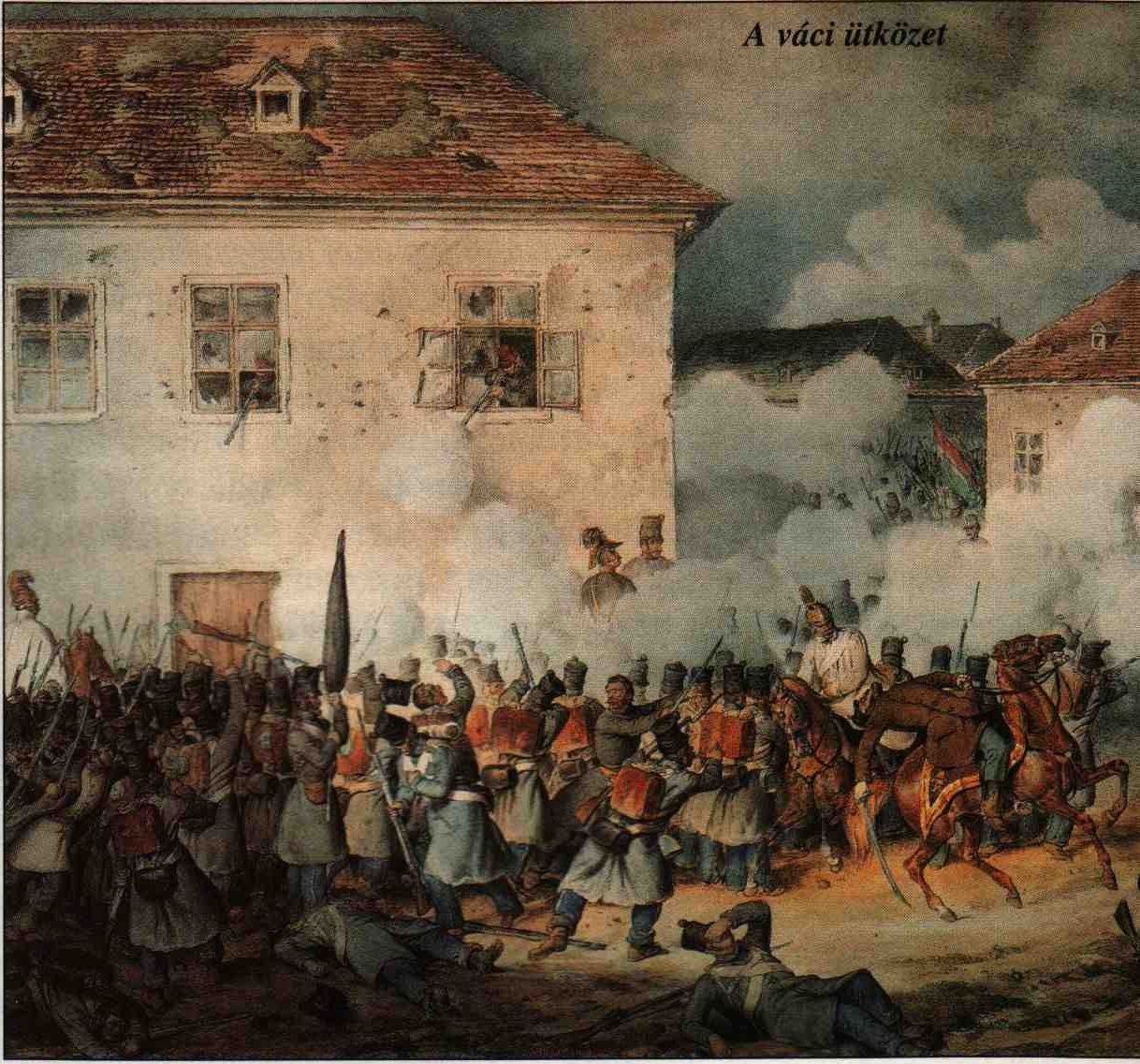
The wounding of Christian Götz in the Battle of Vác, 10 April 1849

Unaware of the fact that the Bobich brigade lost its way, around 3 p.m. Damjanich was still waiting for the signal from them (a cannon shot), showing that they reached the Naszály mountain behind Vác, in order to start the attack. He sent his troops to approach 1500 paces from the enemy lines, but he still did not gave the order to attack, waiting for Bobich's gun shot. In the same time his troops, which waited for four hours in the pouring rain, started to run out of patience, as well as Damjanich, who finally ordered Wysocki's Polish Legion to charge the bridge, while his artillery fired incessantly. Because the retreat of Jablonowski's brigade, the Austrian cannons stopped to fire for a while, which made the Hungarian artillerymen to realize the enemies real intentions, so they concentrated their shootings on the stone bridge. Götz saw his troops start to retreat from in front of the bridge because of the huge pressure from the Hungarians. He rode forward, yelling: "Advance, do not retreat!" In that moment he was hit by a shell splinter in his forehead, while his horse was taken down by at least ten bullets. (Note: According to József Bánlaky Götz was wounded towards the end of the battle when he, leading the 12. kaiserjäger and the Bianchi battalions tried to cover the retreat of the last Austrian troops from Vác.) The Austrian soldiers caught him as he fell, and took their wounded commander to the military boarding school in Vác.

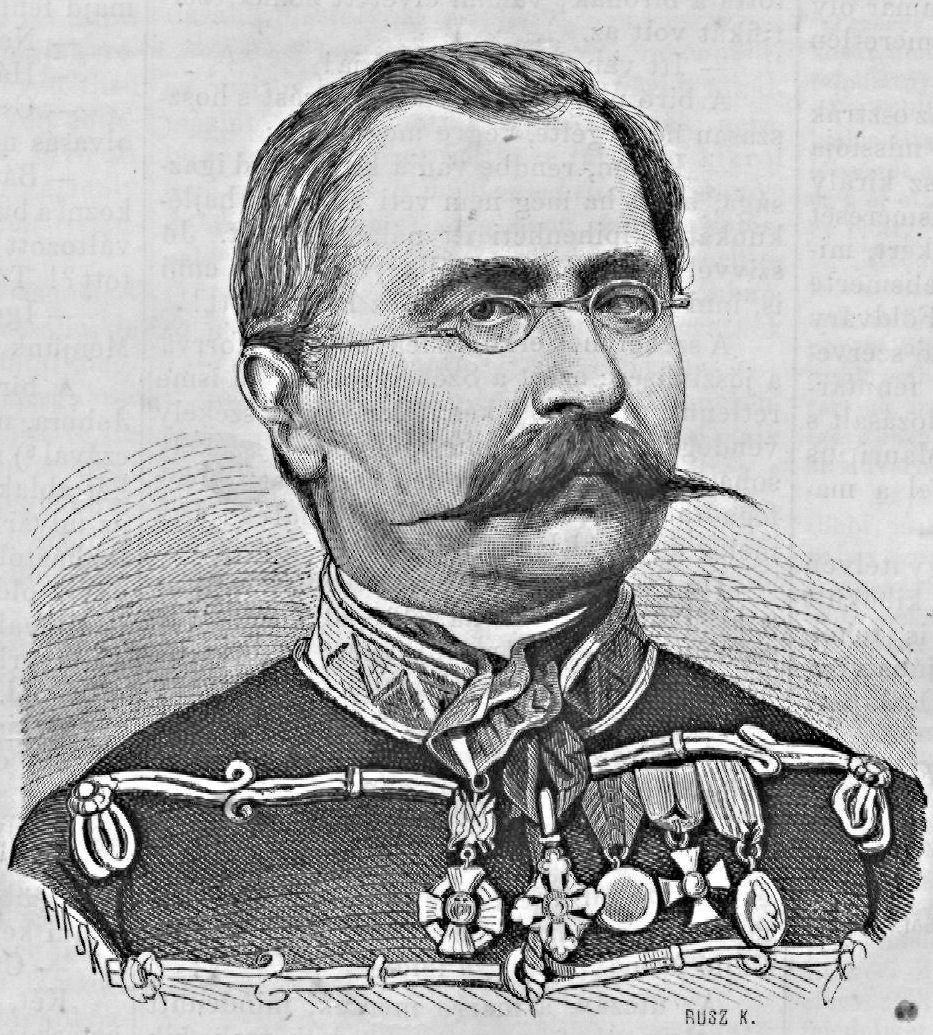
Földváry Károly VU

Wysocki's division charged three times the stone bridge, but their repeated attacks crumbled under the fire of the 12. imperial kaiserjägers. The rout of the Polish Legion caused also the other battalions, which were following them, to retreat. After its failure, the 3rd (called the "White Feathered Battalion") battalion, led by the hero of several battles, lieutenant colonel Károly Földváry, came up from the 7 Chapes hill to attack the bridge, but they were pushed back by the retreat of the Polish Legion. The Austrian 3/LXIIII battalion, noticing this confusion among the enemy troops, started a counter-attack, occupying the bridge.

Then came to the scene the commander of the 3rd battalion, Major Károly Földváry, the hero of the Battle of Tápióbicske, with the banner of his battalion in his hand. He went to the standard-bearer of the Polish Legion, and wanted to take the flag of them in his hand, wanting to lead both the 3. battalion and the Polish soldiers to attack against the Austrians, but the standard-bearer resisted, saying: Wont attack, let the Hungarians go to attack. The Polish standard bearer was probably afraid that he will be executed if he lets the flag of his unit to be taken by somebody from another unit, as it happened to the standard-bearer of the 9. battalion when the same Földváry took their flag in his hand in the battle of Tápióbicske. Földváry then went to Knezić's division's 9. battalion, called the "Red Hatted" battalion, which together with his 3. "white feathered" battalion, were regarded as the bravest battalions of Damjanich's III. corps, and led them to attack against the bridge. Here fierce hand-to-hand combat ensued with the Austrian 3/LXIIII battalion, as the result of which the Austrians were pushed back, the Hungarians taking half of the bridge. Then Földváry took the flag of his battalion and rode onto the bridge with it, followed by the 3. and 9. battalions, under a hail of bullets from the 3/LXIIII battalion and the 12. kaiserjäger battalion. Földváry's horse was shot dead in seconds, as a result of which the Hungarian battalions stopped, fearing that their leader was killed, but he went back to his soldiers, took another horse and rode up the bridge again, and the same thing happened: the second horse fell down beneath him in a second, but he remained unharmed.

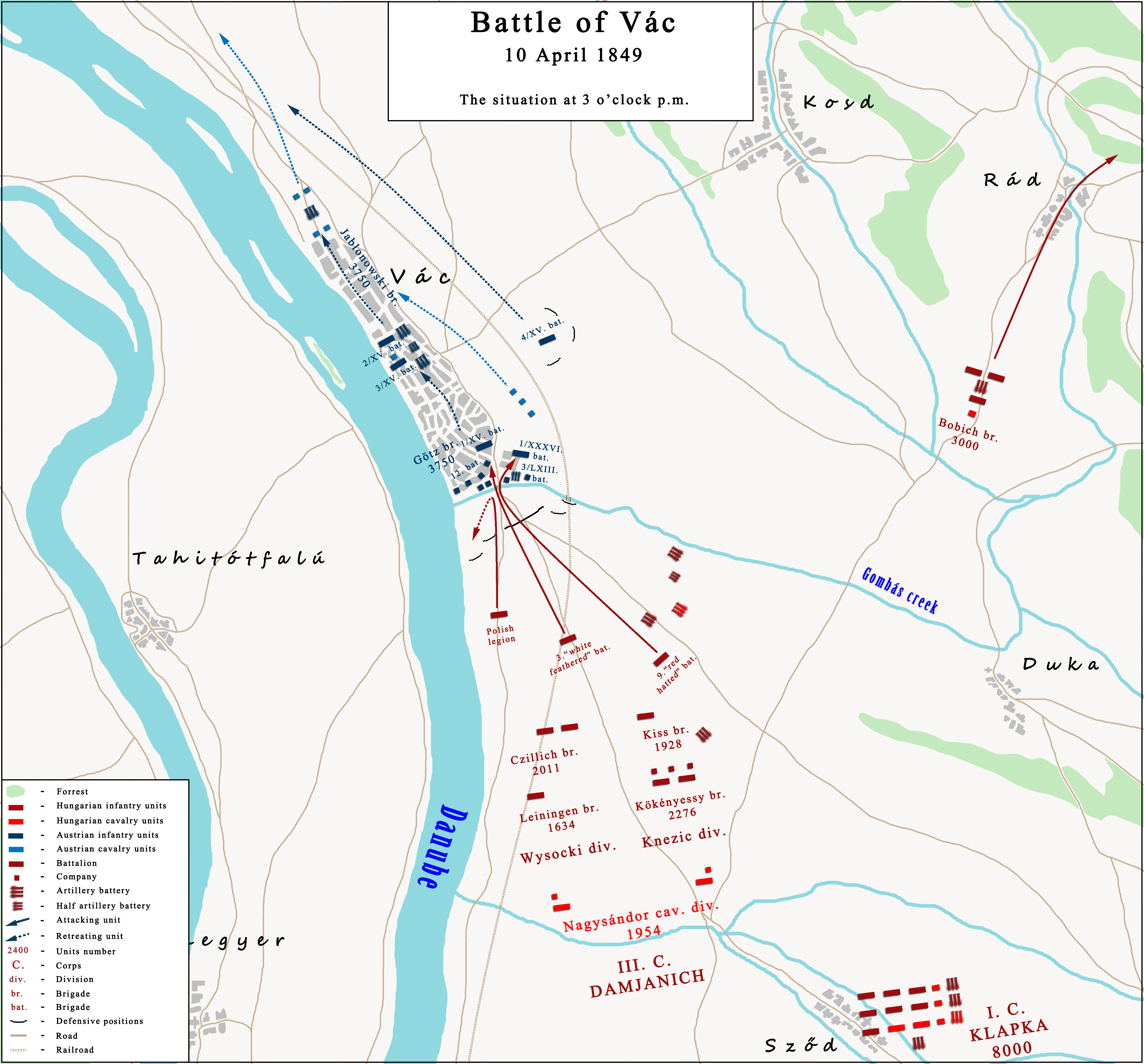
The first battle of Vác (1849). The situation after 3 p.m

At that moment the imperial officer who was ordering the volleys was so astonished by this recklessness that he forgot to tell his soldiers to shoot, and profiting from this opportunity, the men of the 9th battalions attack, led, this time on foot, by the same Földváry, and their captain Pál Kiss, and in a harsh bayonet fight, they swept away the Austrian resistance. After that the other Hungarian battalions also crossed the bridge, and in heavy street fighting, as a result of which captain Friedrich Brandenstein the commander of the 12. kaiserjäger battalion fell prisoner, and captain Ferdinand Billinek, the commander of the 3/LXIIII battalion was wounded, and pushed the imperials into the streets of the city. Despite the fact that the 1. battalion of the 1/XV Austrian battalion from the reserve came to the aid of the retreating two battalions, they could not stop the Hungarian advance. At the same time, the Austrian were pushed back also at the railroad embankment, so they were forced to continue their resistance inside the city. During this street fighting the Hungarians reached the building of the military boarding school where the wounded Götz lay, defended by the Bianchi infantry regiment. The Hungarians occupied it after heavy fighting, and found the Austrian commander inside, taking him prisoner along with many enemy soldiers. The imperial troops which fought by the railway embankment withstood for an hour after the Hungarians crossed the bridge, preventing an encirclement of the imperial troops from the east, then they also retreated in heavy fighting.

The imperial forces, now led by Major General Felix Jablonowski, retreated from Vác in heavy street fighting, heading towards Verőce, Jablonowski assuring their retreat from the Gypsy hill (Cigány hegy) lying 1500 paces distance from Kis Vác, from where they could easily hit the Hungarian troops which tried to pursue the retreating Austrians at the northwestern edge of the town. The Austrian commander deployed here two gun batteries, one of 12-pounders, the other of six-pounders, and a rocket battery, covered by some infantry, to support his troops' withdrawal. In order to cover his left flank, Jablonowski detached, under the leadership of Colonel Strasdil, 4 companies of the Landwehr battalion of the Nassau infantry regiment and 1 company of the Palombini regiment on some vineyards. Thanks to the support of the batteries led by Jablonowski, the Austrian units could retreat from Vác in relatively good order. The last units which retreated from Vác were the 12. kaiserjäger and the Bianchi battalions which resisted heroically against the Hungarian attacks in the graveyard and on the streets, but finally they had to pull back from the enormous pressure, suffering heavy losses. (Note: According to József Bánlaky then was Götz wounded, and fell captain Brandenstein prisoner.) But because of the effective fire of the Austrian batteries positioned on the Cigány hill, the Hungarian cavalry led by General József Nagysándor could not pursue the retreating Austrian troops, and, as mentioned before, the Bobich brigade sent to encircle the Austrians, had not appeared yet. In this situation Damjanich had no choice but to call off the pursuit of the Austrians, confining himself to an artillery duel with the enemy batteries. Understanding that the Hungarians will not pursue his troops, Jablonowski retreated to Verőce, where his artillery took a defensive position for a while, then continued the retreat through Nagymaros and Szob towards the Ipoly valley, arriving there on 11 April around 00.30 a.m., after crossing the Ipoly at Ipolyszalka, and burning the bridge. Colonel Strasdil's column, which had to cover, during the retreat, the Austrians from left, missed their way, joining Jablonowski's division only on 12 April at Kéménd, after a long march through Kóspallag, Márianosztra, Ipolytölgyes and Ganod.

== Aftermath ==
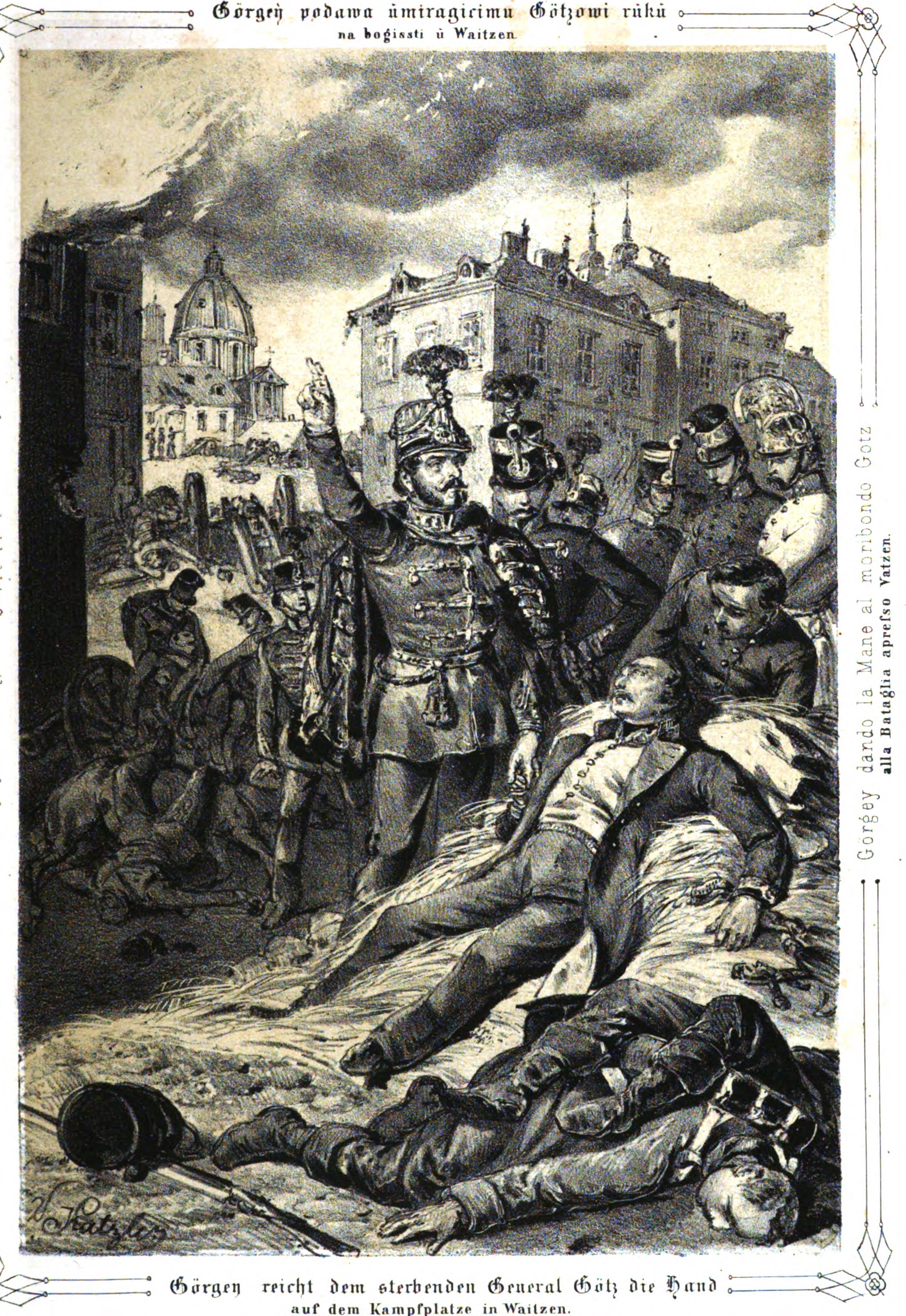
Görgey and Götz. Winzenz Katzler

One of the Polish Legion's medics took care of Götz's wounds. On 11 April Görgey arrived in Vác, and one of the first things he did was to visit Götz and ask how he was feeling. But because of his wound, Götz had lost his ability to talk, could not respond. His last wish was to be buried together with his ring. He received extreme unction from a Hungarian army chaplain, who prayed next to him until he died. Götz was buried on 12 April, his coffin being carried by Hungarian soldiers on their shoulders accompanied by military music and drumbeat, in front of the Hungarian soldiers and the Austrian prisoners. The coffin was lowered to the grave by three generals: Görgey, György Klapka, Damjanich and a staff officer. In 1850 Götz's widow showed gratitude for the care and respect paid to her husband by his enemies, by donating 2,000 forints to the military boarding school in which her husband had spent his last hours.

From a tactical point of view, although they had lost their commander, the imperial defeat was not heavy, and the army could retreat in good order. After the battle Damjanich was dissatisfied with the performance of some Hungarian commanders and units, believing that this battle could have been a more decisive victory. The irascible, impetuous general criticized the slowness of the cautious Klapka, who could have arrived at the battlefield in time if he had moved faster, and also General József Nagysándor, the commander of the cavalry, for the tardy pursuit of the enemy after the battle. He also wanted to decimate the Polish Legion because they ran away after the first attack, but Görgey arrived and prevented this. Damjanich was angry at the lack of exploitation of this victory, and of others before it in the Spring Campaign (Tápióbicske, Isaszeg), and he believed that the other commanders were responsible.

With the victory at Vác, the Hungarian army opened the way towards the Garam river. After the battle the imperial command in Pest continued to believe that the main Hungarian forces were still before the capital. This was because only one corps participated in the Battle of Vác, which made Windisch-Grätz think that the rest of the Hungarian army had not yet arrived in Pest. When he finally seemed to grasp what was really happening, he wanted to make a powerful attack on 14 April against the Hungarians at Pest, and then cross the Danube at Esztergom, cutting off the army which was marching towards Komárom. But his corps commanders, General Franz Schlik and Lieutenant Field Marshal Josip Jelačić, refused to obey, so his plan, which could have caused serious problems to the Hungarian armies, was not realized. To hold back the Hungarian advance to the west towards Komárom, Windisch-Grätz, sent an order to Lieutenant General Ludwig von Wohlgemuth to stop them with the reserve corps formed from imperial troops from Vienna, Styria, Bohemia and Moravia. These troops would suffer a heavy defeat on 19 April by the Hungarian army in the Battle of Nagysalló, and with that the Hungarians opened the way to besieged Komárom. But when these events took palace, Windisch-Grätz was no longer in Hungary, because in the meanwhile, on 12 April he was relieved of his command of the imperial troops in Hungary by the emperor Franz Joseph I of Austria. Feldzeugmeister Ludwig von Welden was appointed in his place.

== Sources ==
- Babucs, Zoltán (2022), ""Utánam fiúk, hiszen mienk ez a haza!" - A váci ütközet (1849. április 10.)", Magyarságkutató Intézet (in Hungarian), archived from the original on 7 August 2022
- Bánlaky, József (2001). A magyar nemzet hadtörténelme (The Military History of the Hungarian Nation XXI) (in Hungarian). Budapest: Arcanum Adatbázis.
- Bona, Gábor, "Honvédzászlók a szabadságharcban", Budai Honvédek (in Hungarian)
- Hermann, Róbert, ed. (1996). Az 1848–1849 évi forradalom és szabadságharc története ("The history of the Hungarian Revolution and War of Independence of 1848–1849) (in Hungarian). Budapest: Videopont. p. 464. ISBN 963-8218-20-7.
- Bóna, Gábor (1987). Tábornokok és törzstisztek a szabadságharcban 1848–49 ("Generals and Staff Officers in the War of Freedom 1848–1849") (in Hungarian). Budapest: Zrínyi Katonai Kiadó. p. 430. ISBN 963-326-343-3.
- Hermann, Róbert (2004). Az 1848–1849-es szabadságharc nagy csatái ("Great battles of the Hungarian Revolution of 1848–1849") (in Hungarian). Budapest: Zrínyi. p. 408. ISBN 963-327-367-6.
- Hermann, Róbert (2001). Az 1848–1849-es szabadságharc hadtörténete ("Military History of the Hungarian Revolution of 1848–1849") (in Hungarian). Budapest: Korona Kiadó. p. 424. ISBN 963-9376-21-3.
- Pusztaszeri, László (1984). Görgey Artúr a szabadságharcban ("Artúr Görgey in the War of Independence") (in Hungarian). Budapest: Magvető Könyvkiadó. p. 784. ISBN 963-14-0194-4.
- Rubint, Dezső (1925), "A váci ütközet 1849 ápr. 10-én" (PDF), Hadtörténelmi Közlemények (in Hungarian)
- Tragor, Ignác (1984). Vác története 1848-49-ben ("History of Vác in 1848–49") (in Hungarian). Vác: Váci Múzeum Egyesület. p. 544.
