= Szob District =

Coordinates: 47.8167°N 18.8667°E

Szob District Szobi járás
- Districts of Hungary
- Coat of arms

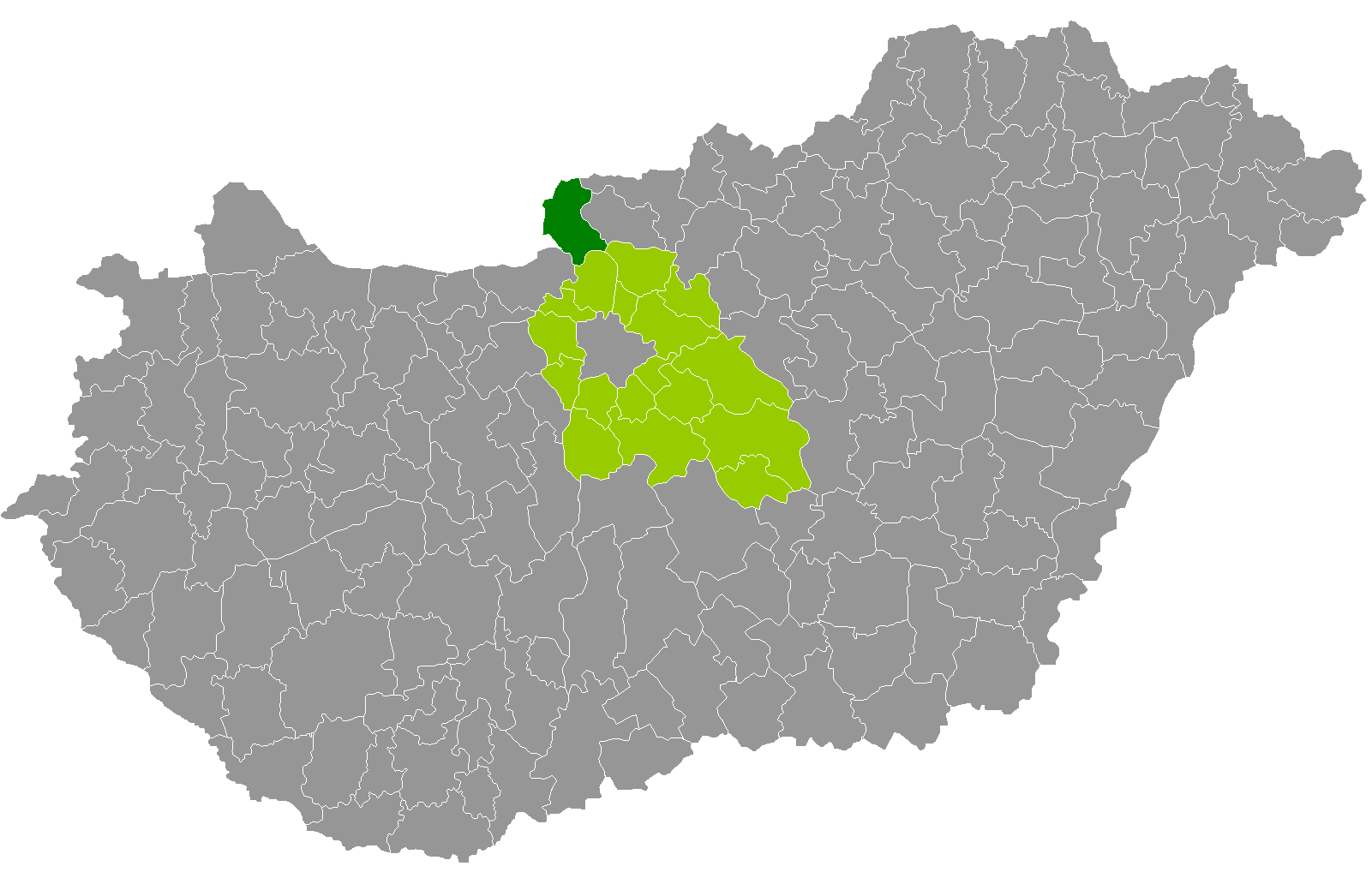
- Szob District within Hungary and Pest County.
- Country: Hungary
- County: Pest
- District seat: Szob

Area
  - Total: 438.32 km^{2} (169.24 sq mi)
  - Rank: 5th in Pest

Population (2011 census)
  - Total: 24,875
  - Rank: 18th in Pest
  - Density: 57/km^{2} (150/sq mi)

Szob (Hungarian: Szobi járás) is a district in northern part of Pest County. Szob is also the name of the town where the district seat is found. The district is located in the Central Hungary Statistical Region.

== Geography ==
Szob District borders with the Slovak Nitra Region to the north and west, Balassagyarmat District, Rétság District (Nógrád County) and Vác District to the east, Szentendre District to the south, Esztergom District (Komárom-Esztergom County) to the southwest. The number of the inhabited places in Szob District is 17.

== Municipalities ==
The district has two towns (bolded) and 15 villages.

- Bernecebaráti (904)
- Ipolydamásd (352)
- Ipolytölgyes (417)
- Kemence (990)
- Kismaros (2,093)
- Kóspallag (751)
- Letkés (1,119)
- Márianosztra (878)
- Nagybörzsöny (744)
- **Nagymaros** (4,756)
- Perőcsény (289)
- **Szob** (2,806) – district seat
- Szokolya (1,810)
- Tésa (78)
- Vámosmikola (1,644)
- Verőce (3,643)
- Zebegény (1,213)

== Demographics ==
Religion in Szob District (2011 census)
1. Catholic Church (53.5%)
2. Greek Catholicism (0.50%)
3. Calvinism (8.40%)
4. Lutheranism (1.60%)
5. Other religions (1.70%)
6. Non-religious (9.90%)
7. Atheists (1.00%)
8. Undeclared (23.4%)

In 2011, it had a population of 24,875 and the population density was 57/km².

Year	County population	Change
2011	24,875	n/a

=== Ethnicity ===
Besides the Hungarian majority, the main minorities are the German (approx. 900), Roma (500) and Slovak (100).

Total population (2011 census): 24,875
Ethnic groups (2011 census): Identified themselves: 23,598 persons:

- Hungarians: 21,716 (92.02%)
- Germans: 865 (3.67%)
- Gypsies: 515 (2.18%)
- Others and indefinable: 502 (2.13%)

Approx. 1,000 persons in Szob District did not declare their ethnic group at the 2011 census.

=== Religion ===
Religious adherence in the county according to 2011 census:

- Catholic – 13,439 (Roman Catholic – 13,316; Greek Catholic – 118);
- Reformed – 2,078;
- Evangelical – 405;
- other religions – 413;
- Non-religious – 2,456;
- Atheism – 258;
- Undeclared – 5,826.

== Gallery ==
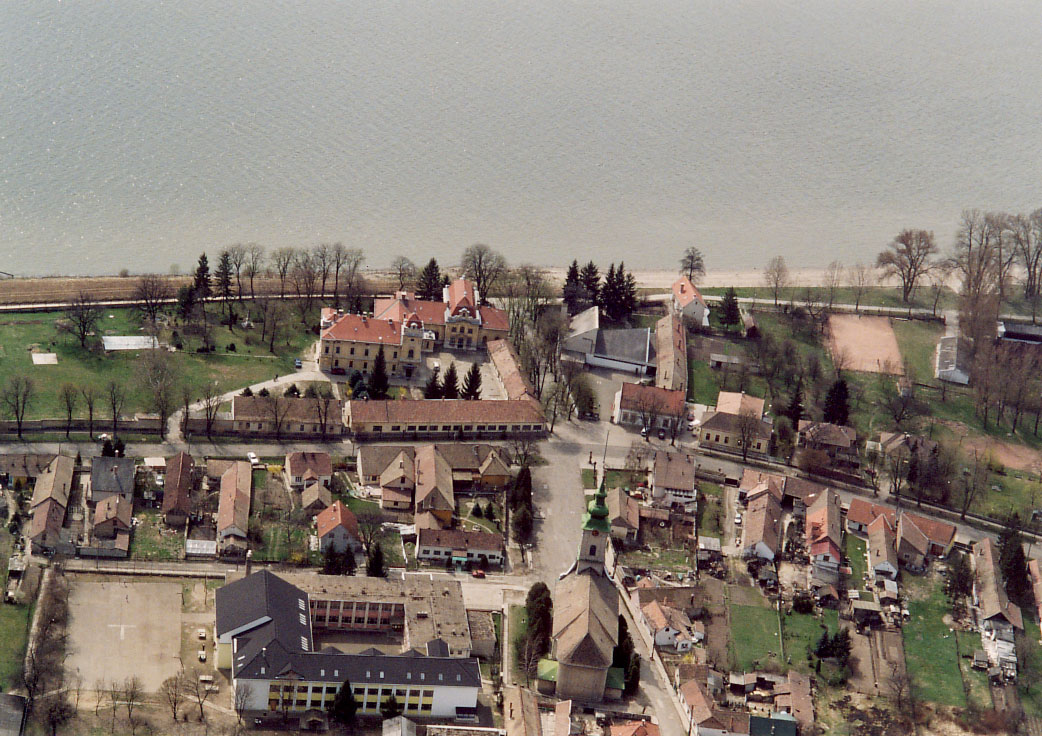
Downtown of Szob

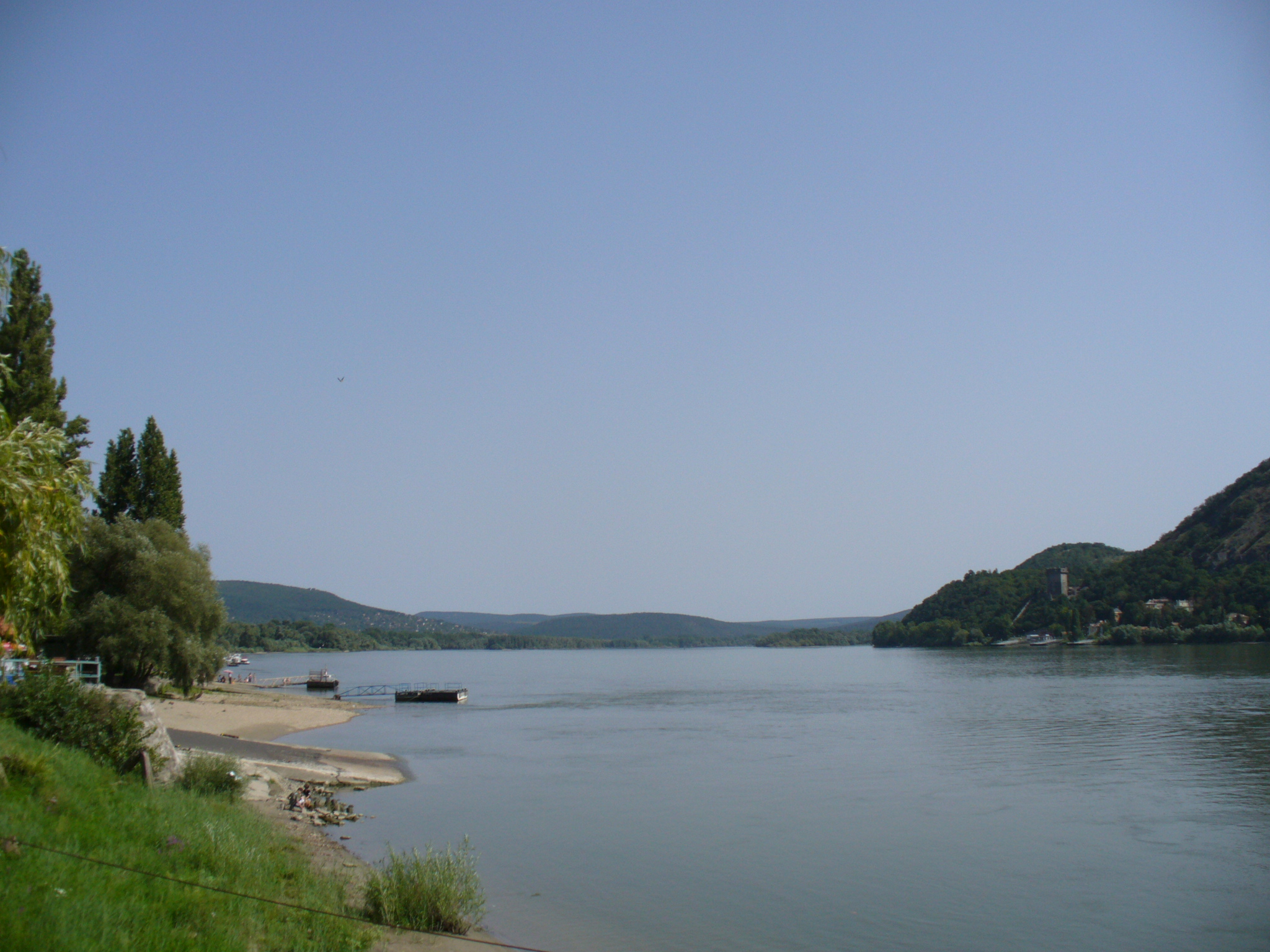
Danube river from Nagymaros

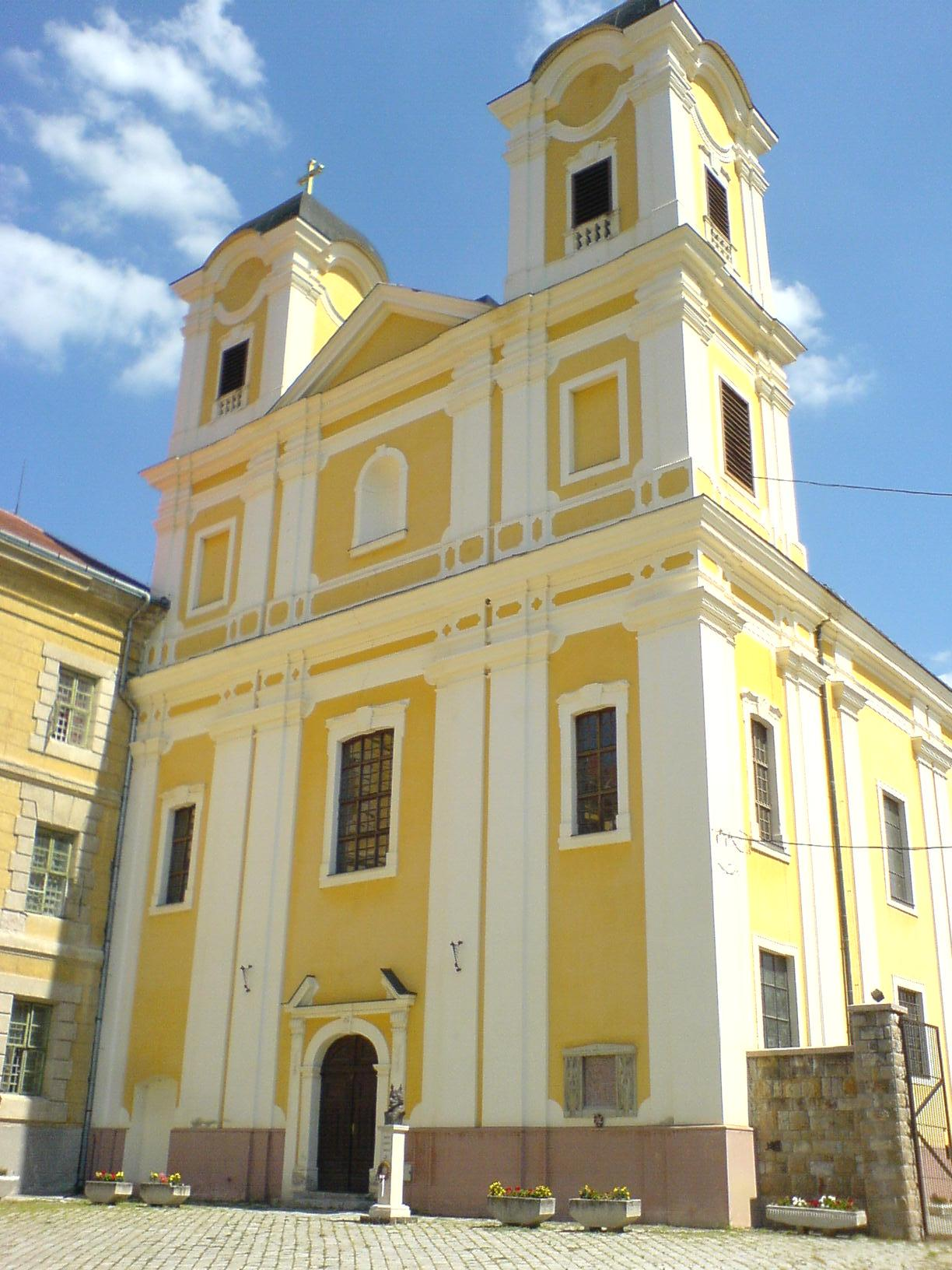
Our Lady of Hungary Church in Márianosztra

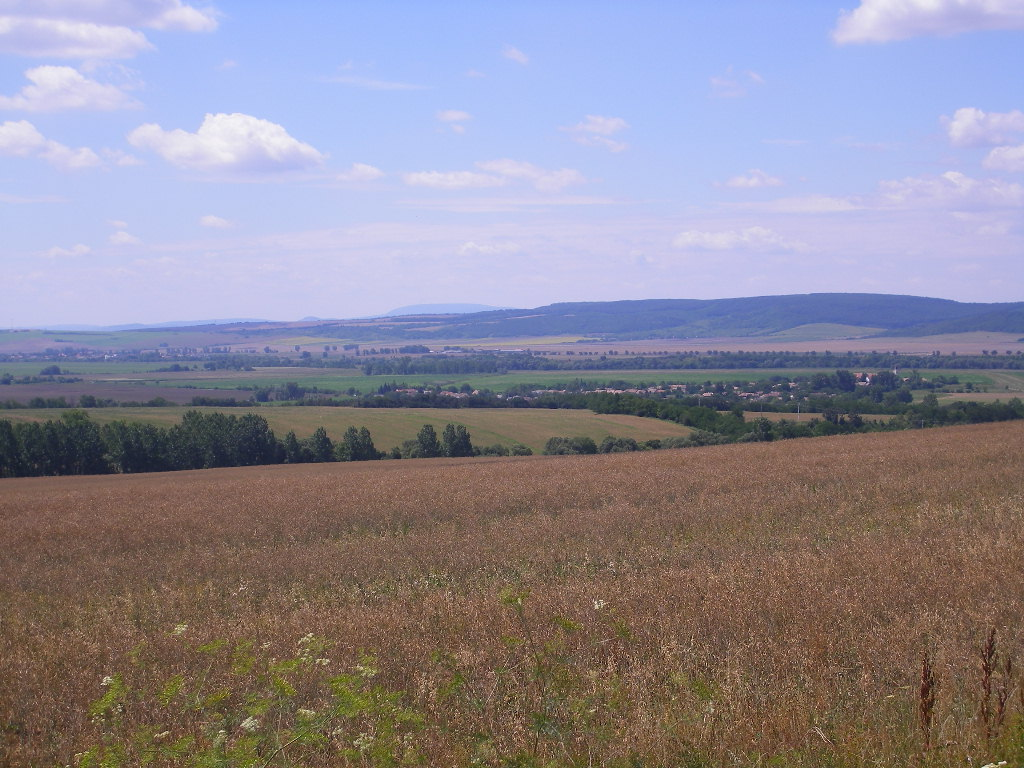
Panorama from Ipolytölgyes

== See also ==
- List of cities and towns in Hungary
