= Verőce =

Veröce or Verőce may refer to

- Verőce, the Hungarian name for Virovitica, Croatia
- Verőce vármegye, the Hungarian name for Virovitica County, Croatia-Slavonia
- Verőce, Hungary, a village in Pest County, Hungary
