= Kemence =

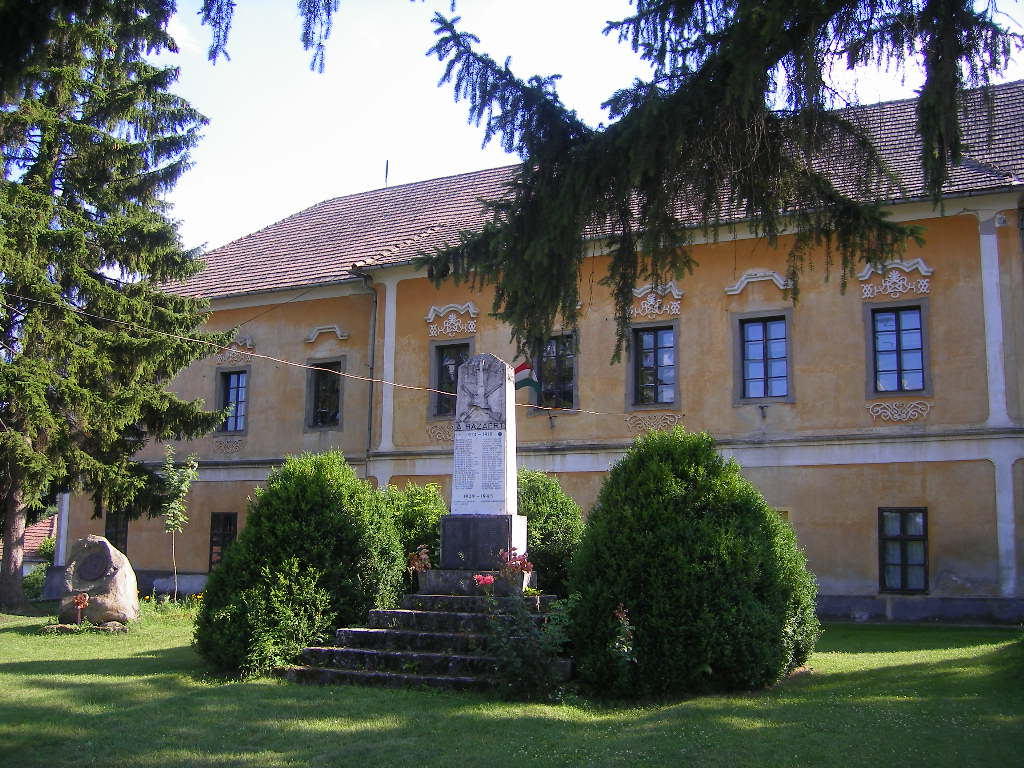
- Former county hall in Kemence

- Flag Coat of arms

- Location of Kemence in Hungary
- Coordinates: 48.02181°N 18.89503°E
- Country: Hungary
- Region: Central Hungary
- County: Pest
- Subregion: Szobi
- Rank: Village

Area
  - Total: 42.75 km^{2} (16.51 sq mi)

Population (1 January 2008)
  - Total: 1,036
  - Density: 24.23/km^{2} (62.77/sq mi)
- Time zone: UTC+1 (CET)
  - Summer (DST): UTC+2 (CEST)
- Postal code: 2638
- Area code: +36 27
- KSH code: 22345
- Website: http://www.kemence.hu

Kemence (Slovak: Kamenica) is a village in Szob District, Pest county, Hungary.
