= Mihály Nagymarosi =

Hungarian footballer

Mihály Nagymarosi (6 October 1919 in Nagymaros – 7 September 2002 in Nagymaros) was a Hungarian football midfielder, who played for Újpest FC, as well as representing 13 times the Hungary national football team between 1942 and 1950. He was a member of the Hungarian Golden Team.
