= Bernecebaráti =

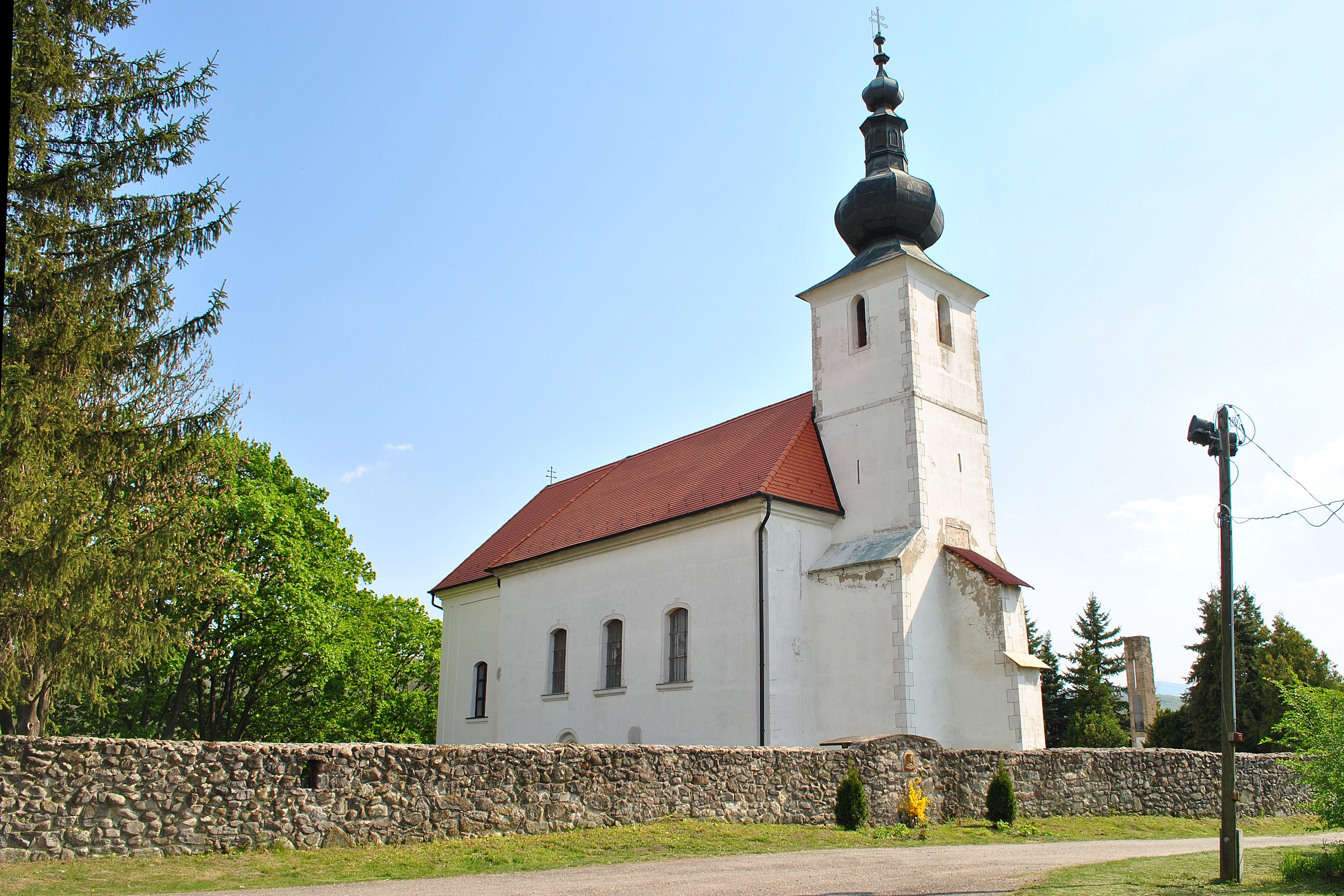
- Church of Our Lady

- Flag Coat of arms

- Location of Bernecebaráti in Hungary
- Coordinates: 48.04040°N 18.91202°E
- Country: Hungary
- Region: Central Hungary
- County: Pest
- District: Szob
- Rank: Village

Area
  - Total: 37.68 km^{2} (14.55 sq mi)

Population (1 January 2015)
  - Total: 898
  - Density: 23.8/km^{2} (61.7/sq mi)
- Time zone: UTC+1 (CET)
  - Summer (DST): UTC+2 (CEST)
- Postal code: 2639
- Area code: +36 27
- KSH code: 18777
- Website: www.bernecebarati.hu

Bernecebaráti (Slovak: Brnica-Barátovce) is a village in Pest county, Hungary.
