= Nagymaros =

- Town
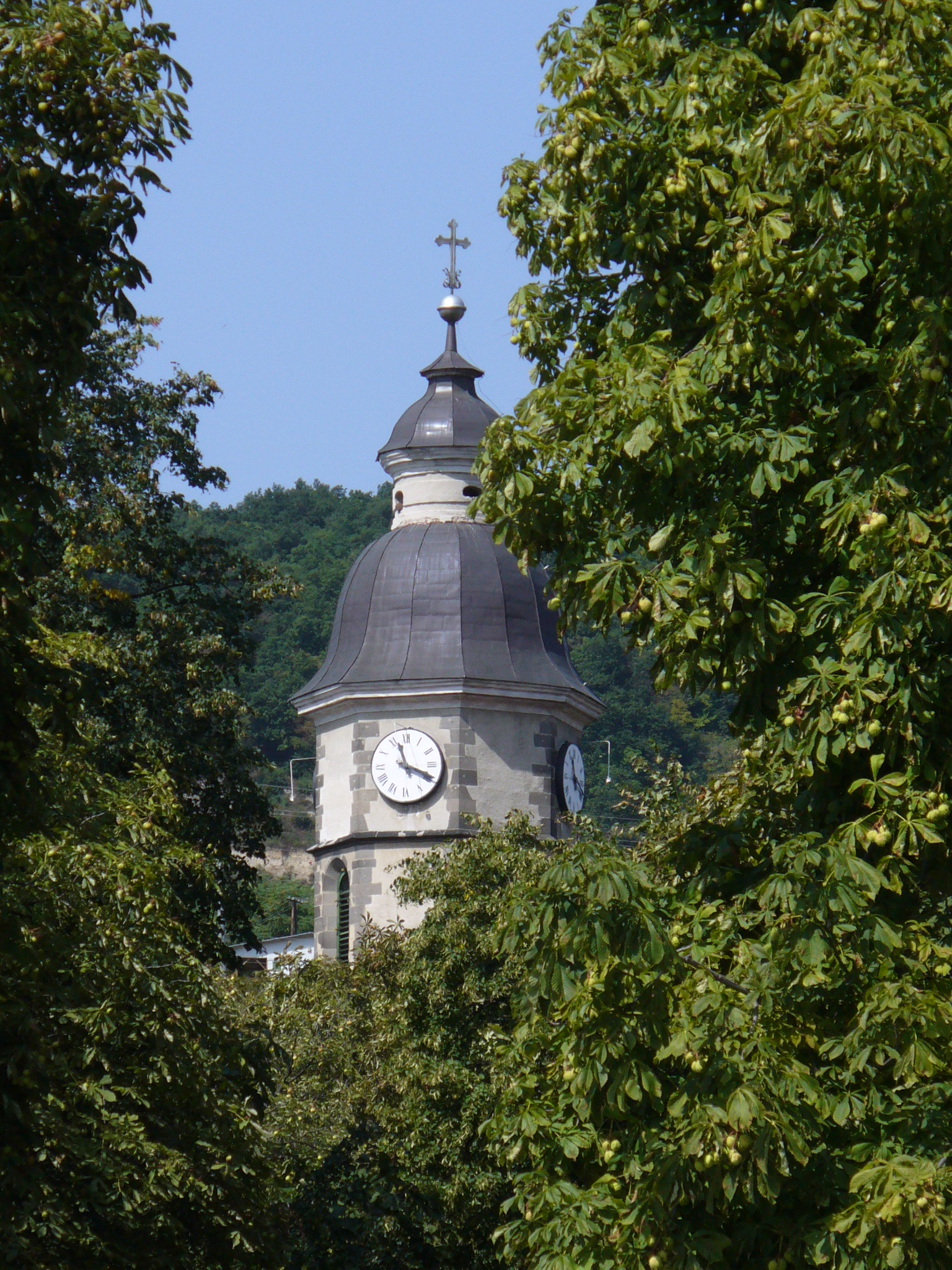
- The tower of the Roman Catholic church of Nagymaros

- Flag Coat of arms

- Location of Nagymaros
- Coordinates: 47.79064°N 18.95647°E
- Country: Hungary
- County: Pest
- District: Szob

Area
  - Total: 34.39 km^{2} (13.28 sq mi)

Population (2015)
  - Total: 4,721
  - Density: 137.3/km^{2} (355.5/sq mi)
- Time zone: UTC+1 (CET)
  - Summer (DST): UTC+2 (CEST)
- Postal code: 2626
- Area code: (+36) 27
- Website: www.nagymaros.hu

Nagymaros (German: Großmarosch, Slovak: Veľká Maruša) is a town in Pest county, Hungary.

== Etymology ==
The name comes from Maroš, the Slavic form of Marianus. Nagymaros—"Greater Maros" (Hungarian). The first written mention is Morus (1257).

== Notable people ==
- György Szabados (1939–2011), jazz musician
- Mihály Nagymarosi (1919–2002), footballer
- László Szalma (b. 1957), long jumper
- Tibor Gánti (1933–2009), biochemist

== Twin towns – sister cities ==
Nagymaros is twinned with:

- Gabčíkovo, Slovakia
- Grevesmühlen, Germany
- Velyki Heivtsi, Ukraine
