= Penc =

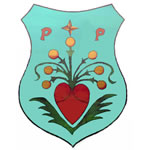
- Coat of arms

- Location of Penc in Hungary
- Coordinates: 47.80588°N 19.25050°E
- Country: Hungary
- Region: Central Hungary
- County: Pest
- Subregion: Váci
- Rank: Village

Government
  - Mayor: Králik József

Area
  - Total: 21.34 km^{2} (8.24 sq mi)

Population (1 January 2008)
  - Total: 1,460
  - Density: 68.4/km^{2} (177/sq mi)
- Time zone: UTC+1 (CET)
  - Summer (DST): UTC+2 (CEST)
- Postal code: 2614
- Area code: +36 27
- KSH code: 18689
- Website: www.penc.hu

Penc is a village in Pest county, Hungary.
