= Kismaros =

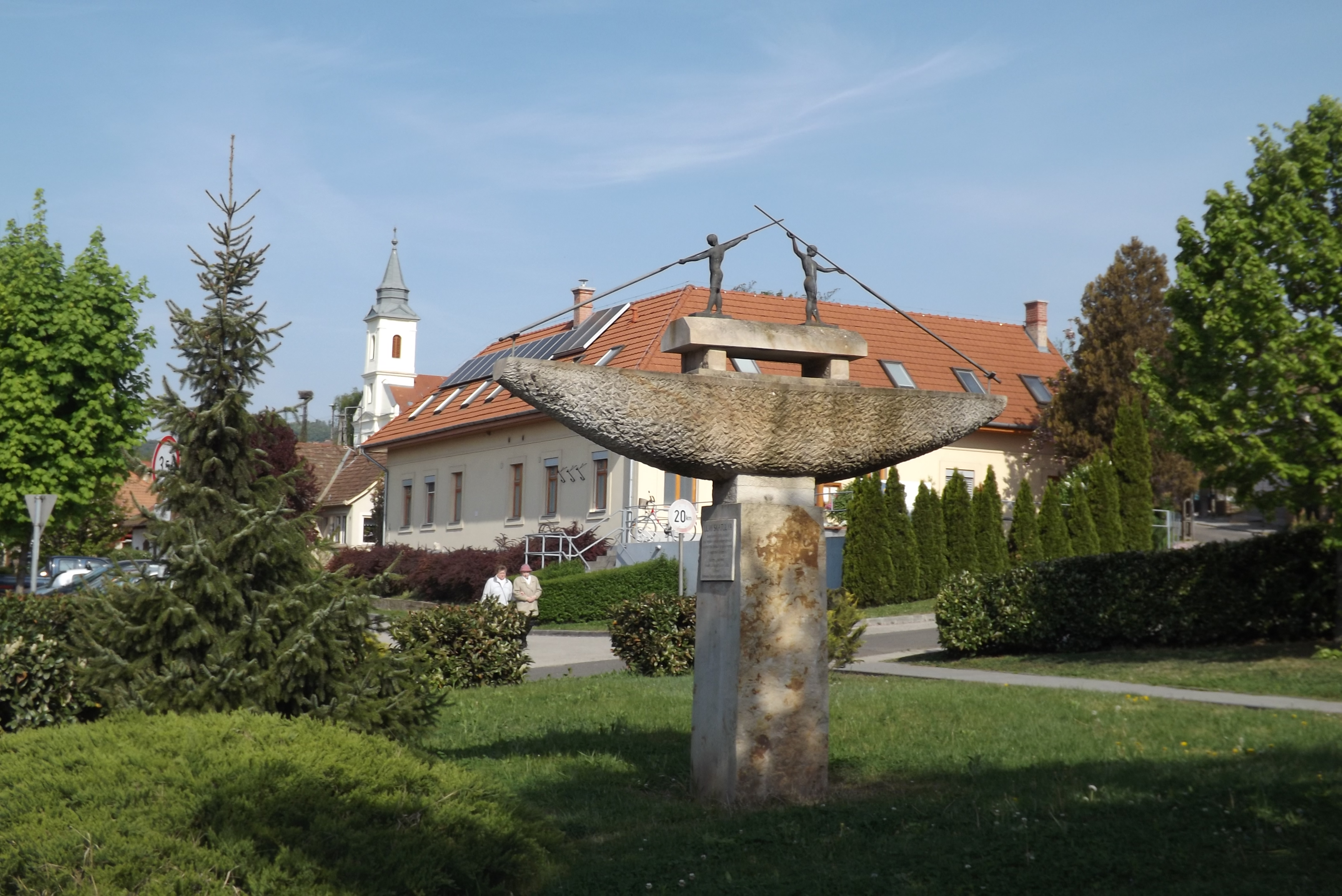
- Main Square -Köztársaság Square

- Flag Coat of arms

- Location of Kismaros in Hungary
- Coordinates: 47.83775°N 19.00471°E
- Country: Hungary
- Region: Central Hungary
- County: Pest
- Subregion: Szob
- Rank: Village

Area
  - Total: 11.96 km^{2} (4.62 sq mi)

Population (1 January 2023)
  - Total: 2,626
  - Density: 219.6/km^{2} (568.7/sq mi)
- Time zone: UTC+1 (CET)
  - Summer (DST): UTC+2 (CEST)
- Postal code: 2623
- Area code: +36 27
- KSH code: 33738
- Website: www.kismaros.hu

Kismaros (German: Kleinmarosch) is a village in Pest county, Hungary.

== Location ==
Kismaros is located 45 kilometres north of Budapest on the eastern bank of the Danube river, just above the bend where the river changes course and flows south. The village is seated at the foot of the Börzsöny Hills on the outskirts of the Carpathians.

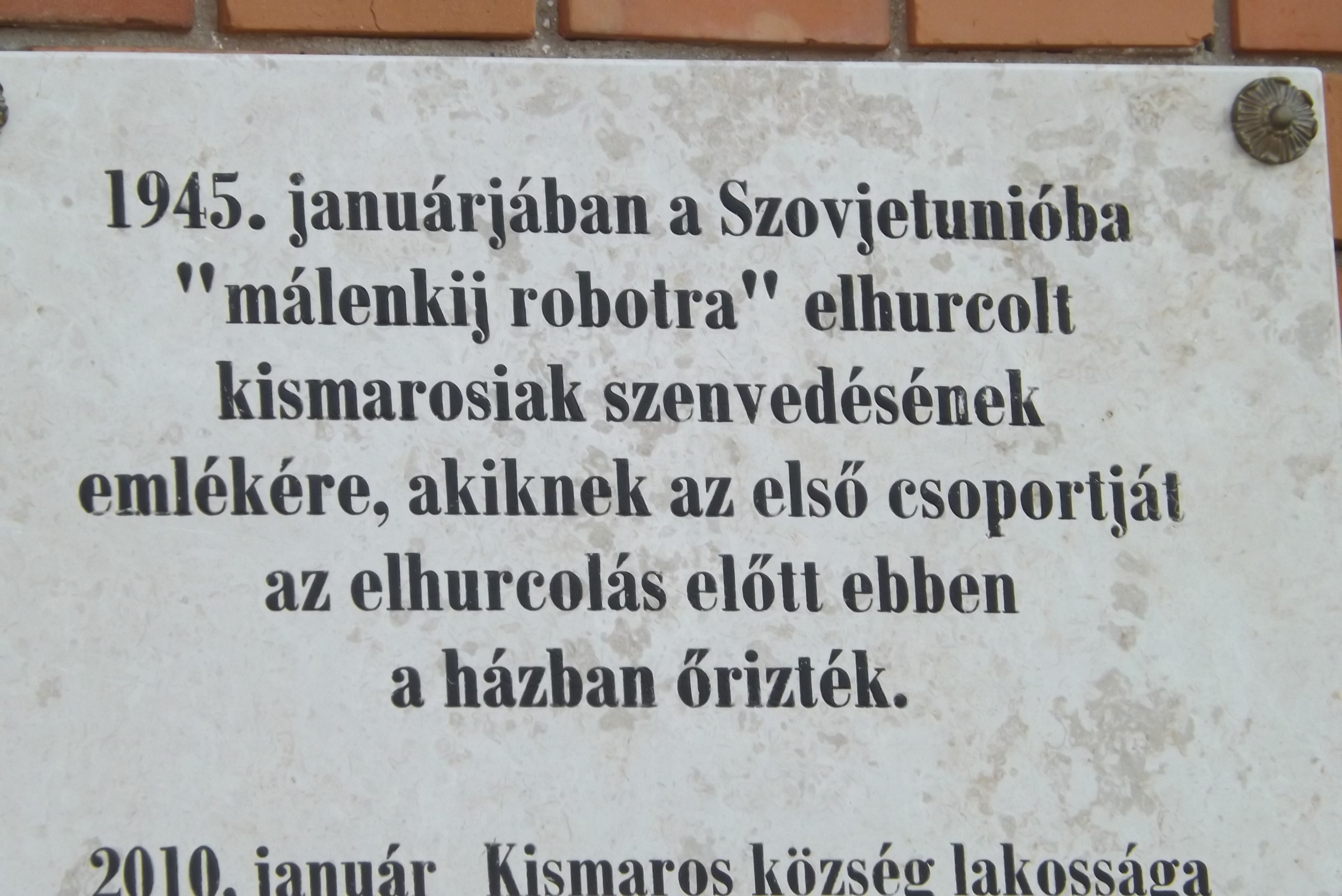
Plaque to commemorate the victims of forced labor - malenkiy robot

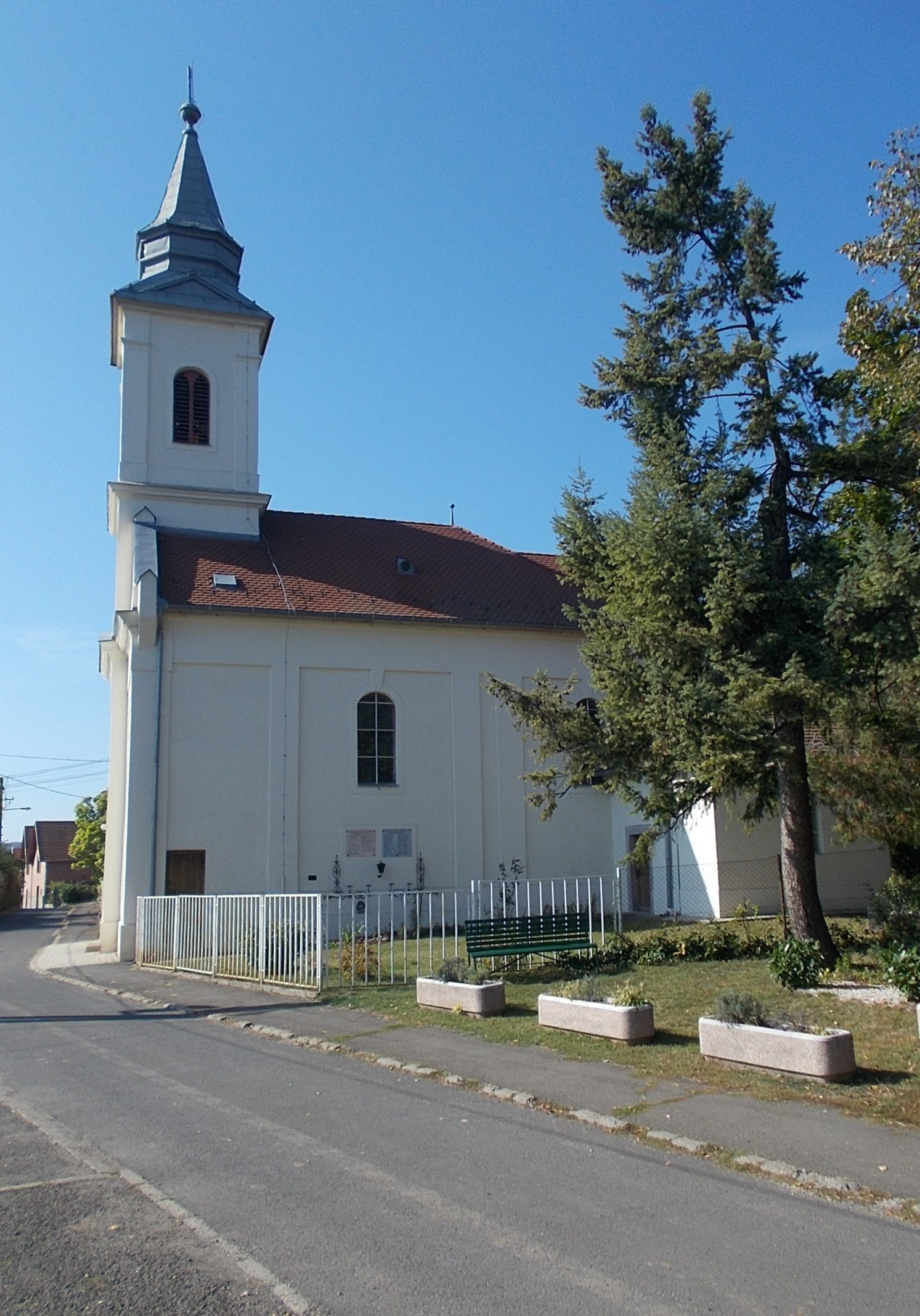
Catholic church

== History ==
=== First settlers ===
The village's history dates back to the 18th century when Germans from the Black Forest came to settle down in the area. The name of the village first appears on the “Vályi” map from 1781. The word Maros derives from the Latin "Mures" word and means waterfront, village or fortress. By the end of 18th century the population of Kismaros reached about 200-250 persons. With the effort of all villagers the catholic church was finished in 1827. Agriculture specifically the cultivation of grapes and other fruits provided livelihood for most residents. At the beginning of the 20th century the most spoken language is German.

=== "Malenkiy robot" ===
After the Second World War the Soviets took control in Hungary. Although prior to the war most people of Kismaros claimed Hungarian ethnicity already, their German origin meant that in January 1945 eighty of Kismaros’ youths (aged between 16-19) were taken by the Red Army to the Soviet Union, where they were subjected to forced labor in mines and factories. About half of them never returned. Survivors remember it, just as the Soviets put it, "Malenkiy robot" or little labour.

=== Modern life ===
From 1976 until 1990 Kismaros had a joint local government with neighbouring Verőce and was called Verőcemaros. Today's Kismaros is a busy suburban settlement of Budapest. Many of the locals work in the capital city, commuting every day by train or by car. After 1989 Kismaros became a hotspot for Budapesters trying to escape the hassles of city life; many of them settled down in the village permanently. Tourism plays an increasingly important role, providing jobs for local businesses.

== Demographics ==
According to the 2022 national census, Germans account for 6% of the population whereas over 90% claimed Hungarian ethnicity. About 50% of all residents are Roman Catholic. The population of the village has been growing constantly in the last decade reaching over 2600 people in recent years.

== Tourism ==
=== Börzsöny Hills' Children's Railway ===
Kismaros is the southern terminus for one of Hungary’s oldest light railways. The railway station is located in the centre of the village providing regular service throughout the year. The Börzsöny Hills' Children's Railway is a narrow gauge railway and is very popular among tourists. Every year thousands of people come to Kismaros to take a ride up to the Börzsöny Hills.

=== Marus Napok ===
Each year end of September the locals hold the festival “Marus Napok” to celebrate their rich German heritage. The festival's main attraction is when people march through the village with horse-drawn carriages, singing and dancing dressed in traditional clothes. Originally this was to celebrate a good vintage. The festivity is also a unique opportunity for visitors to taste the local cuisine and to listen to some authentic Swabian music.

=== Kismaros Village Museum ===
The museum houses a permanent historic exhibition to give visitors some insights into the villagers everyday life. This includes typical old agricultural tools, historic photos and religious relics. The exhibition covers the village life of those ethnic German settlers who arrived in the 18th century to people in present-day Kismaros.

== Transport links ==
From the capital Budapest, Kismaros can be reached by car or public transport.

=== By public transport ===
There are trains running from Budapest West railway station daytime in every 30 minutes. The journey time is approx. 45 minutes.

== Gallery ==
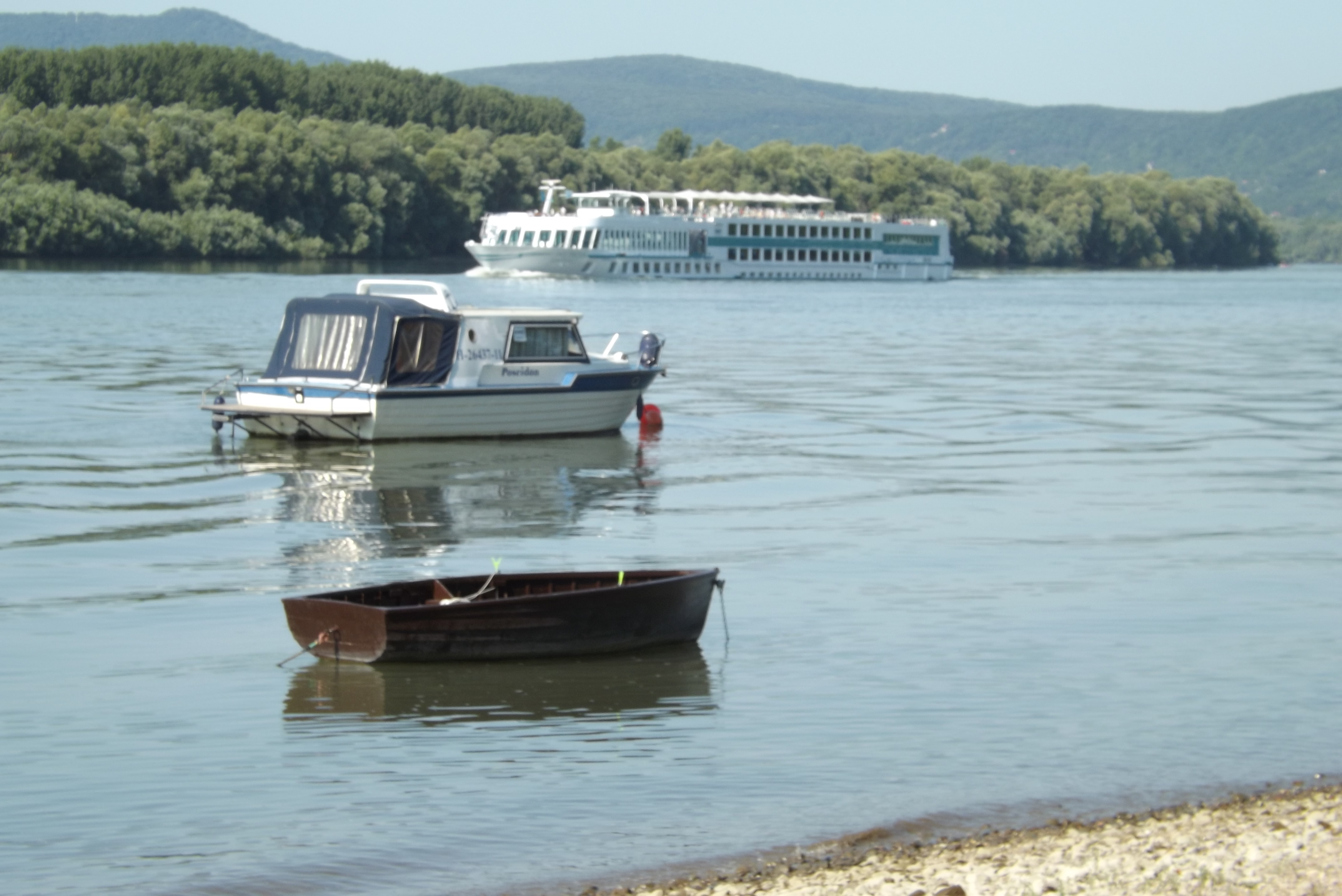
Danube by Kismaros

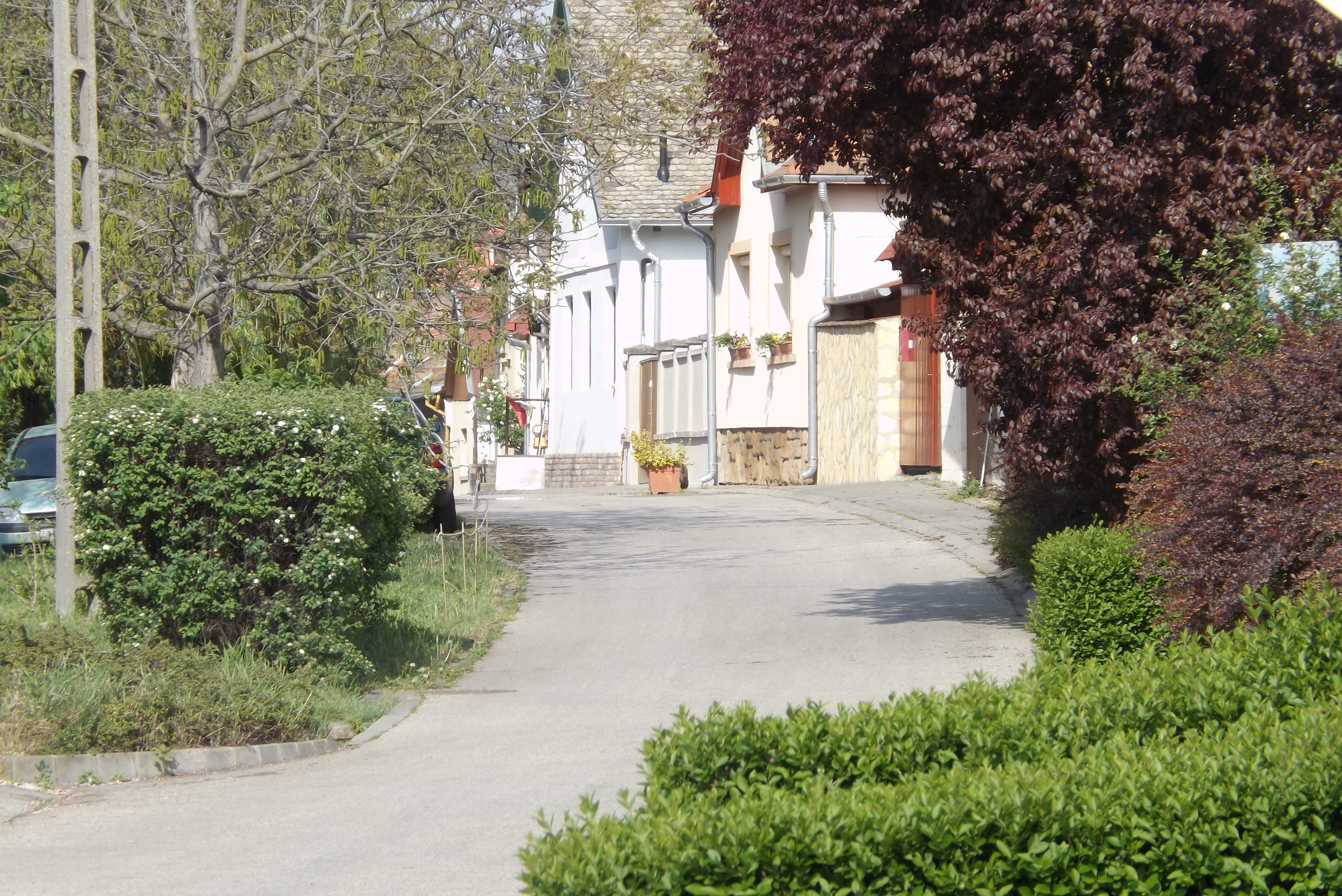
Street view

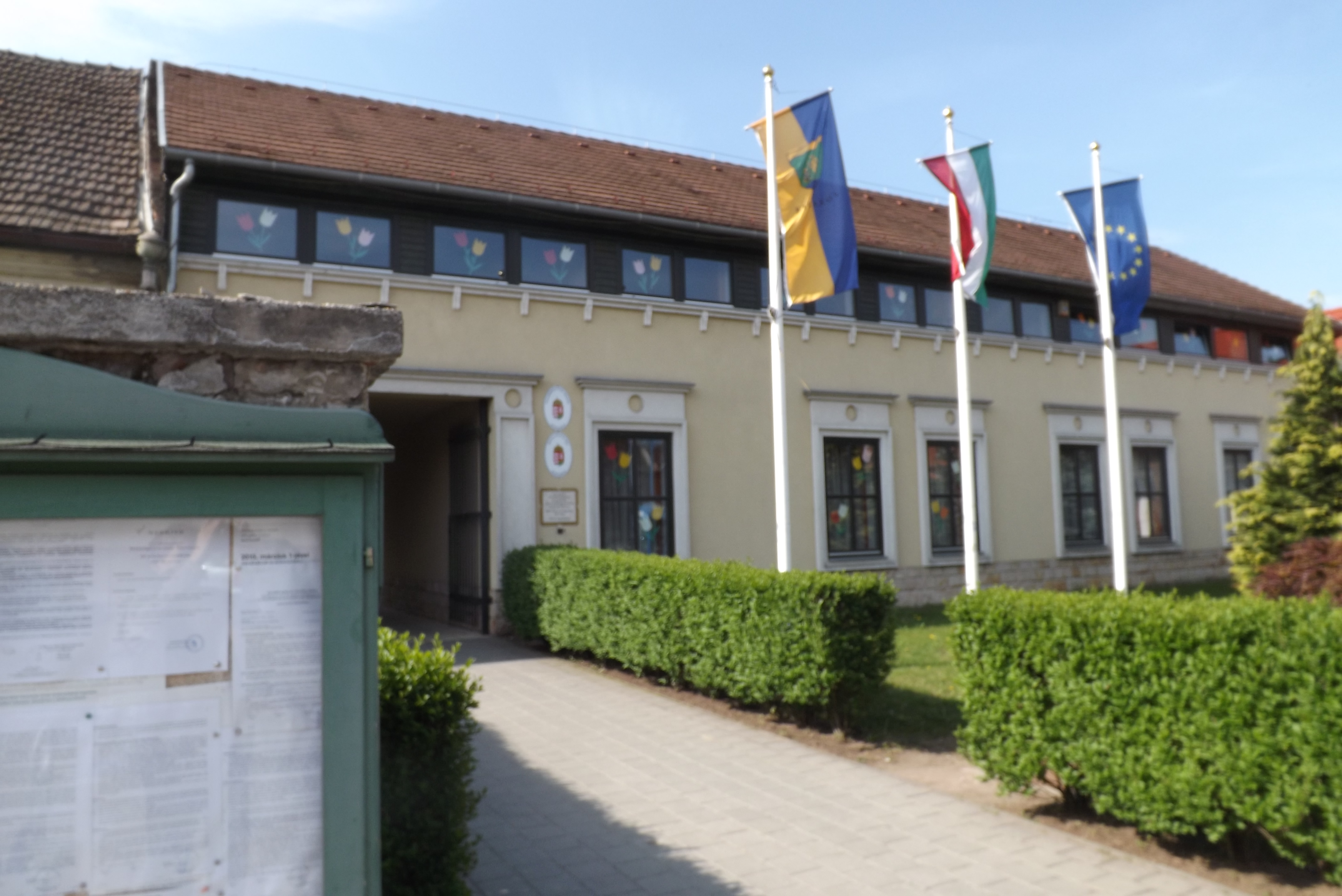
Council building

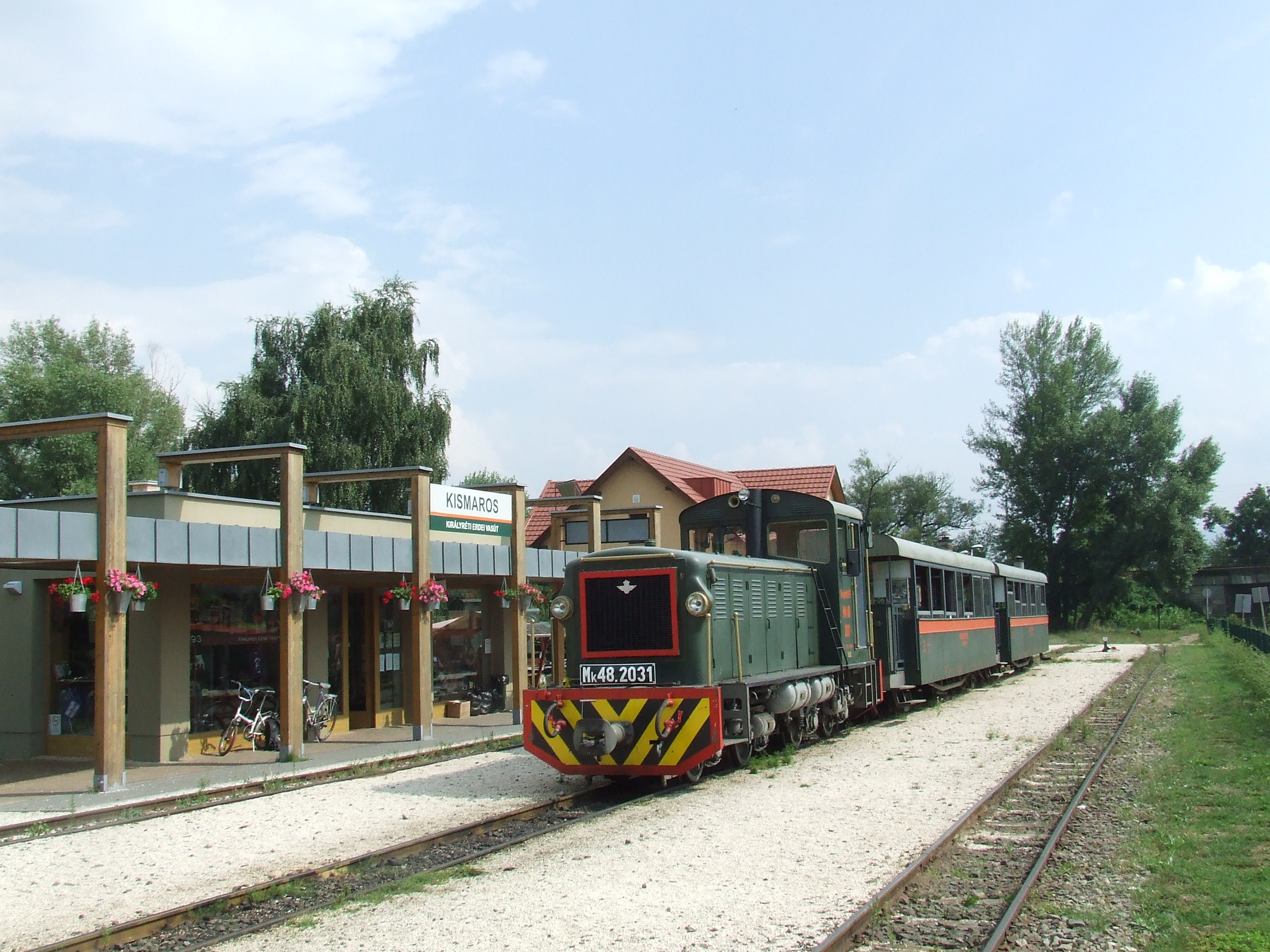
Diesel locomotive resting at the station in Kismaros

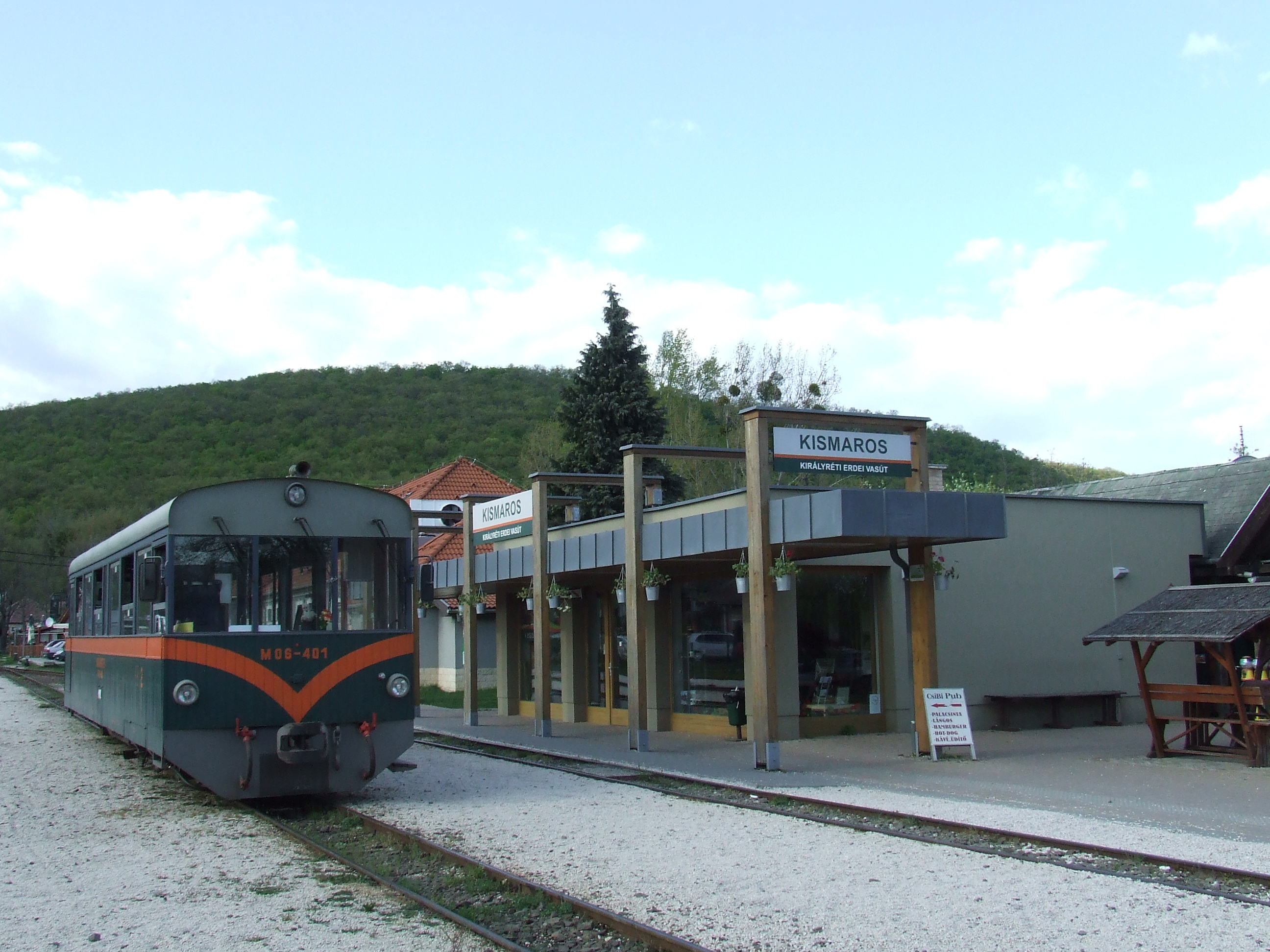
Another locomotive at the station

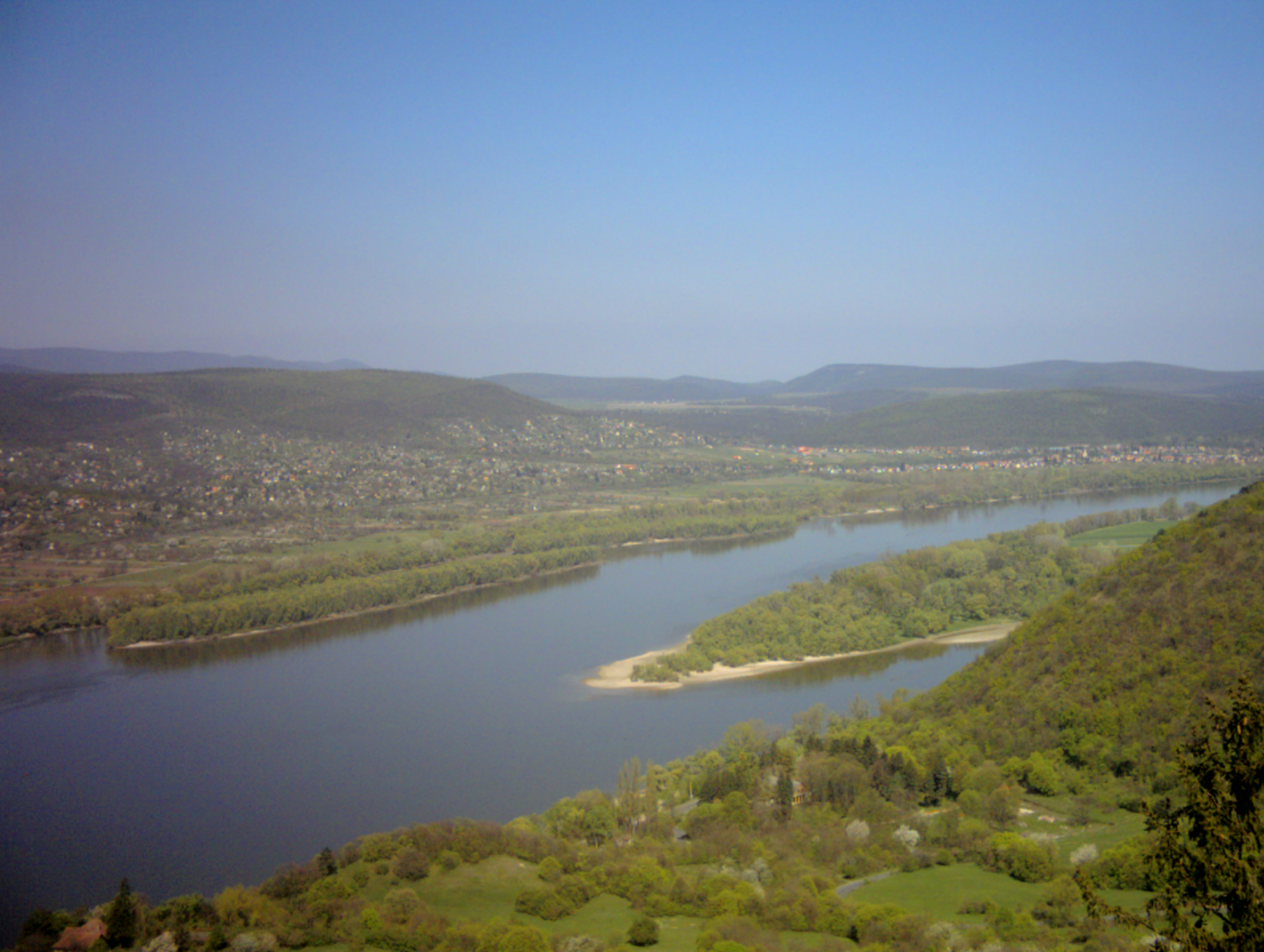
The view of Kismaros from Visegrad

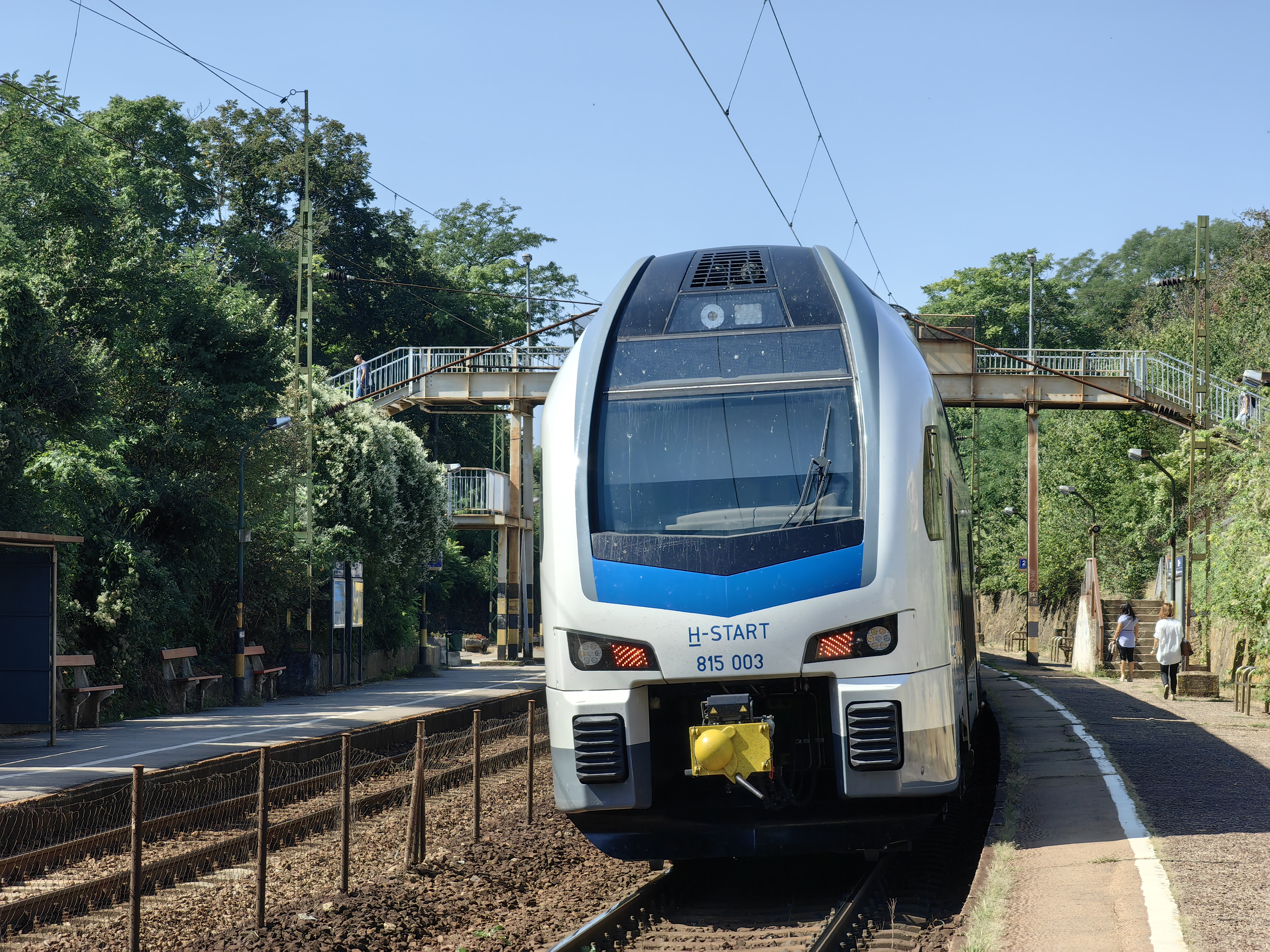
Mainline trainstation

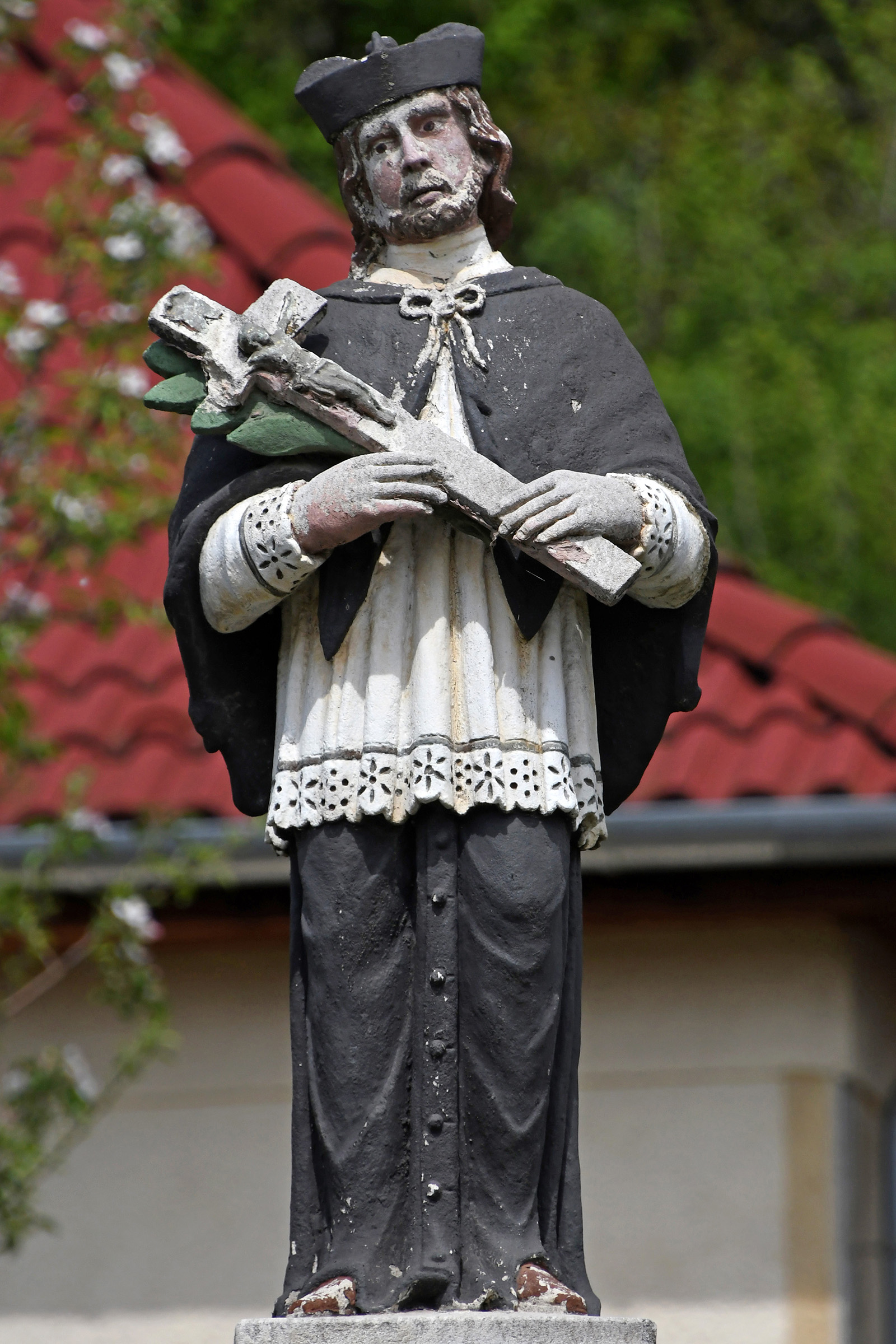
Statue of Saint John of Nepomuk

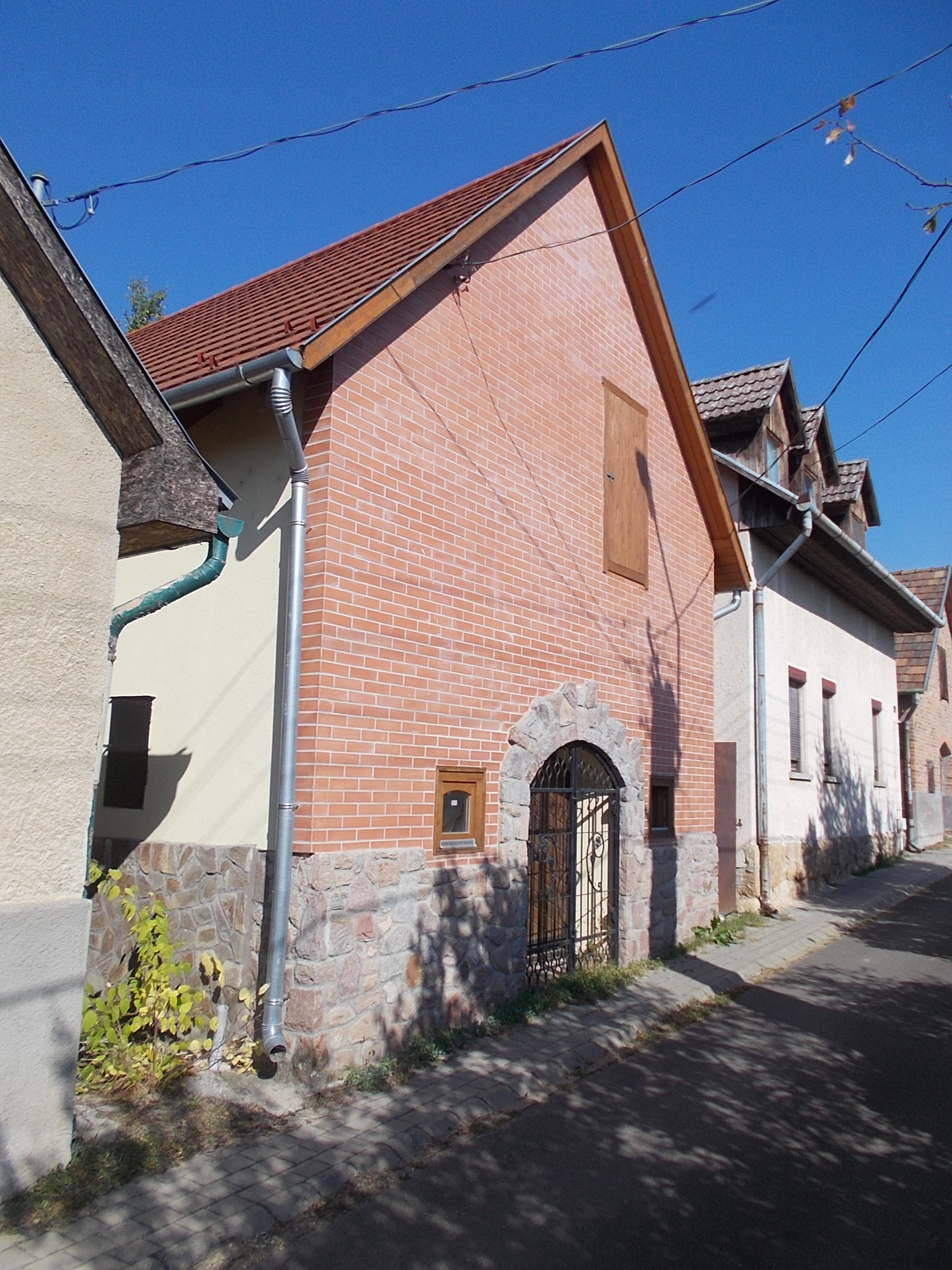
Traditional wine cellar

== Twin towns – sister cities ==
Kismaros is twinned with:

- Wallhausen, Germany
- Zetea, Romania

== Famous residents ==
- Tibor Pézsa — Hungarian fencer, olympic gold medalist in the sabre individual event (Tokyo - 1968).
- Erzsébet Viski — Hungarian sprint canoer, olympic silver medalist in the K-4 500 m event (Sydney - 2000, Athens - 2004).
