= Rád =

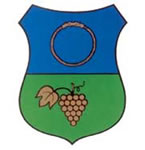
- Coat of arms

- Location of Rád in Hungary
- Coordinates: 47.79499°N 19.22054°E
- Country: Hungary
- Region: Central Hungary
- County: Pest
- Subregion: Váci
- Rank: Village

Government
  - Mayor: Lieszkovszki Gábor

Area
  - Total: 17.73 km^{2} (6.85 sq mi)

Population (1 January 2008)
  - Total: 1,840
  - Density: 104/km^{2} (269/sq mi)
- Time zone: UTC+1 (CET)
  - Summer (DST): UTC+2 (CEST)
- Postal code: 2613
- Area code: +36 27
- KSH code: 02370
- Website: www.rad.hu

Rád is a village in Pest county, Hungary.
