= Kóspallag =

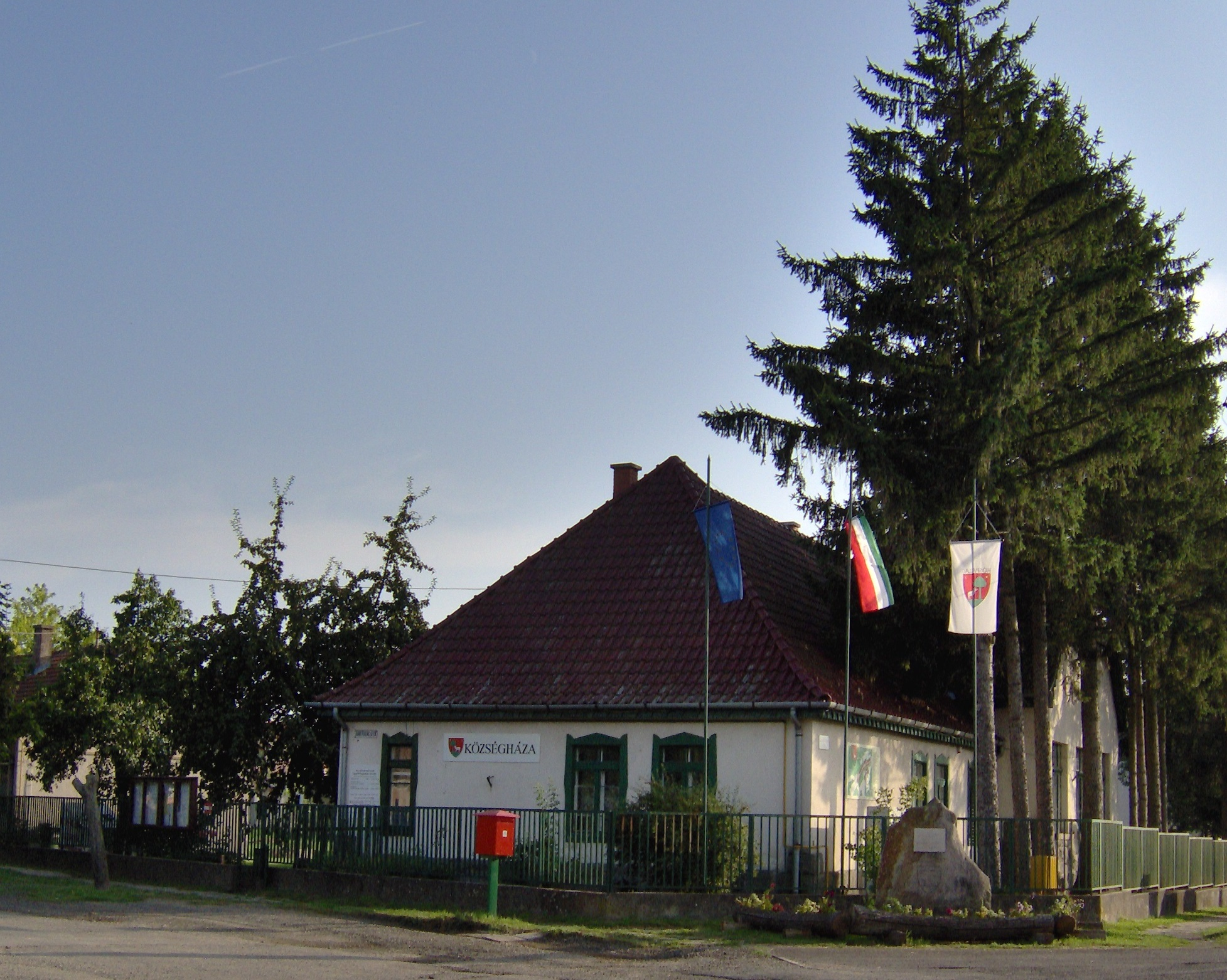
- Village hall

- Coat of arms

- Location of Kóspallag in Hungary
- Coordinates: 47.87364°N 18.93491°E
- Country: Hungary
- Region: Central Hungary
- County: Pest
- Subregion: Szobi
- Rank: Village

Area
  - Total: 12.77 km^{2} (4.93 sq mi)

Population (1 January 2008)
  - Total: 798
  - Density: 62.5/km^{2} (162/sq mi)
- Time zone: UTC+1 (CET)
  - Summer (DST): UTC+2 (CEST)
- Postal code: 2625
- Area code: +36 27
- KSH code: 24679
- Website: www.kospallag.hu

Kóspallag is a village in Pest county, Hungary.
