= Ipolytölgyes =

- Coat of arms

- Location of Ipolytölgyes in Hungary
- Coordinates: 47.92322°N 18.77709°E
- Country: Hungary
- Region: Central Hungary
- County: Pest
- Subregion: Szobi
- Rank: Village

Area
  - Total: 13.66 km^{2} (5.27 sq mi)

Population (1 January 2008)
  - Total: 458
  - Density: 33.5/km^{2} (86.8/sq mi)
- Time zone: UTC+1 (CET)
  - Summer (DST): UTC+2 (CEST)
- Postal code: 2633
- Area code: +36 27
- KSH code: 04978
- Website: www.ipolytolgyes.hu

Ipolytölgyes is a village in Pest county, Hungary.
