= Verőce, Hungary =

Verőce
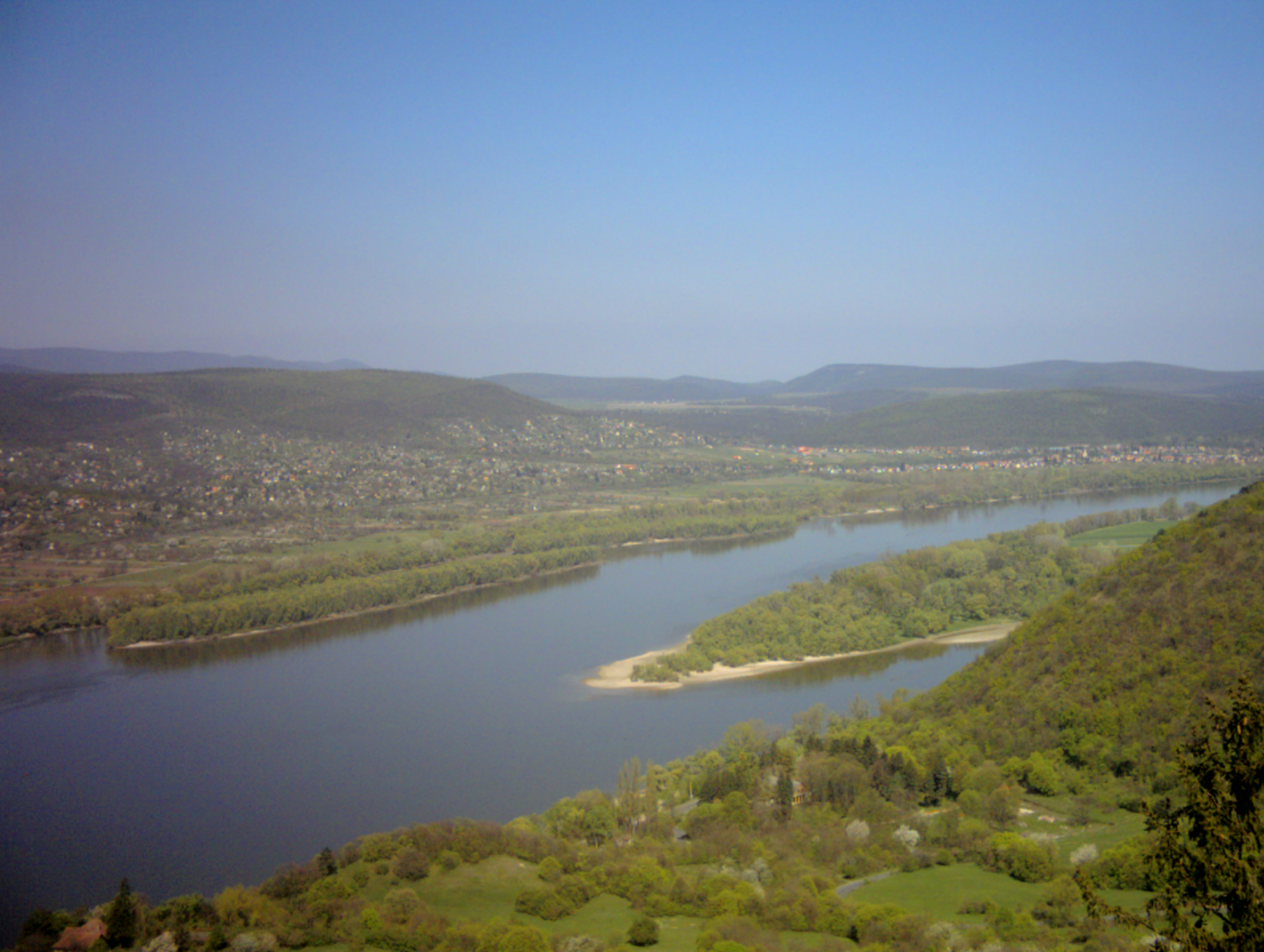
- Verőce in the distance from Visegrad

- Flag Coat of arms

- Location of Verőce in Hungary.
- Coordinates: 47°50′N 19°02′E
- Country: Hungary
- Region: Central Hungary
- County: Pest

Government
  - Mayor: Grauszmann György (Ind.)

Area
  - Total: 20.33 km^{2} (7.85 sq mi)

Population (2022)
  - Total: 4,094
  - Density: 201.4/km^{2} (521.6/sq mi)
- Time zone: UTC+1 (CET)
  - Summer (DST): UTC+2 (CEST)
- Postal code: 2621
- Area code: 27
- Website: www.veroce.hu

Verőce is a village and commune in Pest County in Hungary. From 1976 to 1990 the village of Verőce was merged with the village of Kismaros, to create a new merged settlement called Verőcemaros. This settlement was disestablished in 1990, when the two villages were again separated and Verőce again became a separate settlement.

== Sights ==
- The riverside system of retaining walls, first started based on the plans of famous Hungarian architect Miklós Ybl.
