= Pest County 14th constituency =

Hungarian legislative district

- Constituency for the National Assembly
- Location of Pest county 14 within Pest county

- Location of Pest county within Hungary
- County: Pest County
- Electorate: 72,772 (2026)
- Major settlements: Cegléd

Current constituency
- Created: 2024

The Pest County 14th parliamentary constituency is one of the 106 constituencies into which the territory of Hungary is divided by Act LXXIX of 2024, and in which voters can elect one member of the National Assembly. The standard abbreviation of the constituency name is: Pest 14. OEVK. The seat is Cegléd.

== Area ==
The constituency includes the following settlements:

1. Abony
2. Cegléd
3. Csemő
4. Jászkarajenő
5. Kocsér
6. Kőröstetétlen
7. Nagykőrös
8. Nyársapát
9. Törtel
10. Újszilvás

== Parliamentary elections ==
=== Tisza Party primary election ===
2025 Opposition primary
Candidate	First round		Second round	
Candidate	Result	%	Result	%
Gergely Muhari	Passed	40	Candidate for Representative	84.2
Mrs. Trepák Kiss Vivien	Passed	31	Eliminated	15.8
Vanda Jardány	Eliminated	29	–	
Gergely Muhari wins the primary election.

== See also ==
- List of constituencies of Hungary
