= Cegléd District =

Coordinates: 47.1833°N 19.8000°E

Cegléd District Ceglédi járás
- Districts of Hungary
- Coat of arms

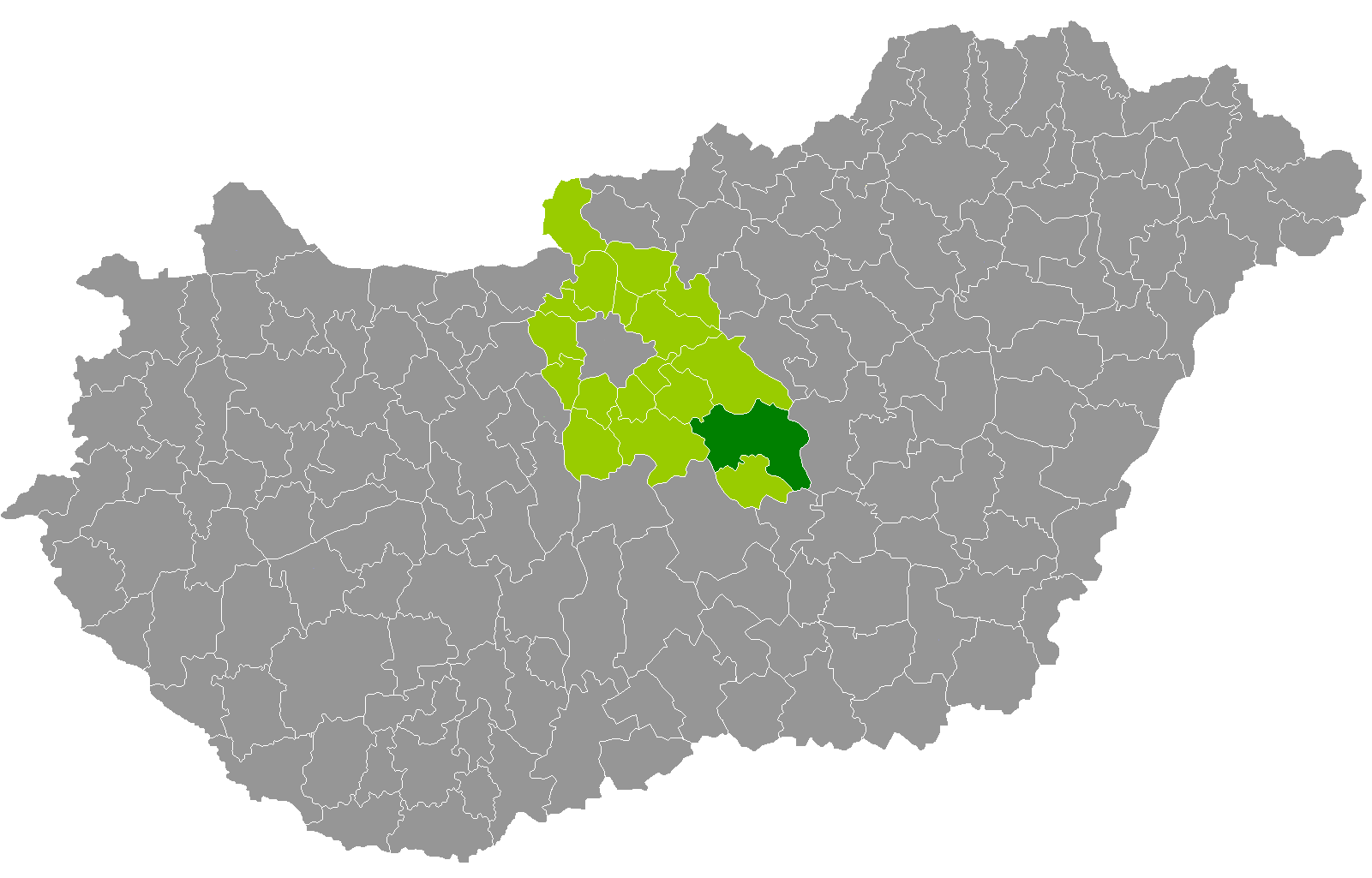
- Cegléd District within Hungary and Pest County.
- Country: Hungary
- County: Pest
- District seat: Cegléd

Area
  - Total: 886.30 km^{2} (342.20 sq mi)
  - Rank: 1st in Pest

Population (2011 census)
  - Total: 88,952
  - Rank: 4th in Pest
  - Density: 100/km^{2} (260/sq mi)

Cegléd (Hungarian: Ceglédi járás) is a district in south-eastern part of Pest County. Cegléd is also the name of the town where the district seat is found. The district is located in the Central Hungary Statistical Region.

== Geography ==
Cegléd District borders with Nagykáta District to the north, Szolnok District (Jász-Nagykun-Szolnok County) to the east, Tiszakécske District (Bács-Kiskun County) and Nagykőrös District to the south, Kecskemét District (Bács-Kiskun County) to the southwest, Dabas District to the west, Monor District to the northwest. The number of the inhabited places in Cegléd District is 12.

== Municipalities ==
The district has 3 towns and 9 villages. (ordered by population, as of 1 January 2013)

- **Abony** (14,769)
- **Albertirsa** (12,181)
- **Cegléd** (36,384) – district seat
- Ceglédbercel (4,364)
- Csemő (4,166)
- Dánszentmiklós (3,103)
- Jászkarajenő (2,724)
- Kőröstetétlen (904)
- Mikebuda (681)
- Tápiószőlős (2,928)
- Törtel (4,383)
- Újszilvás (2,674)

The bolded municipalities are cities.

== Demographics ==
Religion in Cegléd District (2011 census)
1. Catholic Church (35.9%)
2. Greek Catholicism (0.30%)
3. Calvinism (12.0%)
4. Lutheranism (4.50%)
5. Other religions (1.40%)
6. Non-religious (16.1%)
7. Atheists (0.80%)
8. Undeclared (29.0%)

In 2011, it had a population of 88,952 and the population density was 100/km².

Year	County population	Change
2011	88,952	n/a

=== Ethnicity ===
Besides the Hungarian majority, the main minorities are the Roma (approx. 1,800), German (950) and Romanian (300).

Total population (2011 census): 88,952
Ethnic groups (2011 census): Identified themselves: 79,369 persons:

- Hungarians: 75,431 (95.04%)
- Gypsies: 1,837 (2.31%)
- Germans: 966 (1.22%)
- Others and indefinable: 1,135 (1.43%)

Approx. 9,500 persons in Cegléd District did not declare their ethnic group at the 2011 census.

=== Religion ===
Religious adherence in the county according to 2011 census:

- Catholic – 32,171 (Roman Catholic – 31,892; Greek Catholic – 268);
- Reformed – 10,632;
- Evangelical – 3,987;
- other religions – 1,257;
- Non-religious – 14,304;
- Atheism – 781;
- Undeclared – 25,820.

== Gallery ==
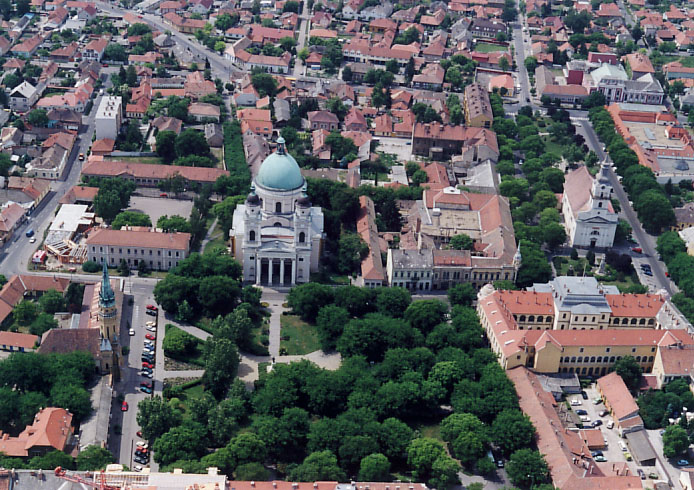
Cegléd, the district seat

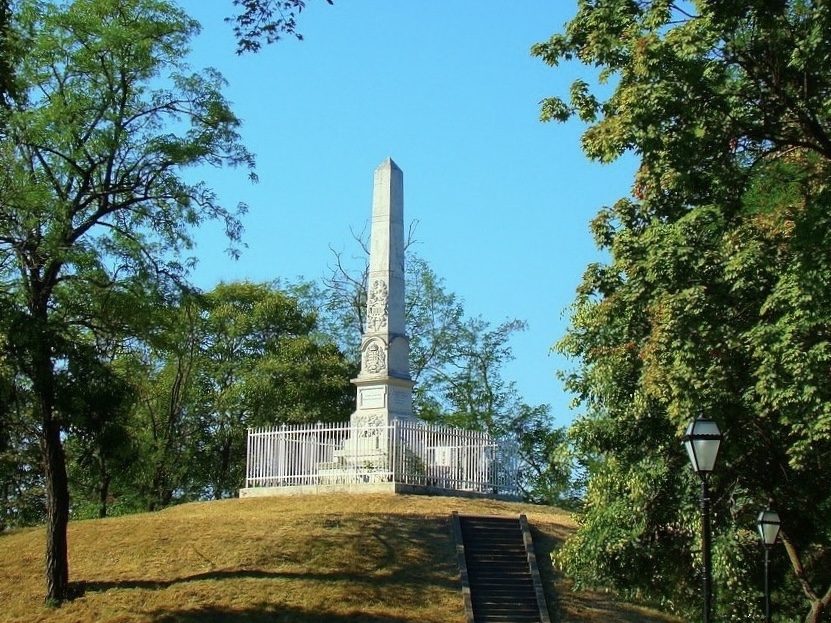
Millennium Monument in Kőröstetétlen

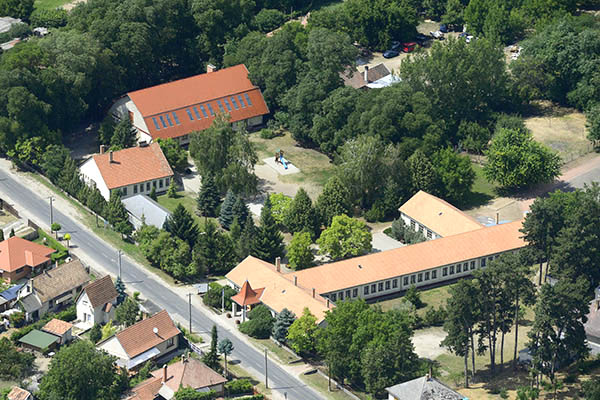
Aerial view of Dánszentmiklós

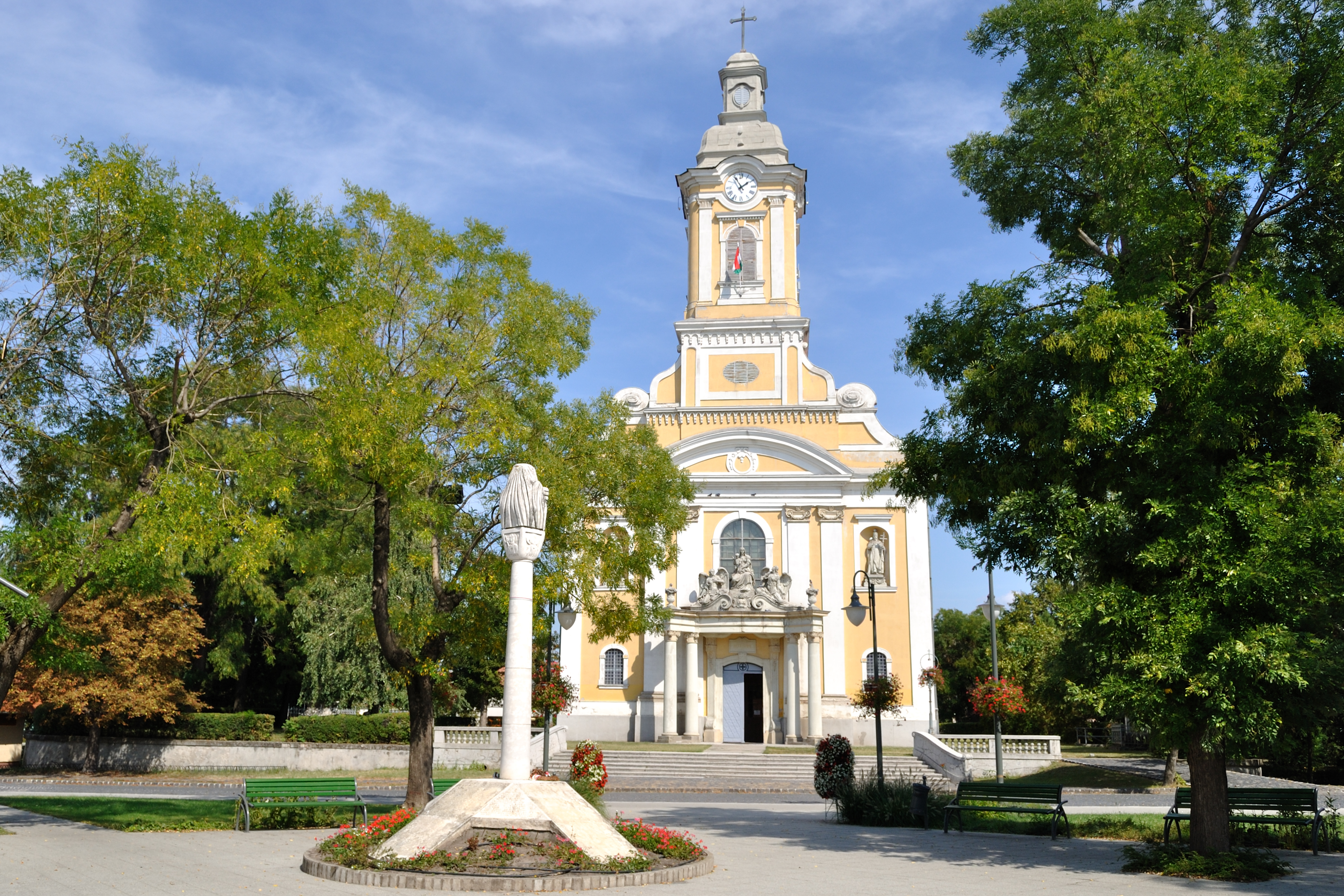
Roman Catholic Church in Abony

== See also ==
- List of cities and towns in Hungary
