= Nagykőrös District =

Nagykőrös District Nagykőrösi járás
- Districts of Hungary
- Coat of arms

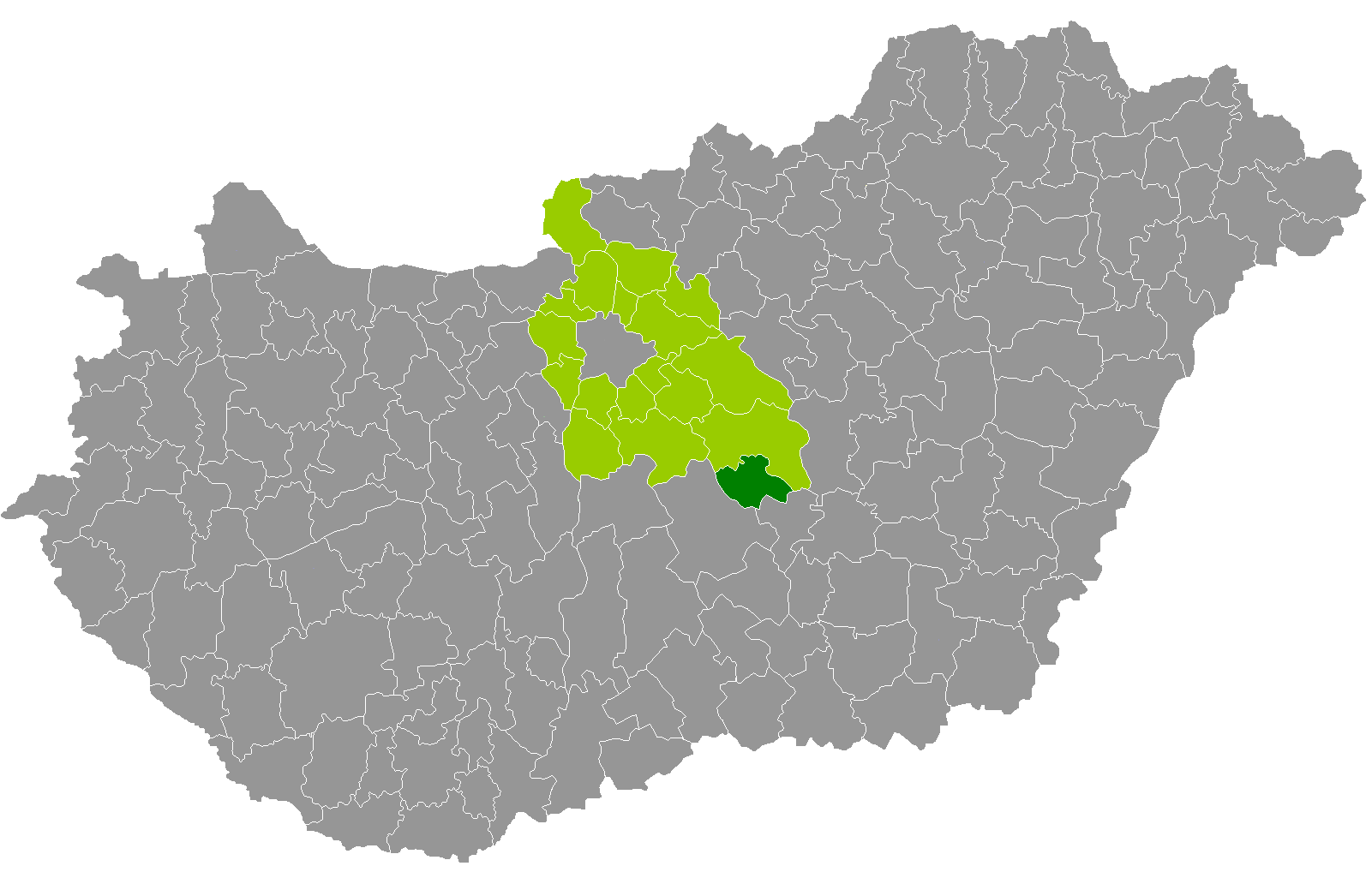
- Nagykőrös District within Hungary and Pest County.
- Coordinates: 47.03°N 19.78°E
- Country: Hungary
- County: Pest
- District seat: Nagykőrös

Area
  - Total: 349.25 km^{2} (134.85 sq mi)
  - Rank: 8th in Pest

Population (2011 census)
  - Total: 27,977
  - Rank: 17th in Pest
  - Density: 80/km^{2} (210/sq mi)

Nagykőrös (Hungarian: Nagykőrösi járás) is a district in the south-eastern part of Pest County, Hungary. Nagykőrös is also the name of the town where the district seat is found. The district is located in the Central Hungary Statistical Region.

== Geography ==
Nagykőrös District borders with Cegléd District to the north, Tiszakécske District (Bács-Kiskun County) to the southeast, Kecskemét District (Bács-Kiskun County) to the southwest. The number of the inhabited places in Nagykőrös District is 3.

== Municipalities ==
The district has 1 town and 2 villages. (ordered by population, as of 1 January 2013)

- Kocsér (1,859)
- **Nagykőrös** (24,016) – district seat
- Nyársapát (1,949)

The bolded municipality is the city.

== Demographics ==
Religion in Nagykőrös District (2011 census)
1. Catholic Church (26.4%)
2. Greek Catholicism (0.10%)
3. Calvinism (22.8%)
4. Lutheranism (0.30%)
5. Other religions (1.70%)
6. Non-religious (19.3%)
7. Atheists (0.80%)
8. Undeclared (28.6%)

In 2011, it had a population of 27,977 and the population density was 80/km^{2}.

Year	County population	Change
2011	27,977	n/a

=== Ethnicity ===
Besides the Hungarian majority, the main minorities are the Roma (approx. 500), German (150) and Romanian (100).

Total population (2011 census): 27,977
Ethnic groups (2011 census): Identified themselves: 25,043 persons:

- Hungarians: 24,008 (95.87%)
- Gypsies: 467 (1.86%)
- Others and indefinable: 568 (2.27%)

Approx. 3,000 persons in Nagykőrös District did not declare their ethnic group at the 2011 census.

=== Religion ===
Religious adherence in the county according to 2011 census:

- Catholic – 7,406 (Roman Catholic – 7,368; Greek Catholic – 37);
- Reformed – 6,388;
- Evangelical – 93;
- other religions – 459;
- Non-religious – 5,393;
- Atheism – 236;
- Undeclared – 8,002.

== Gallery ==
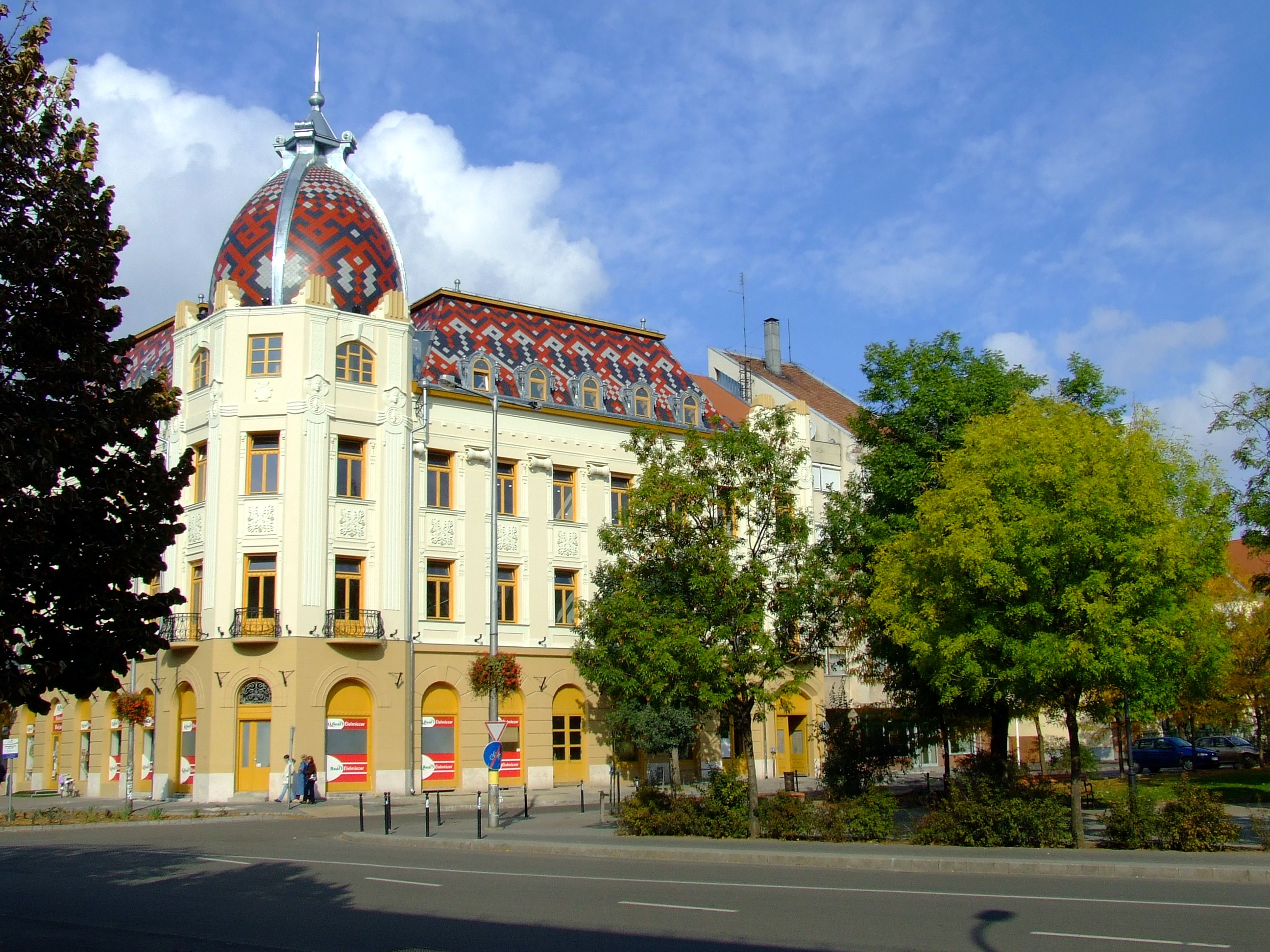
Downtown of Nagykőrös

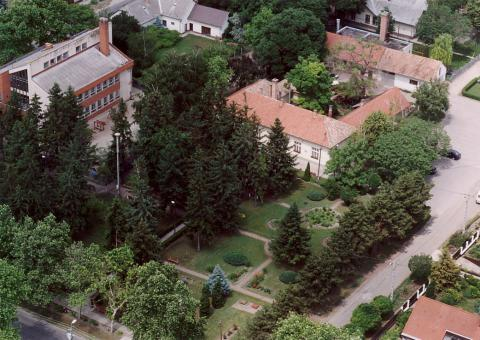
Aerial view of Kocsér

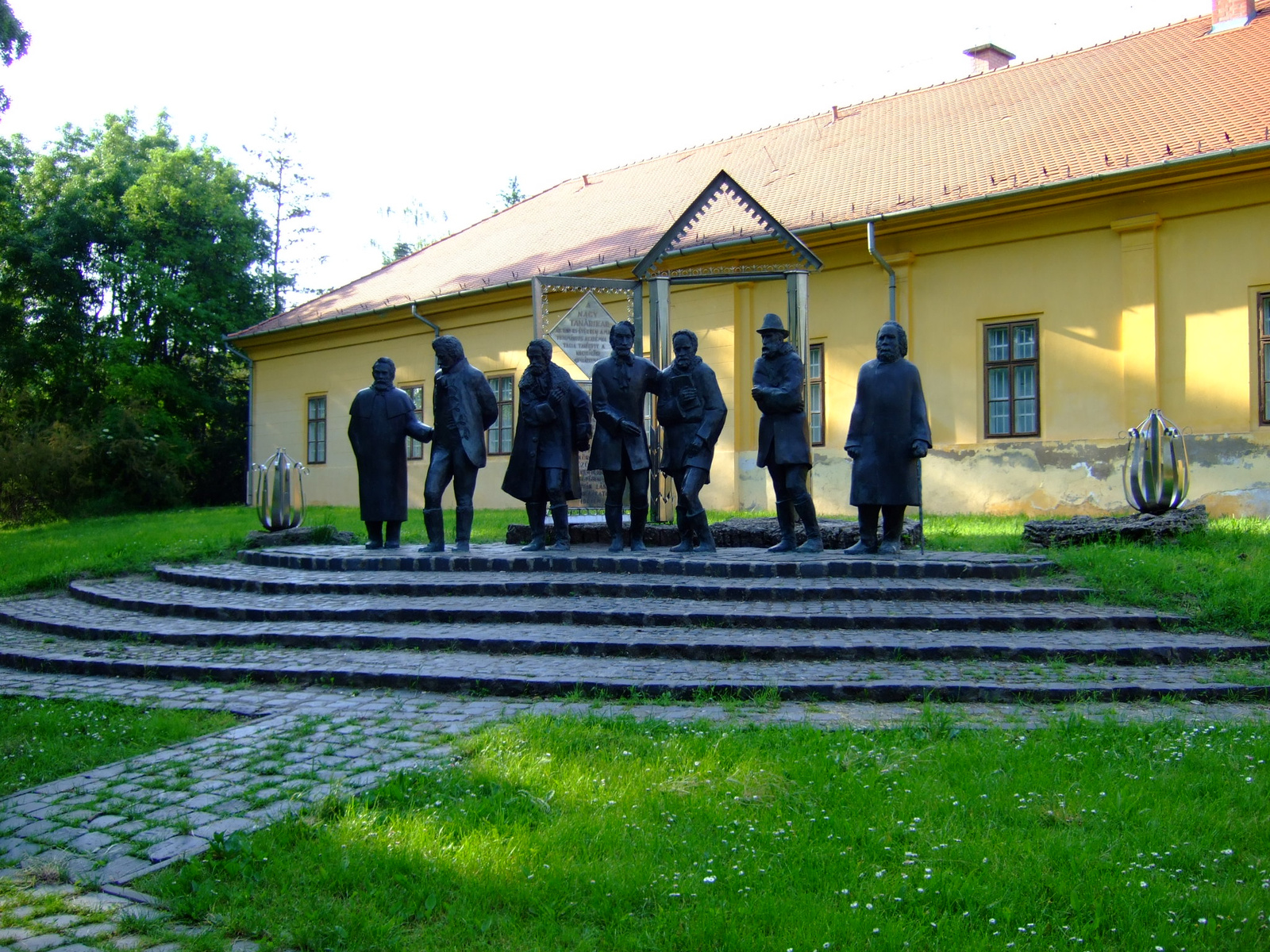
János Arany Museum in Nagykőrös

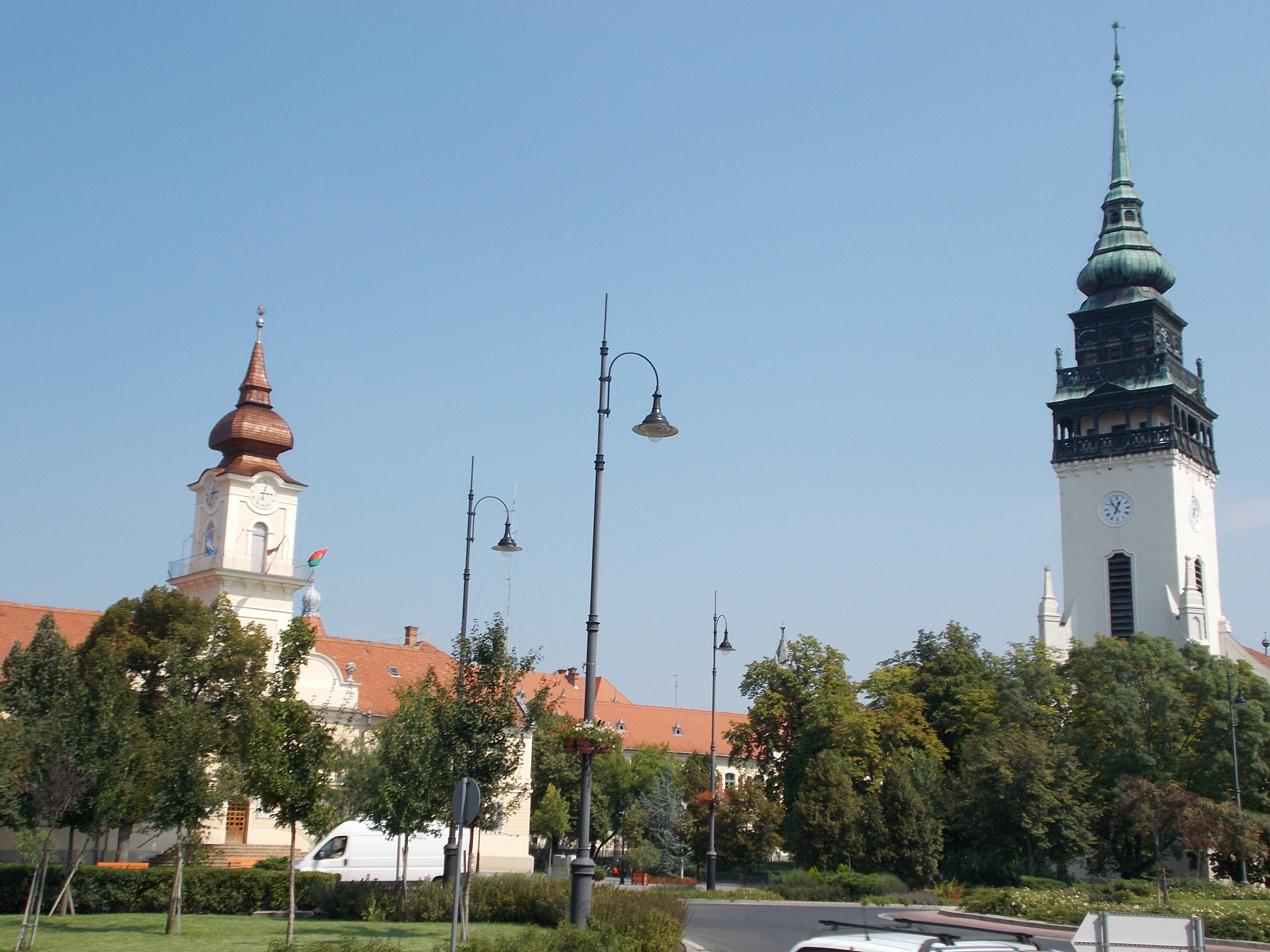
Reformed Church in Nagykőrös

== See also ==
- List of cities and towns in Hungary
