= Nyársapát =

- Flag Coat of arms

- Location of Nyársapát in Hungary
- Coordinates: 47.10121°N 19.80328°E
- Country: Hungary
- Region: Central Hungary
- County: Pest
- Subregion: Ceglédi
- Rank: Village

Area
  - Total: 54.03 km^{2} (20.86 sq mi)

Population (1 January 2008)
  - Total: 1,836
  - Density: 33.98/km^{2} (88.01/sq mi)
- Time zone: UTC+1 (CET)
  - Summer (DST): UTC+2 (CEST)
- Postal code: 2712
- Area code: +36 53
- KSH code: 20066
- Website: www.nyarsapat.hu

Nyársapát (Hungarian pronunciation: [ˈɲaːrʃɒpaːt]) is a village in Pest County, Hungary, on the Great Hungarian Plain between the Danube and the Tisza rivers, approximately 72 km (44 mi) southeast of the Hungarian capital, Budapest.

== Location ==
Nyársapát is surrounded by Cegléd in the north, Nagykőrös in the south, Csemő in the west, and Törtel in the east.
