= Ev-3 (Budapest metro) =

MWM Ev-3
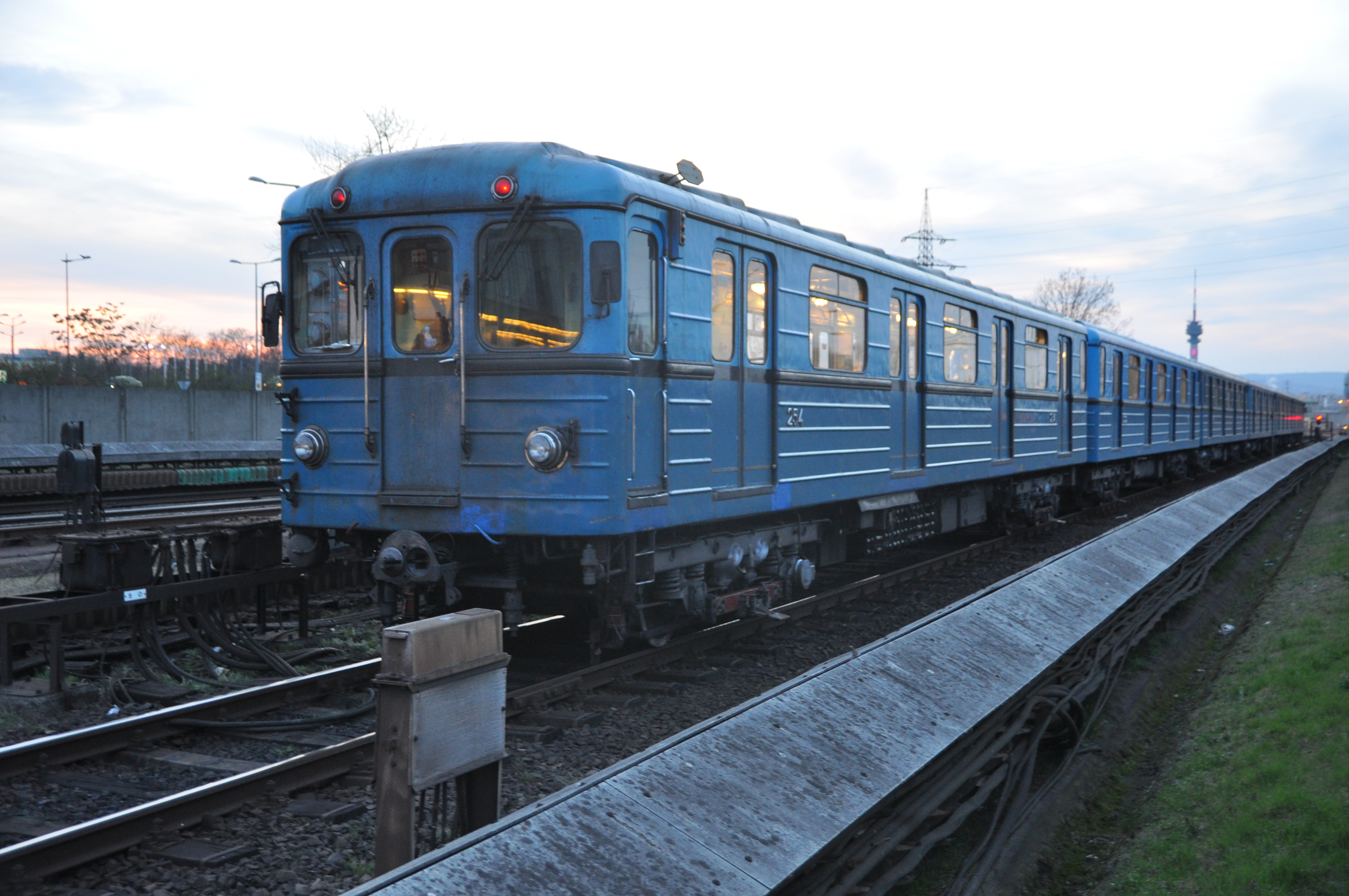
- Stock type: Electric multiple unit
- In service: 1973-2018
- Manufacturer: Mytishchi Machine-Building Plant
- Family name: MWM E-series
- Retired: 2013-2018
- Number built: 95
- Capacity: 264

Specifications
- Wheel diameter: 780 mm
- Maximum speed: 90
- Weight: 33 tonnes (33,000 kg)
- Power output: 72kW
- Acceleration: 1.2 m/s^{2}
- Deceleration: 1.1 m/s^{2}
- Electric system: 780V, third rail
- Seating: Longitudinal
- Track gauge: 1,435 mm (4 ft 8 1/2 in)

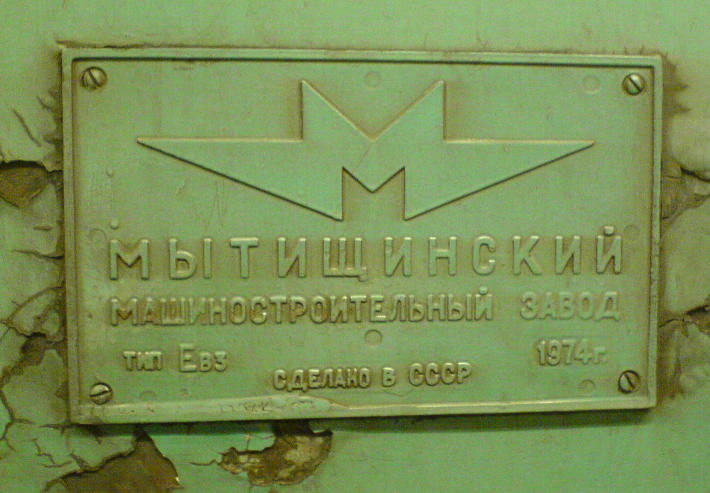
Mytishchi Machine-Building Plant nameplate on an Ev-3

The Ev-3s were a type of subway car used on the Budapest metro system between 1973 and 2018.

The Ev-3 cars were built by Metrowagonmash (previously Mytishchi Machine-Building Plant) between 1975 and 1979. More powerful than the earlier Ev type cars, these trains were outfitted with 72kW engines rather than 66kW ones. Although officially the cars had the same capacity as the Ev type, this number was, in practice, reduced by about 4-5 people due to the utility cabinet situated behind the driver's cab.

All of the Ev-3 cars were retired by 2018, with most of them being used as scrap metal, or refurbished into 81-717.2K/714.2K sets for the M3. However, several cars were bought by private individuals and are currently being used for a variety of purposes, including an art installation at Csakbereny and movie props at Tapioszolos.
