= József Tóth (geographer) =

Hungarian geographer and academic

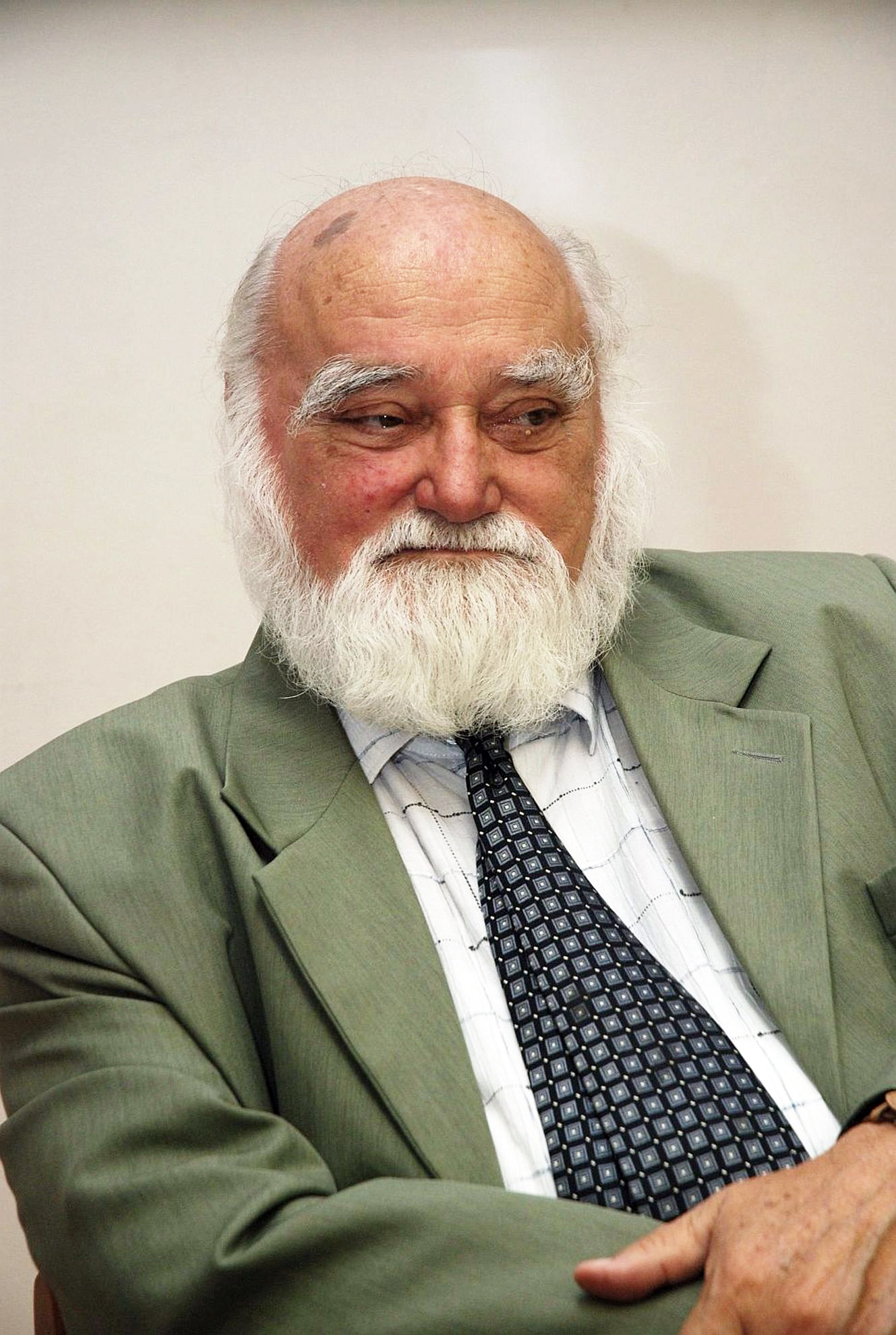
- Born: 18 March 1940; Cegléd, Hungary
- Died: 7 February 2013 (aged 72); Pécs, Hungary
- Occupation: Geographer

József Tóth (18 March 1940 – 7 February 2013) was a Hungarian geographer and academic, who served as Rector of the University of Pécs between 1997 and 2003.

== Selected publications ==
- Az urbanizáció népességföldrajzi vonatkozásai a Dél-Alföldön. A centrumok szerepe a népesség foglalkozási átrétegződésében és területi koncentrálódásában. Földrajzi Tanulmányok 14. Akadémiai Kiadó, Budapest, 1977. p. 142.
- Urbanizáció az Alföldön. Akadémiai Kiadó, Budapest, 1988. p. 200.
- A magyarság kulturális földrajza. Pro Pannonia Kiadói Alapítvány, Pécs, 1997. p. 226. (co-author with András Trócsányi)
- Általános népességföldrajz. Dialóg Campus Kiadó, Budapest–Pécs, 2001.
- A magyarság kulturális földrajza II. Pro Pannonia Kiadó, Pécs, 2002. p. 361. (co-author with András Trócsányi)
