= Mór Vavrinecz =

Mór Vavrinecz (18 July 1858 Cegléd, Hungary – 16 August 1913 Budapest, Austria-Hungary) was a composer, conductor of Matthias Church of Buda, teacher at the Bartók Music Secondary School.

== Biography ==
Mór Vavrinecz was born in Cegléd as a son of a family with Czech origin, whose father was Ignác Vavrinecz, employee of Hungarian Royal Railways and his mother was Erzsébet. He gained his musical knowledge as a self-learner and gathered musical theoretical knowledge based on books. For a short period he was the private student of Róbert Volkmann .

At the age of 28, on 1 October 1886 he was appointed as the conductor of Mathias Church. He took this position up to his death. At the beginning his position was honorific, because the church was under reconstruction led by Frigyes Schulek. Mór Vavrinecz started to act in the Church in 1893, after the end of the reconstruction. At the same time he was the director of Musical School of Budavár. He was a teacher at the Bartók Music Secondary School. From 1901 as acting, from 1902 as an appointed one, where he taught music theory and consonant. His music theory and music critical writings were published in several periodicals.(Fővárosi Lapok, Zeneirodalmi Szemle) jelentek meg.

His major religious and profane operas were successful abroad, while his chamber musics were popular in Hungary as well. His songs which were written in Hungarian, German and Czech were played frequently. He wrote dances as well under the nickname Pali Tánczos. Main parts of his religious music consists of eight masses, from which five include orchestra parts, three include only pipe organ. His masses got international success as well. His most well-known religious works include Missa pastoralis, Karácsonyi mise. and Requiem, which was written to his friend, Anton Koukl’s death. Kouk wrote libretto for one of his first opera, Svitava. Other bigger religious works include Stabat Mater, Christus-oratórium and two Te Deums. Hois musical style is influenced by the German Romanticism and the partially the Czech music. He has personal connection to Bedřich Smetana.

He died at the age of 55 as a result of a serious illness.

== Works ==
His legacy is stored at the musical department of National Széchenyi Library, several of his works and manuscripts are stored at the sheet collection of Matthias Church. Not so much of his non-religious works have been printed at all, several of his works were published by himself. His major labels included Schuberth in Leipzig, Musical Publishing House of Nándor Táborszky and Rózsavölgyi and Co. Publishong House in Budapest.

His works were organised in 1940 by his son, Gábor Vavrinecz, several of the musics are known based on his copies.

=== Operas ===
- Ratcliff (1895, Prague)
- Rosamunda (1895, Frankfurt am Main)
- Éva (1887–1891, based on the Tragedy of Man by Imre Madách, haven't been played.)

=== Religious works ===
- Stabat Mater (1886)
- Requiem
- Krisztus – oratorio
- 8 mise
