= Ácsteszér =

Ácsteszér _{Tesier/Zierndorf}
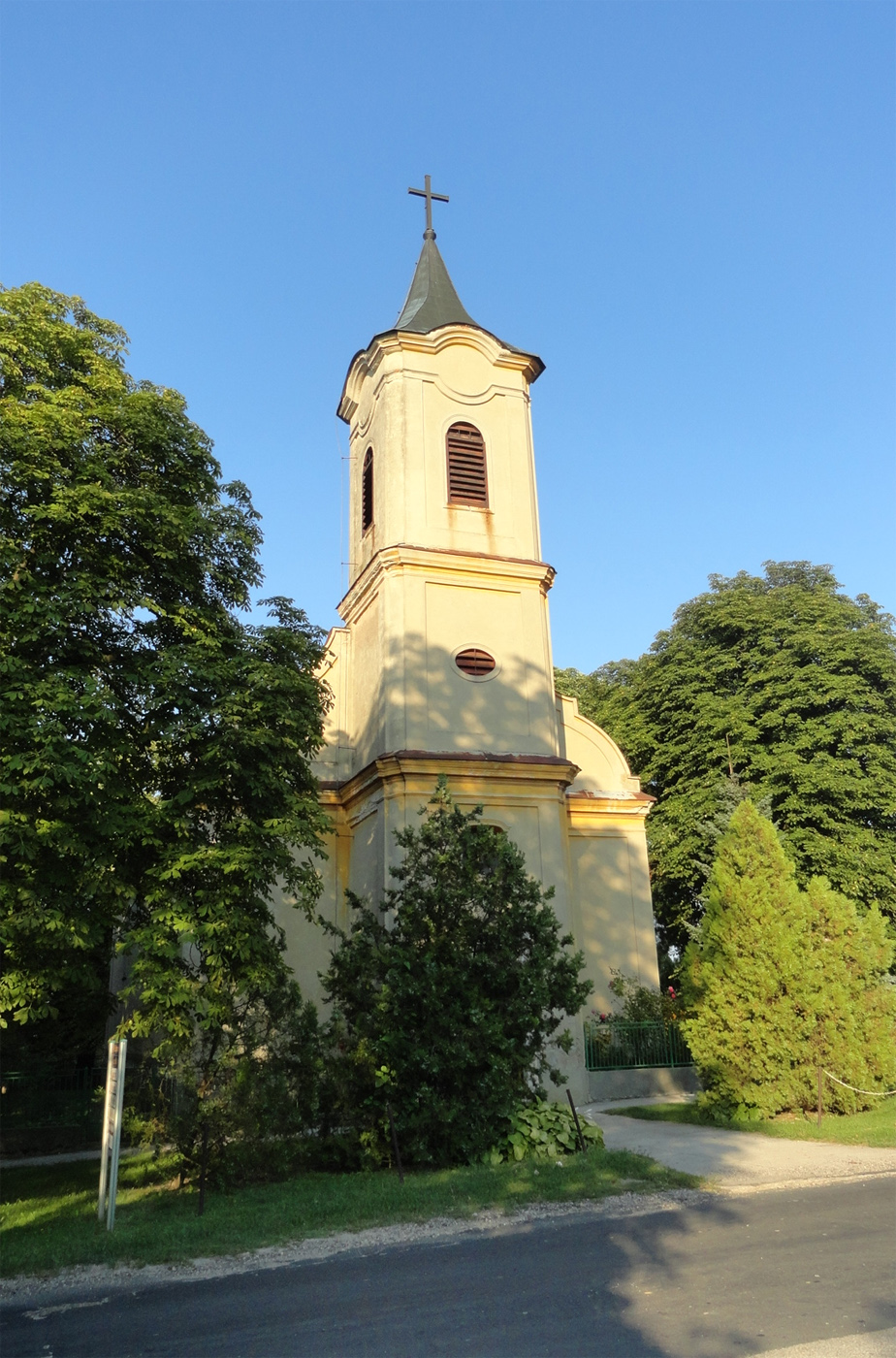
- The Roman Catholic church

- Flag Coat of arms

- Location of Komárom-Esztergom county in Hungary

- Location of Ácsteszér
- Coordinates: 47.40891°N 18.00604°E
- Country: Hungary
- County: Komárom-Esztergom

Area
  - Total: 17.73 km^{2} (6.85 sq mi)

Population (2004)
  - Total: 767
  - Density: 43.26/km^{2} (112.0/sq mi)
- Time zone: UTC+1 (CET)
  - Summer (DST): UTC+2 (CEST)
- Postal code: 2887
- Area code: 34

Ácsteszér (Ács-Teszér, German: Tesier, Zierndorf) is a village in Komárom-Esztergom county, Hungary.

== Etymology ==
The name of the village referred to the profession of the villagers. Hungarian ács and Slavic tesar with the same meaning - a carpenter.

== People ==
- Mihály Táncsics, born here
