= Dánszentmiklós =

- Coat of arms

- Location of Dánszentmiklós in Hungary
- Coordinates: 47.21426°N 19.54339°E
- Country: Hungary
- Region: Central Hungary
- County: Pest
- Subregion: Ceglédi
- Rank: Village

Area
  - Total: 38.01 km^{2} (14.68 sq mi)

Population (1 January 2008)
  - Total: 2,883
  - Density: 75.85/km^{2} (196.4/sq mi)
- Time zone: UTC+1 (CET)
  - Summer (DST): UTC+2 (CEST)
- Postal code: 2735
- Area code: +36 53
- KSH code: 31811
- Website: www.danszentmiklos.hu

Dánszentmiklós is a village in Pest County, Hungary.
