= Mihály Táncsics =

Hungarian writer and politician

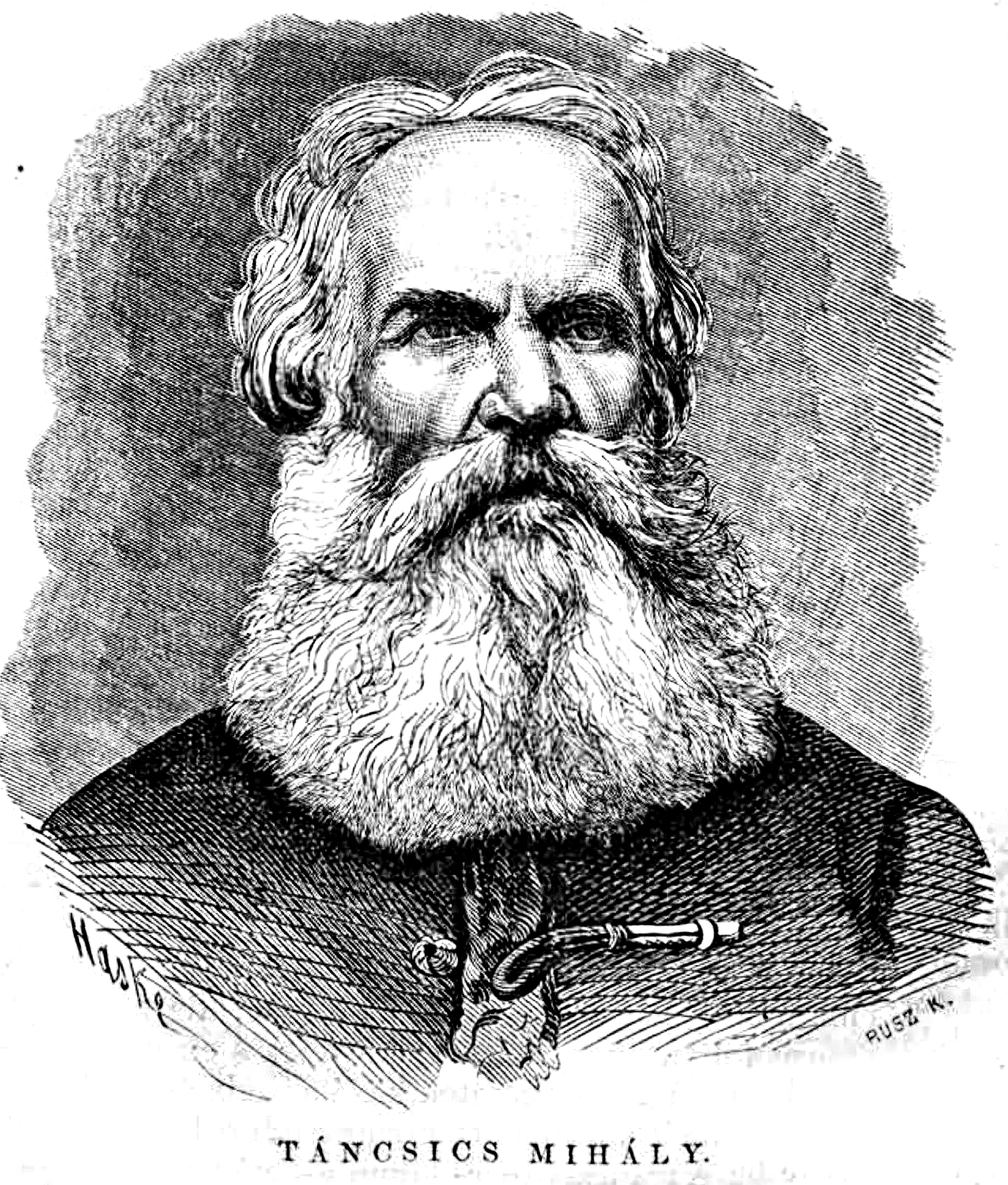
- Born: 21 April 1799; Ácsteszér, Kingdom of Hungary
- Died: 28 June 1884 (aged 85); Budapest, Austria-Hungary
- Political party: Opposition Party (1847–1849)
- Spouse: Teréz Seidel
- Children: Ilka; Etelka; Lajos; Eszter; Kálmán

Mihály Táncsics (Serbian Cyrillic: Михајло Танчић, Mihajlo Tančić; 21 April 1799 – 28 June 1884) was a Hungarian writer, teacher, journalist and politician.

== Life ==
Mihály Táncsics was born on 21 April 1799 in the village of Ácsteszér in the Veszprém county of the Kingdom of Hungary. By his own account, his father was of Croatian antecedents and his mother was of Slovak origin, but he was brought up to be a Hungarian-speaker and an ardent Hungarian. He was incarcerated in Pest for his radical political convictions in 1846. He propagated in his pamphlet The Word of the People Is God's Word, a paraphrase of Vox populi, vox Dei. The pamphlet resulted in his arrest. Táncsics was freed from the Habsburgs's prison on 15 March 1848, the very day when the Hungarian revolution broke out. Although Táncsics's role in the Revolutions of 1848 in the Habsburg areas is highly emphasized in Hungarian history books, however, in literature he does not rank among the great active heroes of these events. He is remembered as someone who is freed rather than someone who liberates others.

As a teacher, Táncsics tirelessly worked to extend elementary education in Hungarian among children and adults in Hungary's urban centres, and his slim textbook on geography with a map of Hungary was part of a large educational project.

== Commemoration ==
He is the namesake of a Hungarian national award for journalism, the Táncsics Prize. In 1948 a Hungarian 20 Forint coin was issued for the Centenary of the 1848 Revolution with his image.

- On 15 March 1947 Hungary issued a postage stamp in his honor in Hungarian Freedom-fighters series.
- On 15 March 1952 Hungary honoured him by a postage stamp in the Freedom-Fighters of 1848 series.
- On 13 March 1998 he was remembered by issuing a postage stamp in the 1848-49 Revolution and War of Independence series.
