= Mikebuda =

- Location of Mikebuda in Hungary
- Coordinates: 47.15681°N 19.61223°E
- Country: Hungary
- Region: Central Hungary
- County: Pest
- Subregion: Ceglédi
- Rank: Village

Area
  - Total: 42.17 km^{2} (16.28 sq mi)

Population (1 January 2008)
  - Total: 741
  - Density: 17.6/km^{2} (45.5/sq mi)
- Time zone: UTC+1 (CET)
  - Summer (DST): UTC+2 (CEST)
- Postal code: 2736
- Area code: +36 53
- KSH code: 24466
- Website: www.mikebuda.hu

Mikebuda is a village in Pest county, Hungary.
