= Ceglédbercel =

- Coat of arms

- Location of Ceglédbercel in Hungary
- Coordinates: 47.22248°N 19.66636°E
- Country: Hungary
- Region: Central Hungary
- County: Pest

Area
  - Total: 2.815 km^{2} (1.087 sq mi)

Population (1 January 2009)
  - Total: 4,440
  - Density: 1,580/km^{2} (4,090/sq mi)
- Time zone: UTC+1 (CET)
  - Summer (DST): UTC+2 (CEST)
- Postal code: 2737
- Area code: +36 53
- KSH code: 20640
- Website: http://www.cegledbercel.hu

Ceglédbercel is a village in Pest County, Hungary.
