= Cegléd =

- Town
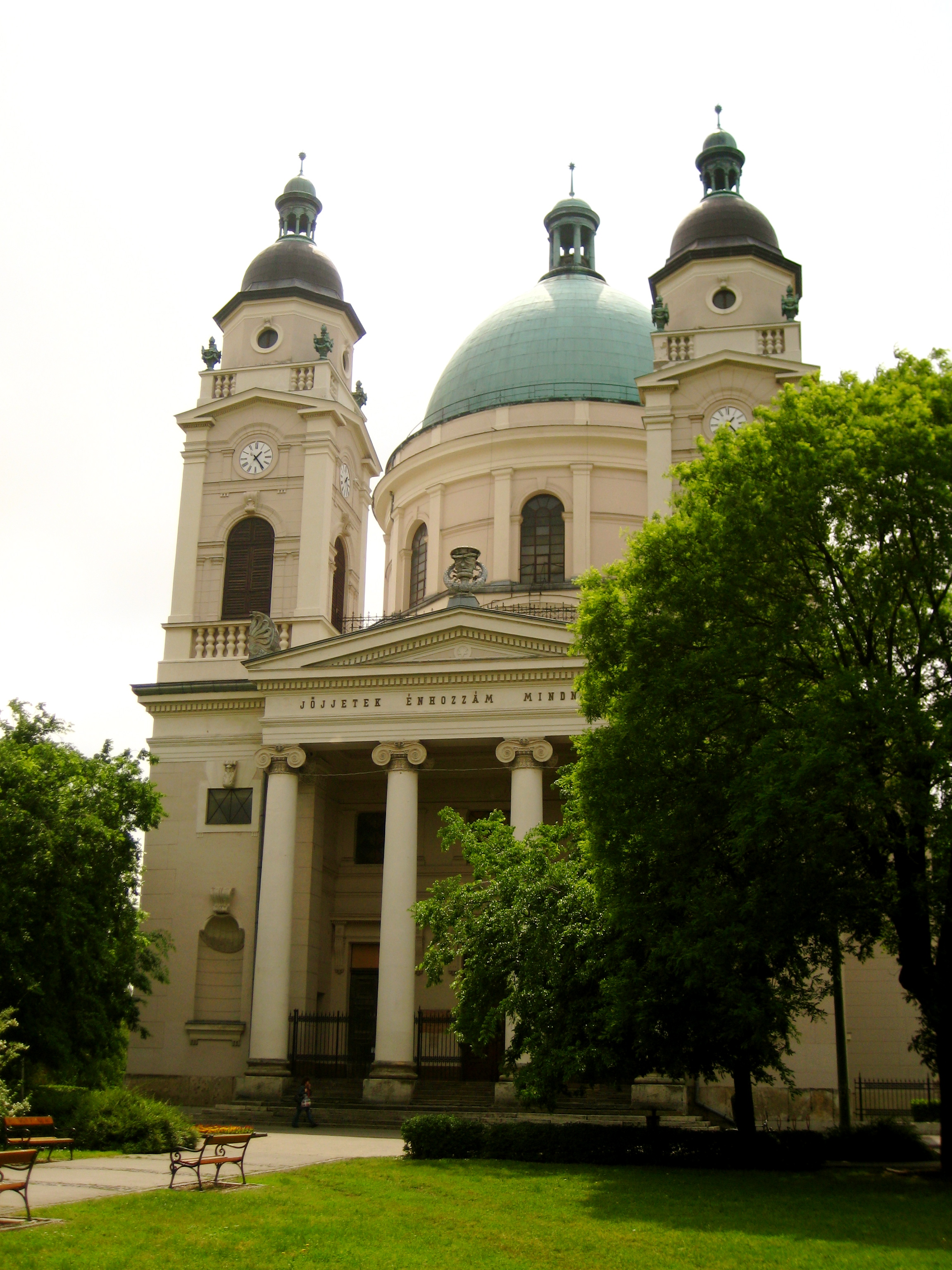
- The Calvinist Great Church

- Flag Coat of arms

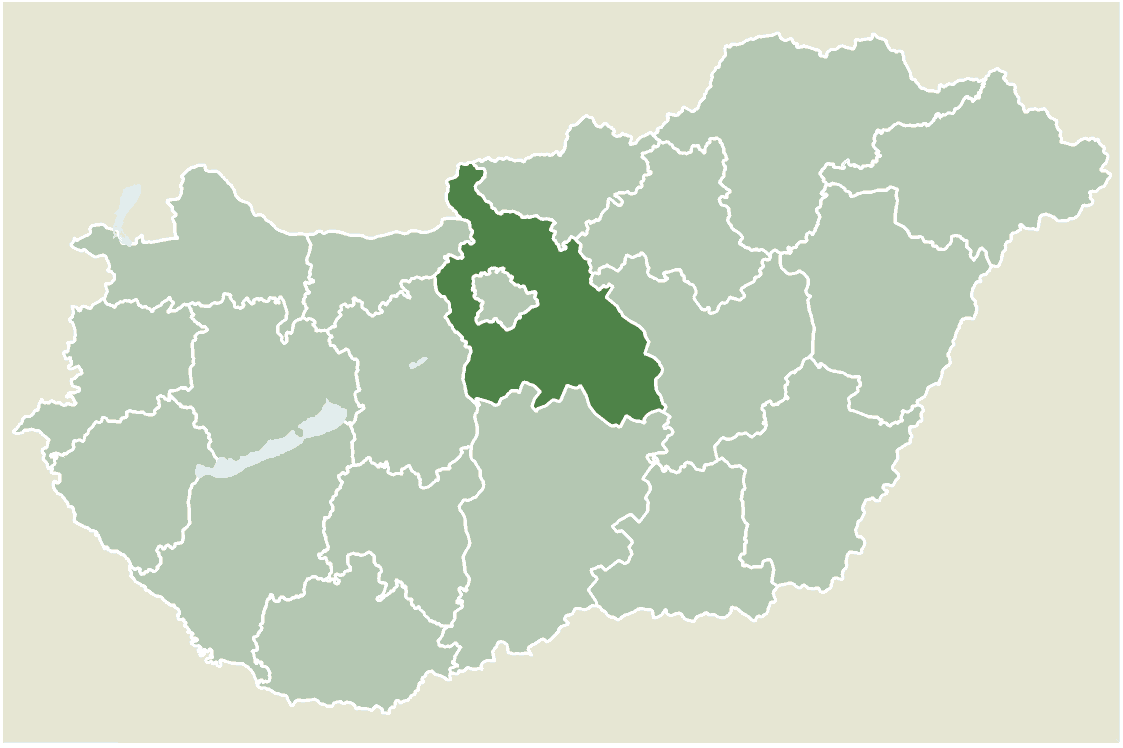
- Location of Pest county in Hungary

- Location of Cegléd Cegléd (Europe)
- Coordinates: 47.17433°N 19.80200°E
- Country: Hungary
- County: Pest
- District: Cegléd

Government
  - Mayor: Dr Csáky András

Area
  - Total: 244.87 km^{2} (94.54 sq mi)

Population (2004)
  - Total: 38,220
  - Density: 156.08/km^{2} (404.2/sq mi)
- Time zone: UTC+1 (CET)
  - Summer (DST): UTC+2 (CEST)
- Postal code: 2700
- Area code: (+36) 53
- Website: cegled.hu

Cegléd (Hungarian pronunciation: [ˈt͡sɛɡleːd]; German: Zieglet) is a city in Pest county, Hungary, approximately 70 km (43 mi) southeast of the Hungarian capital, Budapest.

== Name ==
The name of the town is of disputed origin. The name may be derived from the word "szeglet" (meaning "corner") due to its being a junction point of several important routes, while it may also have been derived from a proper name, i. e. from the name of a man called "Cegléd". The most likely explanation derives the name from the noun "cigle" or "cegle", the old Hungarian name of a riverbank willow.

== History ==
Its area has been inhabited since the Copper Age. It was first mentioned in 1290 in a decree by Ladislaus IV of Hungary. The town prospered under the Árpád dynasty until the 13th century Mongol invasion of Hungary left it in ruins.

It was reinhabitated later, and on May 8, 1364 Louis I of Hungary relieved the town from paying customs. The king gave the town to his queen, Elisabeth, who ceded it to the Clarissa sisters.

During the 1514 György Dózsa peasant uprising, Cegléd was a very important hive for rebellions, and one of the biggest supporters of them. After the catastrophe of the Battle of Mohács (1526) Cegléd came under the power of Bálint Török of Enying.

The Reformation rapidly spread through the town, and the Calvinists owned the old church of the Clarissa-sisters till 1687, when the Turks were forced out.

At the beginning of the 18th century, Cegléd supported the fight for freedom led by Ferenc Rákóczi, although inhabitants were repeatedly forced to flee by Habsburg troops.

After the Treaty of Tolerance, they were allowed to construct a church for themselves and the reformed community. This church was doomed by the Great 1834 Fire. By the next year a new construction was started under the plans of József Hild. The church was finished in 1870, and became the symbol of the town.

The other symbol of Cegléd is Lajos Kossuth. During his 1848 conscription tour, he told his famous speech in the Market Place of Cegléd. By his words more than 5000 men joined his army for the victory. Later his son, Ferenc Kossuth became the deputy of Cegléd in the Hungarian parliament. During the 1848-1849 war of independence, one battle passed next to Cegléd, in Bede (today one of the outskirts of the town), when the revolutionary troops of Mór Perczel defeated the Habsburgs, led by Ottinger. In July 1849, due to the political situation, Cegléd was the seat of the Hungarian revolutionary government for a week.

The golden age of the town were the last years of the 19th and the first ones of the 20th century. The town went through a quick urbanisation, got a secondary school and many important public facilities were built. Cegléd also saw the organisation of the first-ever Hungarian collective farm in 1902 (based on free will back then).

On 29 August 1944, the Cegléd marshalling yard was bombed by 15th AF / 301st BG, which caused damage to the town. However, parks and streets were fairly quickly rebuilt, thanks to the inhabitants.

Jews settled in Cegléd in the first half of the 19th Century, forming a Neologist congregation in 1869 and reaching a peak in 1910. A Jewish school was in operation until the Holocaust and a Synagogue was built in 1905. In 1941 all men in the community were sent to forced labor camps in Ukraine where most died. 659 Jews remained. They were deported to Auschwitz after being expelled to Kecskemet in June 1944. In 1946 150 survivors reestablished the community.

During the 1956 revolution, for a couple of days Cegléd was governed by revolutionary forces, organised mainly by pupils of the local Kossuth Lajos Secondary School.

During the Communist regime, agriculture and light industry were made priorities, and after the fall of the regime, these features started to decline, and many of the inhabitants moved to bigger towns. Today, however, the town seems to have refound itself on the base of tourism and its thermal water.

== Geography ==
Cegléd is situated between the Duna and Tisza rivers, north of Kiskunság, at the western part of the Great Hungarian Plain. Due to its location, it is often called "the gate of the Great Plain". A shoulder of the Gödöllő hills runs along the western part of the town.

The Gerje stream crosses the southern part of Cegléd. The town is surrounded by farmland producing mostly fruit (plums, cherries and apricot) and vegetables (yellow peppers) and has several outskirts with scattered cottages.

== Places of interest ==
One of the known features of Cegléd is its richness in thermal water. At the outskirts of the town, there is a thermal spa. Best Western Hotel Aquarell Cegled is located near the city's Thermal Bath and Aquapark.

Locals traditionally held that the town has the biggest Calvinist church in Central Europe, but this is disputed. The church of Debrecen is bigger by square footage, while the Cegléd church seems to be bigger by volume.

In the downtown, at Szabadság tér (Liberty Square) stands a statue of Lajos Kossuth, the replica of which can be found in New York City. At the same square, there is the Museum of Drums, Cegléd being a town with vivid jazz life, featuring also the annual Drum and Percussion Gala, that attracts interest from all over Hungary and even from abroad. From 1992, for over 20 years, the town was also home to the Bori Jazz festival.

The memory of Lajos Kossuth is also conserved by the Kossuth Museum, as well as the so-called Kossuth's Balcony - the balcony of the former Green Tree hotel in Bratislava, from which Kossuth made a speech on the eve of the 1848 Hungarian revolution, and which is today standing next to the Calvinist church of Cegléd.

The city hall is constructed in an eclectic style, reflecting the taste of the early 20th century.

The Lutheran church is built in neogothic style, while the Catholic Church (Church of the Blessing of the Holy Cross) is a classicist one.

Cegléd has five secondary schools: József Bem Polytechnic Vocational High School, László Ungvári High School of Commerce and Tourism, Lajos Kossuth Secondary Grammar School, János Török Vocational High School of Health Care and Agriculture, and Cegléd High School of Informatics and Economics

As well as the Ferenc Erkel Music School.

== Cultural life and local media ==
Cegléd has a community cultural centre called Cultural Palace or Kossuth Community Centre, originally built by the Cegléd Craftsmen's Union in eclectic style. The centre has a theater, where many acting companies have played. Cegléd also has its own acting company and acting school named after the famous actress Irma Patkós, who lived in Cegléd. The centre gives place to the Cegléd Gallery, where mainly photos and paintings of local artists can be seen.

The town features the annual Drum and Percussion Gala, which is a jazz event, as well as numerous jazz concerts throughout every year.

Founding members of the popular Hungarian rock band hu:Zanzibar are from Cegléd.

The musical life of the town is also made colourful by the Ferenc Erkel conservatory and the Mihály Táncsics Primary School, where the teaching of music and singing is done by the Kodály-method.

The town has two local television channels, Cegléd TV is backed by the local authority, while Club TV is a commercial one. The local radio station is called "Cegléd Rádió" (formerly Rádió 88).

As for the printed media, Cegléd has a weekly local paper called Kék Újság (Blue Newspaper), as well as a magazine, Ceglédi Panoráma (Panorama of Cegléd). A periodical cultural review used to appear under the name "Gerjepart" (Bank of the Gerje).

== Sport ==
The town's football team is Ceglédi VSE.

== Transport ==
The main road number 4 passes Cegléd towards Budapest to the Northwest, and Debrecen to the East, while the road number 441 connects the town with Kecskemét. The closest connection to a highway can be reached near Albertirsa, some 15 kilometres (9 miles) Northwest of Cegléd, where the highway M5 passes.

The town features a direct connection to Budapest via train, also being a junction point of the Nyíregyháza and Szeged lines.

== Notable residents ==
- Erika Csomor (b. 1973), triathlete
- György Csordás (1928 - 2000), freestyle swimmer
- György Czerván (b. 1959), politician
- Ronald Erős (b. 1993), footballer
- Péter Farkas (b. 1987), footballer
- Gergely Nagy (b. 1994), footballer
- George Pal (1908 - 1980), animator and filmmaker
- István Pásztor (b. 1971), handball player
- Rajmond Toricska (b. 1993), footballer
- József Tóth (1940 - 2013), geographer
- Mór Vavrinecz (1858-1913), composer and conductor

== Twin towns – sister cities ==
Cegléd is twinned with:

- Gheorgheni, Romania
- Miercurea Ciuc, Romania
- Mühldorf, Germany
- Odorheiu Secuiesc, Romania
- Plauen, Germany
- Sfântu Gheorghe, Romania
- Vasvár, Hungary
- Vlăhița, Romania

== See also ==
- Cegléd water jug
