= Pest County =

County of Hungary

Coordinates: 47°25′N 19°20′E

Pest County Pest megye
- County
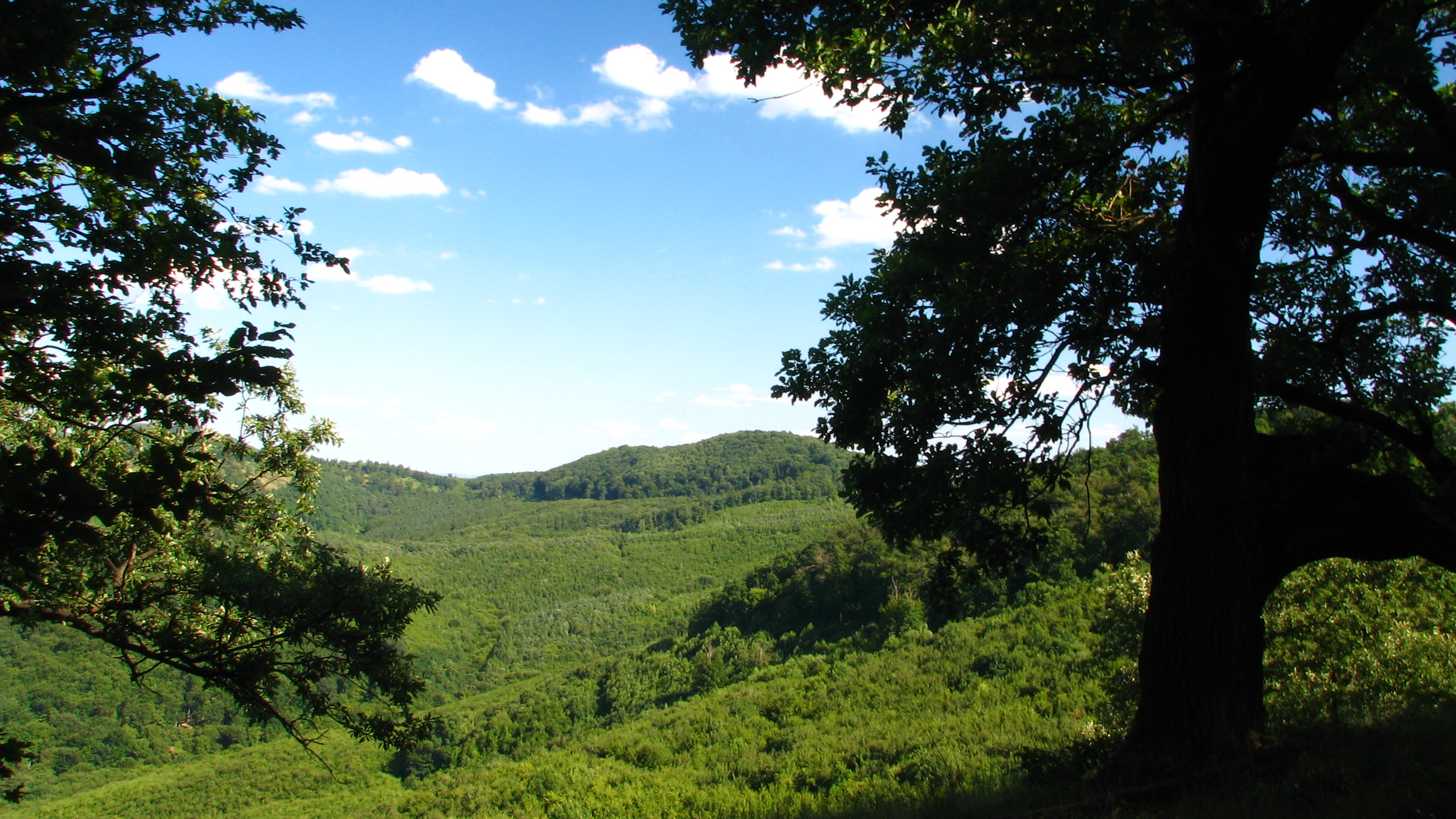
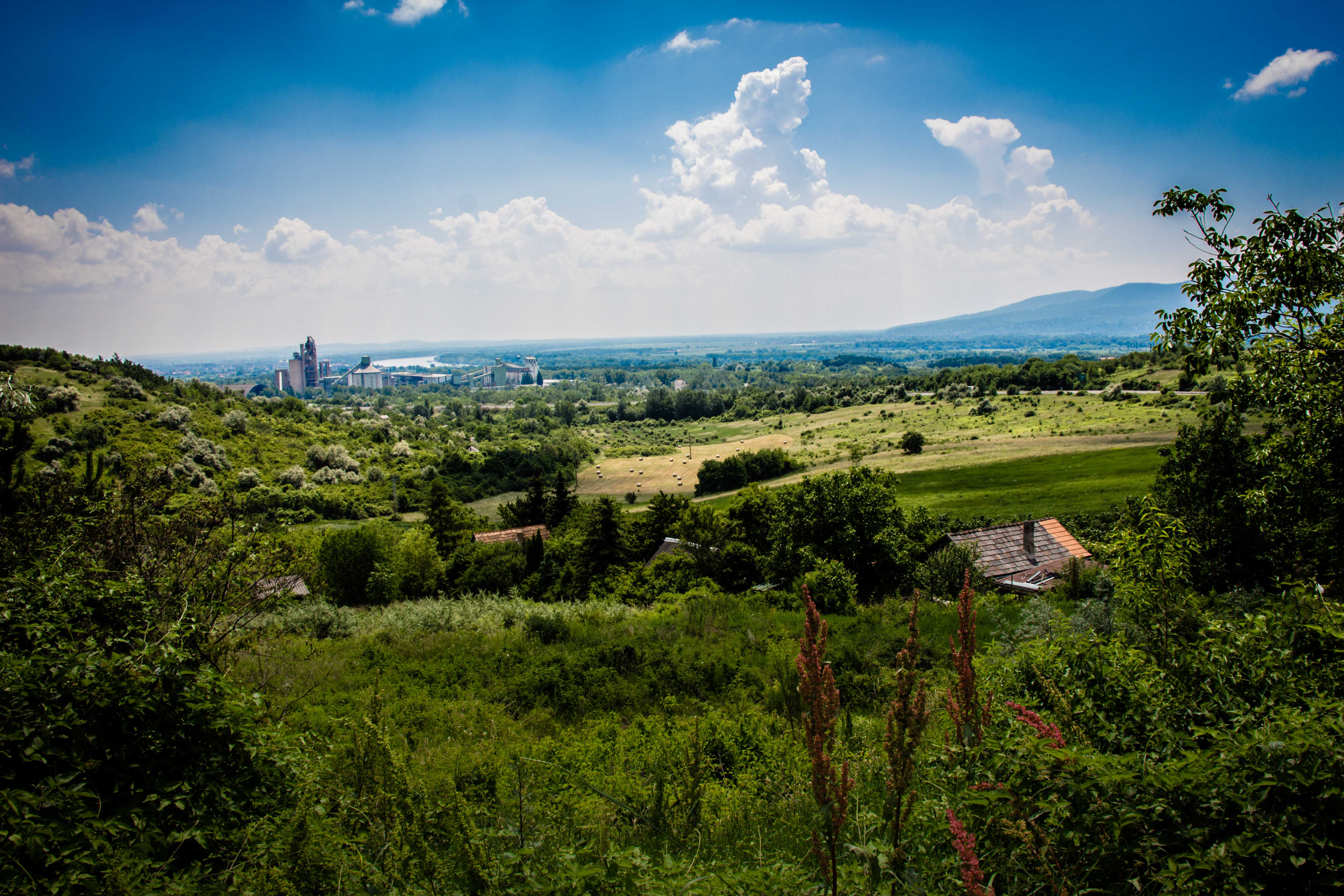
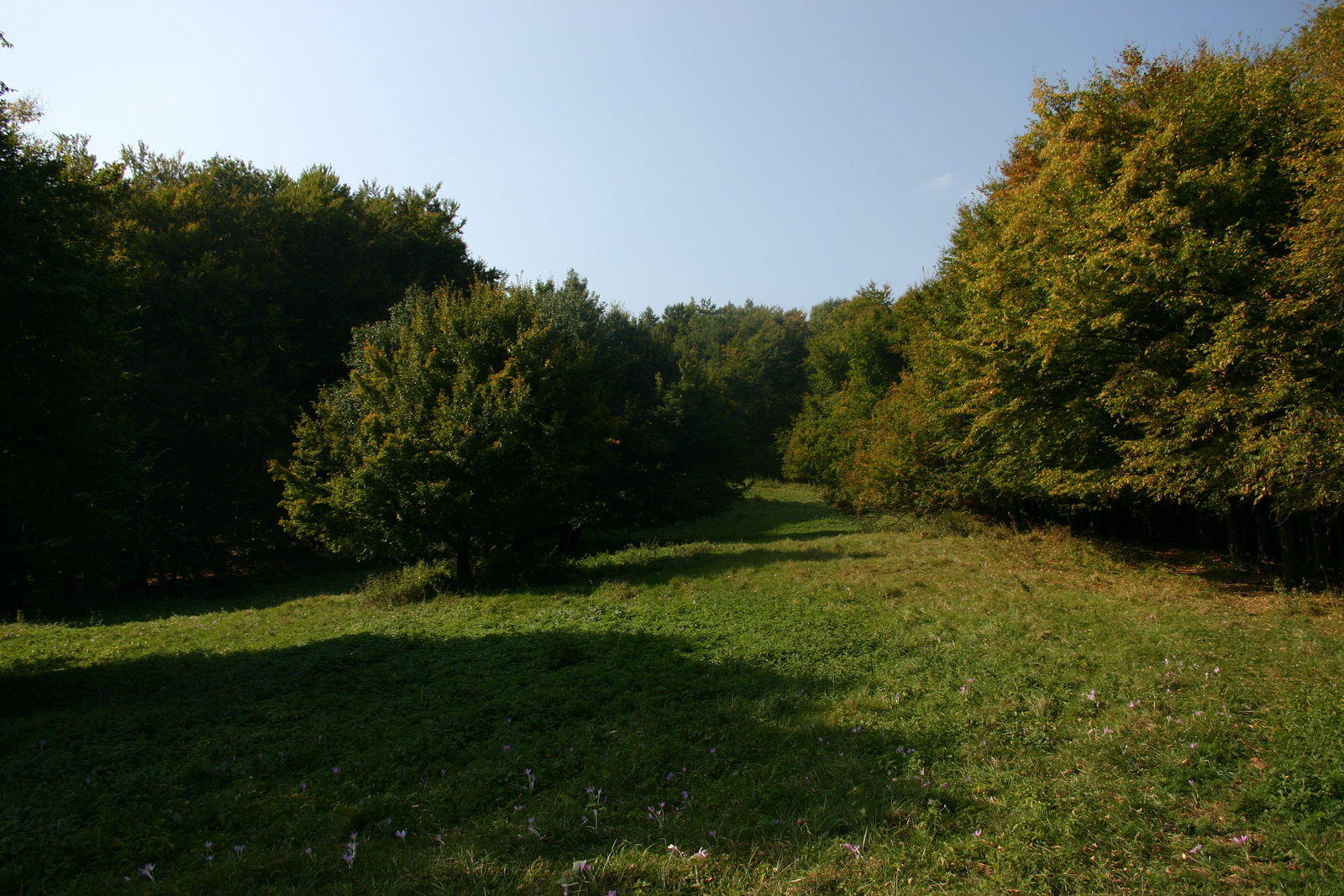
- Clockwise, from top: the Börzsöny Mountain in Nagybörzsöny village, landscape of Kemence, and landscape of Vác

- Flag Coat of arms

- Pest County within Hungary
- Interactive map of Pest County
- Country: Hungary
- Region: Central Hungary
- County seat: Budapest
- Districts: 18 districts: Aszód District; Budakeszi District; Cegléd District; Dabas District; Dunakeszi District; Érd District; Gödöllő District; Gyál District; Monor District; Nagykáta District; Nagykőrös District; Pilisvörösvár District; Ráckeve District; Szentendre District; Szigetszentmiklós District; Szob District; Vác District; Vecsés District

Government
  - President of the General Assembly: István Szabó (Fidesz-KDNP)

Area
  - Total: 6,393.14 km^{2} (2,468.41 sq mi)
  - Rank: 3rd in Hungary

Population (2023)
  - Total: 1,339,000
  - Rank: 1st in Hungary
  - Density: 191.8/km^{2} (497/sq mi)

GDP
  - Total: €24.190 billion (2024)
  - Per capita: €18,106 (2024)
- Postal code: 20xx – 23xx, 2440, 2461, 260x – 263x, 2680 – 2683, 27xx
- Area code(s): (+36) 23, 24, 26, 27, 28, 29, 53
- ISO 3166 code: HU-PE
- Website: pestmegye.hu

Pest (Hungarian: Pest megye, pronounced [ˈpɛʃt]; German: Komitat Pest) is a county (megye) in central Hungary. It covers an area of 6,393.14 square kilometres (2,468.41 sq mi), and has a population of 1,339,090 (2023). The suburbs of Budapest surrounds the national capital Budapest and is the county's largest administrative unit (13.8%/1.3 million in 2013). It shares borders with Slovakia and the Hungarian counties Nógrád, Heves, Jász-Nagykun-Szolnok, Bács-Kiskun, Fejér, and Komárom-Esztergom. The River Danube flows through the county. The capital of Pest County is Budapest, although Budapest is not part of Pest County. Starting 2018, they also constitute different NUTS:HU level 2 regions, as previously Pest County has lost catch-up aids from the European Union because of the high development of Budapest.

== History ==
The present county Pest was formed after World War II, when the former county Pest-Pilis-Solt-Kiskun was split in two parts (the other part is within present-day Bács-Kiskun). Pest County also existed in the early days of the medieval Kingdom of Hungary (11th century). Its territory comprised approximately the north-eastern part of present Pest County. It was combined with adjacent Pilis county before the 15th century. More information can be found at the entry of former Pest-Pilis-Solt-Kiskun county.

== Demographics ==
Religion in Pest County (2022 census – of those who declared their religion (58.6%))
1. Roman Catholic (45.5%)
2. Calvinistic (16.3%)
3. Lutheran (3.80%)
4. Greek Catholic (1.60%)
5. Baptist (0.60%)
6. Other Christian denomination (4.10%)
7. Other religion (0.60%)
8. Not religious (27.5%)

In 2015, it had a population of 1,226,115 and the population density was 192/km^{2}.

Historical population
Year	Pop.	±%
1870	330,089	—
1880	353,851	+7.2%
1890	395,142	+11.7%
1900	450,136	+13.9%
1910	524,320	+16.5%
1920	571,753	+9.0%
1930	633,257	+10.8%
1941	682,696	+7.8%
1949	686,953	+0.6%
1960	781,505	+13.8%
1970	878,644	+12.4%
1980	973,830	+10.8%
1990	949,842	−2.5%
2001	1,083,877	+14.1%
2011	1,217,476	+12.3%
2021	1,333,533	+9.5%

=== Ethnicity ===
Besides the Hungarian majority, the main minorities are the Germans (approx. 25,000), Roma (20,000), Slovaks (6,000), Romanians (4,000) and Serbs (1,500).

Total population (2011 census): 1,217,476
Ethnic groups (2011 census): Identified themselves: 1,090,882 persons:

- Hungarians: 1,024,768 (93.94%)
- Germans: 24,994 (2.29%)
- Romani: 20,065 (1.84%)
- Others and indefinable: 21,055 (1.93%)

Approx. 178,000 persons in Pest County did not declare their ethnic group at the 2011 census.

=== Religion ===
Religious adherence in the county according to 2011 census:

- Catholic – 445,106 (Roman Catholic – 435,717; Greek Catholic – 9,235);
- Reformed – 134,848;
- Evangelical – 32,564;
- Orthodox – 1,796;
- Judaism – 947;
- Other religions – 26,485;
- Non-religious – 200,430;
- Atheism – 19,869;
- Undeclared – 355,431.

== Economy ==
The Gross domestic product (GDP) of the county was 13.8 billion euros in 2018, accounting for 10.3% of Hungary's economic output. GDP per capita adjusted for purchasing power was 17,000 euros or 56% of the EU27 average in the same year. The GDP per employee was 69% of the EU average.

== Regional structure ==
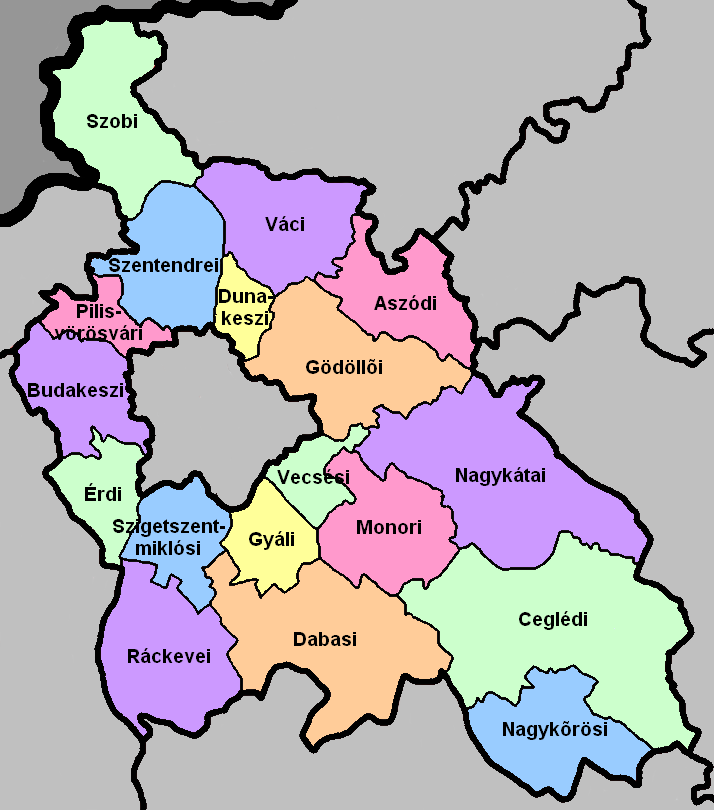
District of Pest County

No.	English and Hungarian names	Area (km^{2})	Population (2011)	Density (pop./km^{2})	Seat	No. of municipalities
1	Aszód District; Aszódi járás	298.37	37,472	126	Aszód	11
2	Budakeszi District; Budakeszi járás	288.95	83,670	290	Budakeszi	12
3	Cegléd District; Ceglédi járás	886.30	88,952	100	Cegléd	12
4	Dabas District; Dabasi járás	614.23	48,289	79	Dabas	11
5	Dunakeszi District; Dunakeszi járás	103.08	78,634	763	Dunakeszi	4
6	Érd District; Érdi járás	184.29	116,510	632	Érd	7
7	Gödöllő District; Gödöllői járás	449.66	139,826	311	Gödöllő	15
8	Gyál District; Gyáli járás	170.99	40,853	239	Gyál	4
9	Monor District; Monori járás	329.81	64,016	194	Monor	12
10	Nagykáta District; Nagykátai járás	710.12	73,959	104	Nagykáta	15
11	Nagykőrös District; Nagykőrösi járás	349.25	27,977	80	Nagykőrös	3
12	Pilisvörösvár District; Pilisvörösvári járás	130.81	53,201	407	Pilisvörösvár	9
13	Ráckeve District; Ráckevei járás	417.05	35,732	86	Ráckeve	11
14	Szentendre District; Szentendrei járás	326.58	77,802	238	Szentendre	13
15	Szigetszentmiklós District; Szigetszentmiklósi járás	211.28	110,448	523	Szigetszentmiklós	9
16	Szob District; Szobi járás	438.32	24,875	57	Szob	17
17	Vác District; Váci járás	362.19	68,234	188	Vác	18
18	Vecsés District; Vecsési járás	119.74	47,026	393	Vecsés	4
Pest County		6,393.14	1,217,476	192	Budapest	187

== Politics ==
The Pest County Council, elected at the 2024 local government elections, is made up of 46 counselors, with the following party composition:

Party	Seats	Current County Assembly
Fidesz-KDNP	21	
Momentum Movement	10	
Our Homeland Movement	8	
Democratic Coalition	7	

== Municipalities ==
Pest County has 1 urban county, 47 towns, 17 large villages and 122 villages.

City with county rights

(ordered by population, as of 2011 census)

- Érd (63,631)

Towns

- Dunakeszi (40,545)
- Cegléd (36,645)
- Szigetszentmiklós (34,708)
- Vác (33,831)
- Gödöllő (32,522)
- Budaörs (26,757)
- Szentendre (25,310)
- Nagykőrös (24,134)
- Gyál (23,338)
- Dunaharaszti (20,473)
- Vecsés (20,088)
- Fót (19,068)
- Százhalombatta (17,952)
- Monor (17,626)
- Göd (17,476)
- Szigethalom (16,886)
- Pomáz (16,622)
- Dabas (16,386)
- Gyömrő (16,250)
- Veresegyház (15,998)
- Pécel (15,168)
- Abony (14,916)
- Pilisvörösvár (13,667)
- Budakeszi (13,502)
- Törökbálint (12,841)
- Biatorbágy (12,484)
- Nagykáta (12,467)
- Albertirsa (12,016)
- Kistarcsa (11,953)
- Maglód (11,738)
- Pilis (11,568)
- Üllő (11,425)
- Isaszeg (11,152)
- Tököl (10,851)
- Budakalász (10,619)
- Kerepes (10,068)
- Ráckeve (9,755)
- Halásztelek (9,200)
- Diósd (9,056)
- Ócsa (8,985)
- Piliscsaba (8,472)
- Sülysáp (8,195)
- Tura (7,774)
- Dunavarsány (7,363)
- Őrbottyán (7,102)
- Aszód (6,258)
- Tápiószele (5,914)
- Zsámbék (5,174)
- Örkény (4,730)
- Nagymaros (4,679)
- Szob (2,794)
- Újhartyán (2,685)
- Visegrád (1,718)

Villages

- Acsa
- Alsónémedi
- Apaj
- Áporka
- Bag
- Bénye
- Bernecebaráti
- Budajenő
- Bugyi
- Ceglédbercel
- Csemő
- Csévharaszt
- Csobánka
- Csomád
- Csömör
- Csörög
- Csővár
- Dánszentmiklós
- Dány
- Délegyháza
- Domony
- Dömsöd
- Dunabogdány
- Ecser
- Erdőkertes
- Farmos
- Felsőpakony
- Galgagyörk
- Galgahévíz
- Galgamácsa
- Gomba
- Herceghalom
- Hernád
- Hévízgyörk
- Iklad
- Inárcs
- Ipolydamásd
- Ipolytölgyes
- Jászkarajenő
- Kakucs
- Kartal
- Káva
- Kemence
- Kiskunlacháza
- Kismaros
- Kisnémedi
- Kisoroszi
- Kocsér
- Kosd
- Kóka
- Kőröstetétlen
- Kóspallag
- Leányfalu
- Letkés
- Lórév
- Majosháza
- Makád
- Márianosztra
- Mende
- Mikebuda
- Mogyoród
- Monorierdő
- Nagybörzsöny
- Nagykovácsi
- Nagytarcsa
- Nyáregyháza
- Nyársapát
- Pánd
- Páty
- Penc
- Perbál
- Perőcsény
- Péteri
- Pilisborosjenő
- Pilisjászfalu
- Pilisszántó
- Pilisszentiván
- Pilisszentkereszt
- Pilisszentlászló
- Pócsmegyer
- Pusztavacs
- Pusztazámor
- Püspökhatvan
- Püspökszilágy
- Rád
- Remeteszőlős
- Solymár
- Sóskút
- Szada
- Szentlőrinckáta
- Szentmártonkáta
- Szigetbecse
- Szigetcsép
- Szigetmonostor
- Szigetszentmárton
- Szigetújfalu
- Szokolya
- Sződ
- Sződliget
- Tahitótfalu
- Taksony
- Tatárszentgyörgy
- Táborfalva
- Tápióbicske
- Tápiógyörgye
- Tápióság
- Tápiószecső
- Tápiószentmárton
- Tápiószőlős
- Tárnok
- Telki
- Tésa
- Tinnye
- Tóalmás
- Tök
- Törtel
- Újlengyel
- Újszilvás
- Úri
- Üröm
- Valkó
- Vasad
- Vácduka
- Vácegres
- Váchartyán
- Váckisújfalu
- Vácrátót
- Vácszentlászló
- Vámosmikola
- Verőce
- Verseg
- Zebegény
- Zsámbok

municipalities are large villages.

== Gallery ==
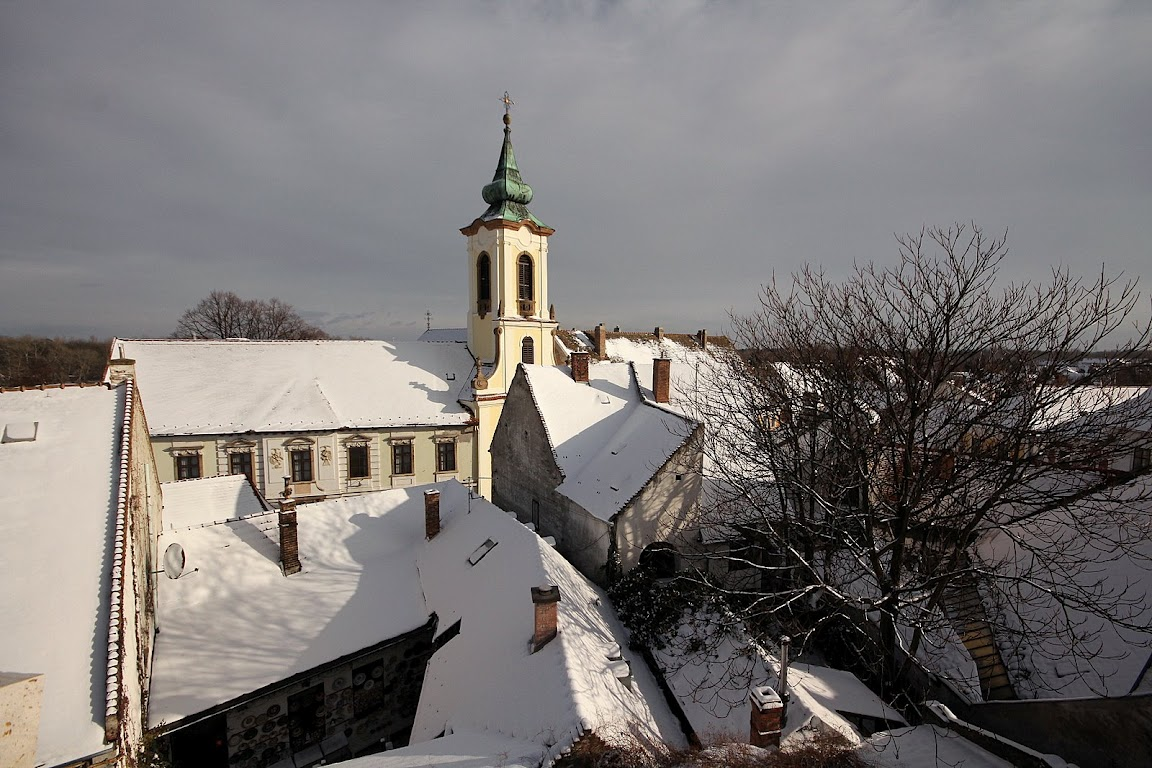
View of Szentendre

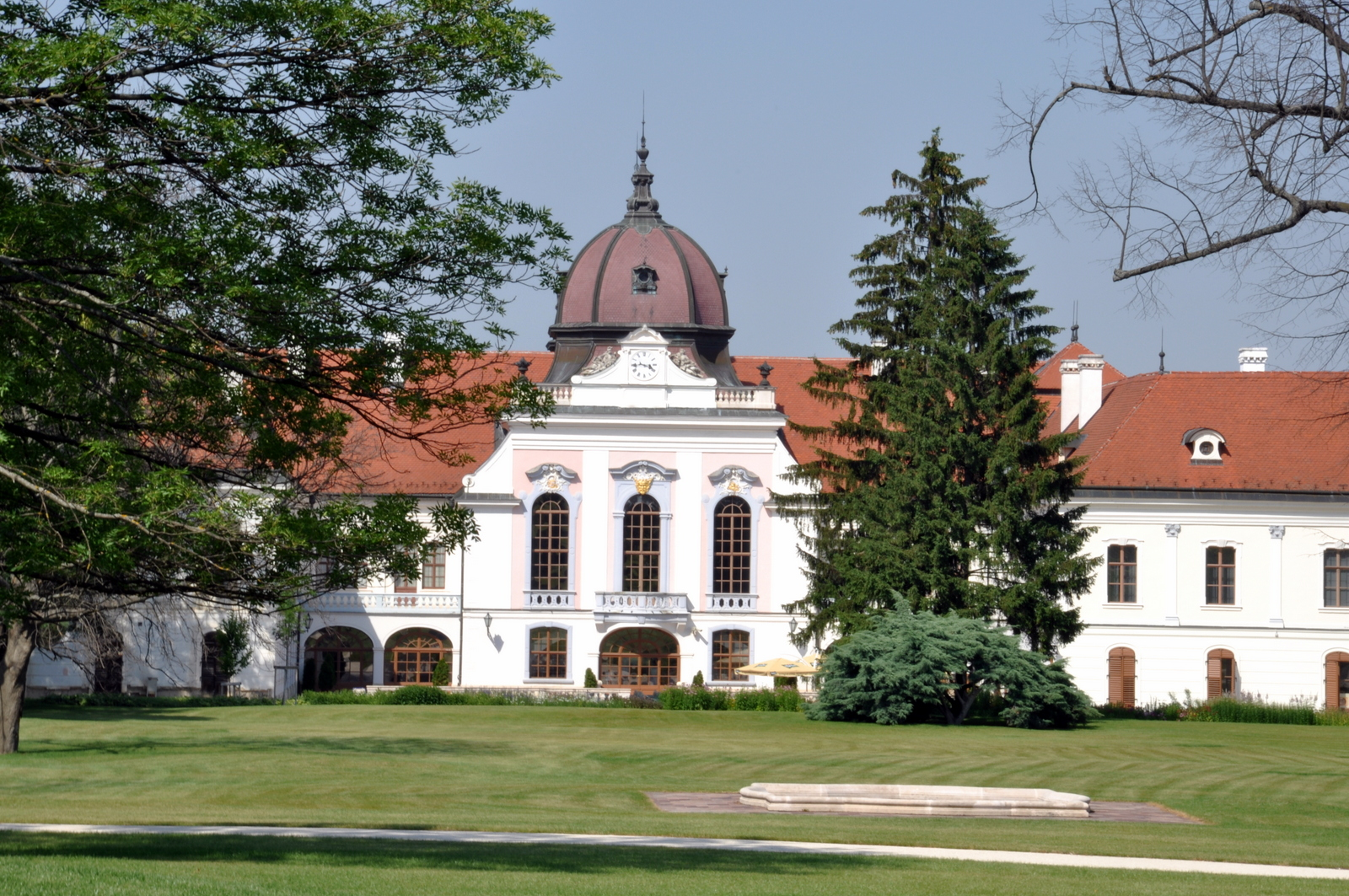
Grassalkovich Palace in Gödöllő

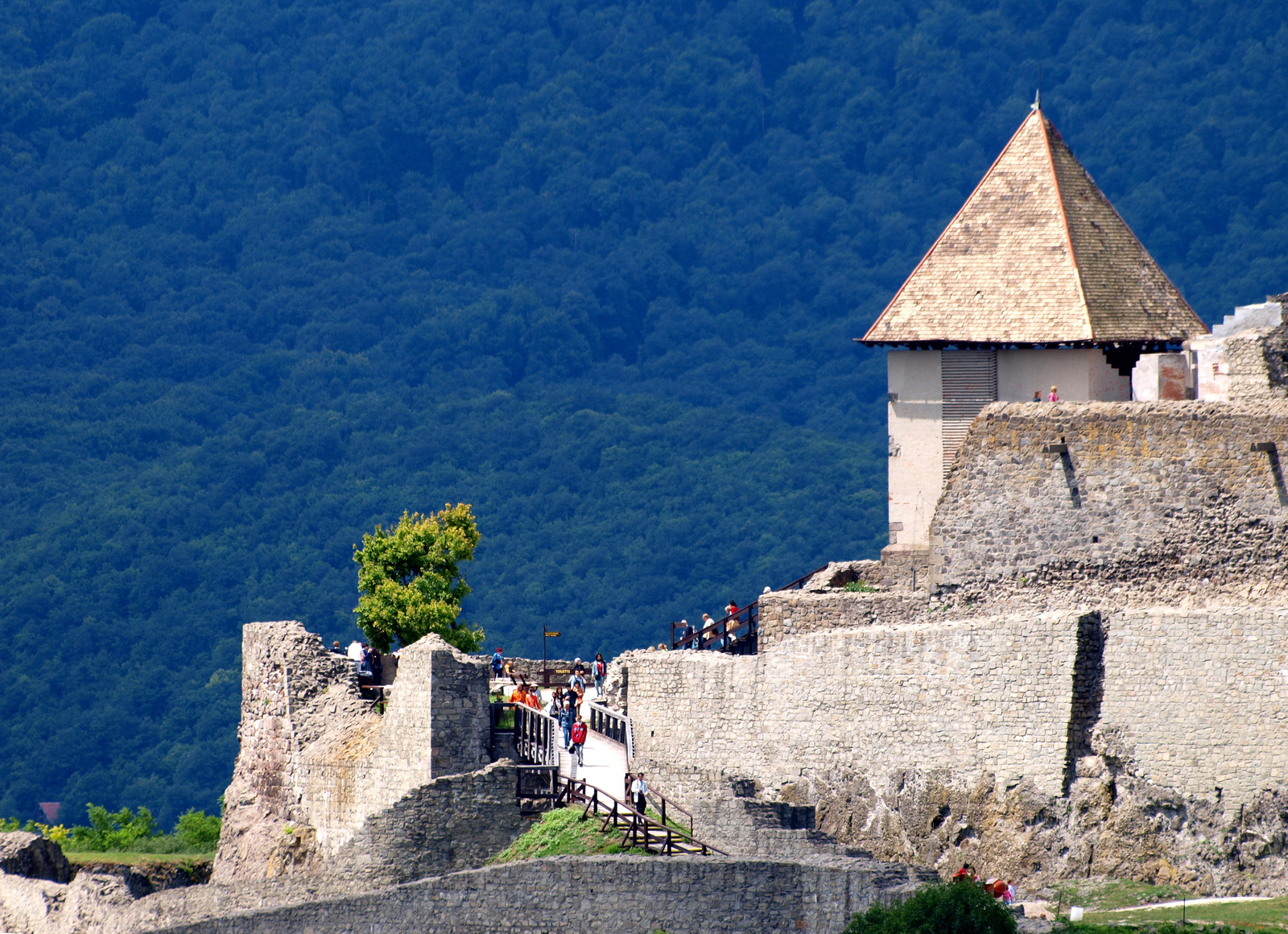
Citadel of Visegrád

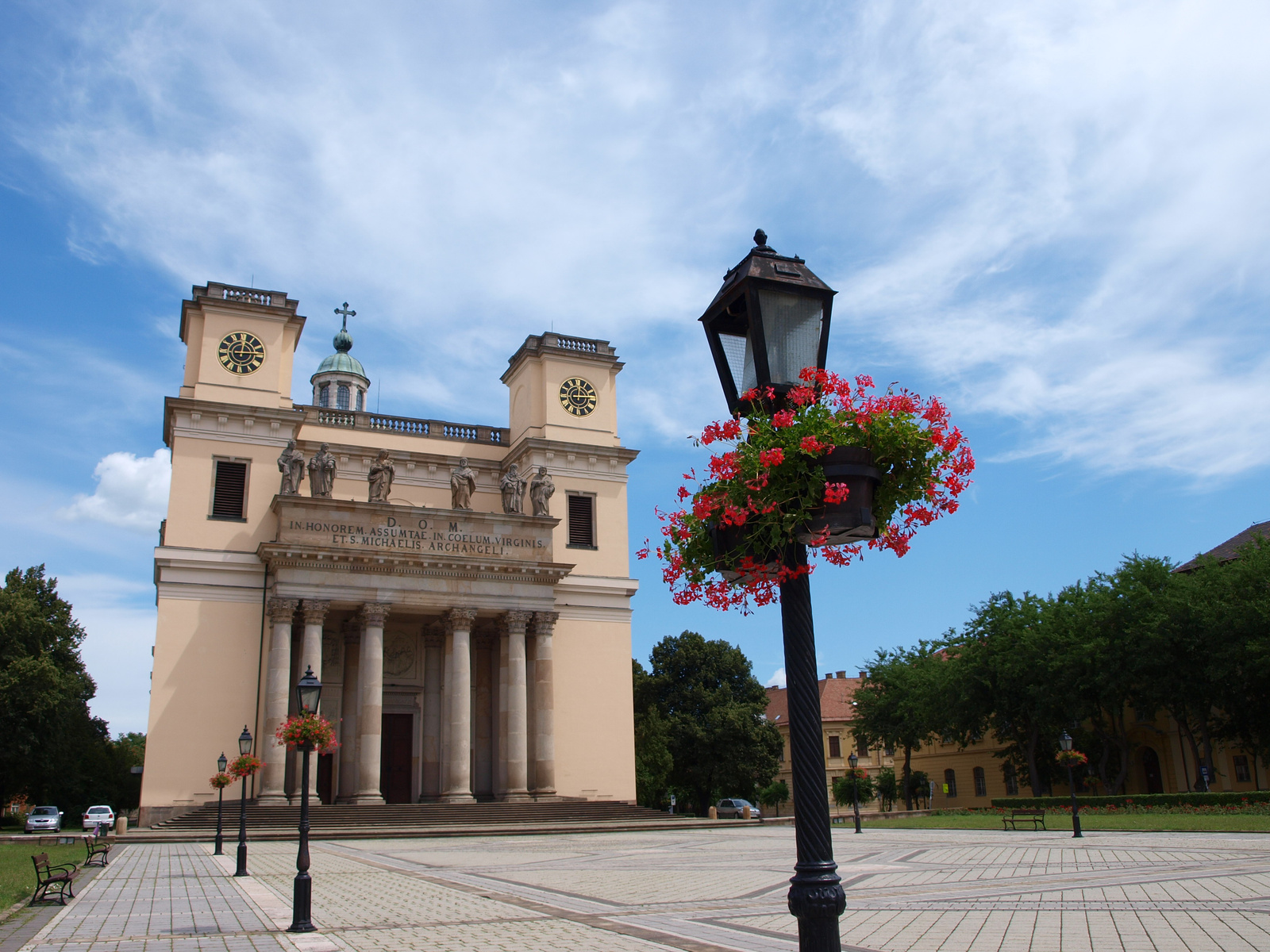
Cathedral in Vác

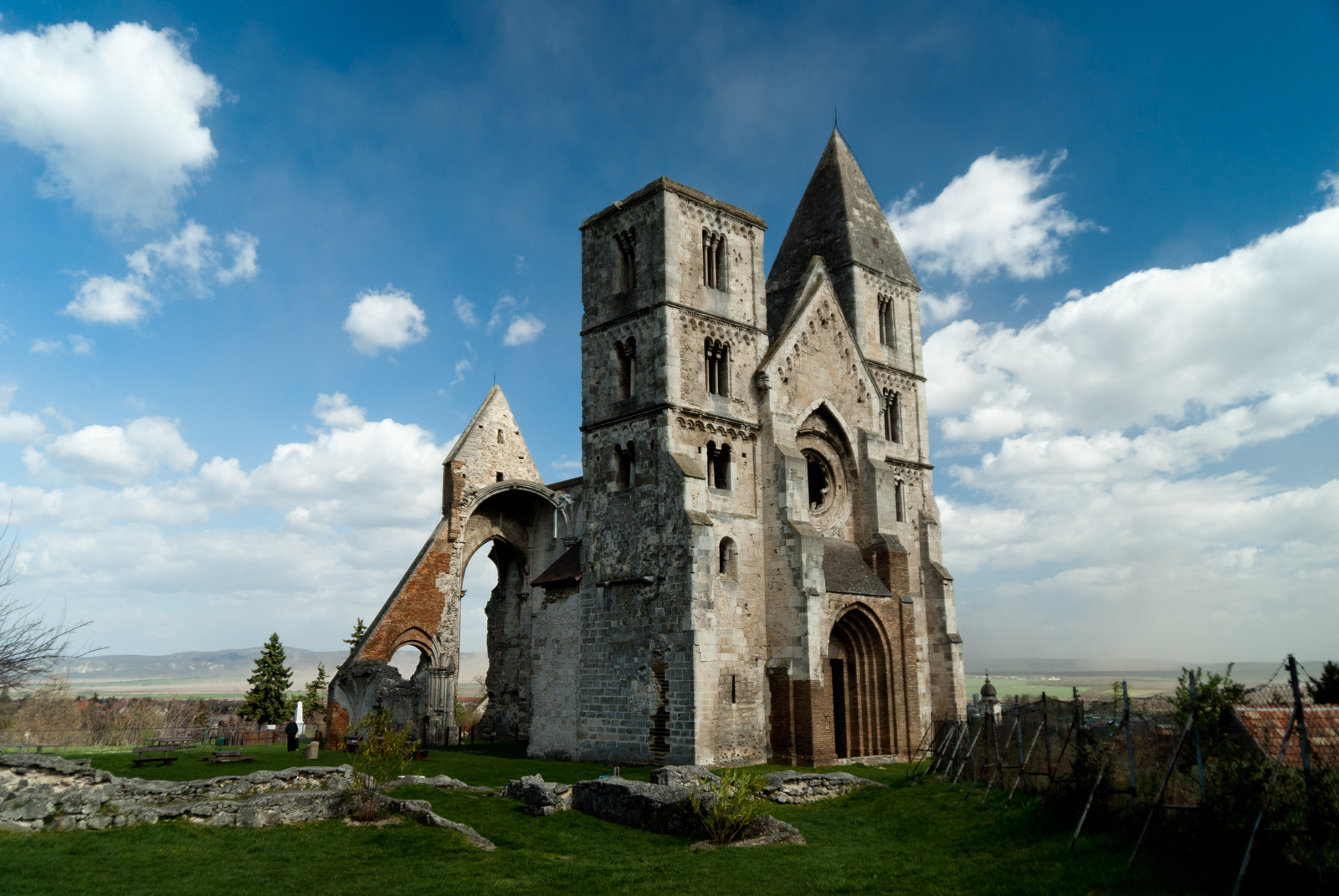
Zsámbék Premontre monastery church

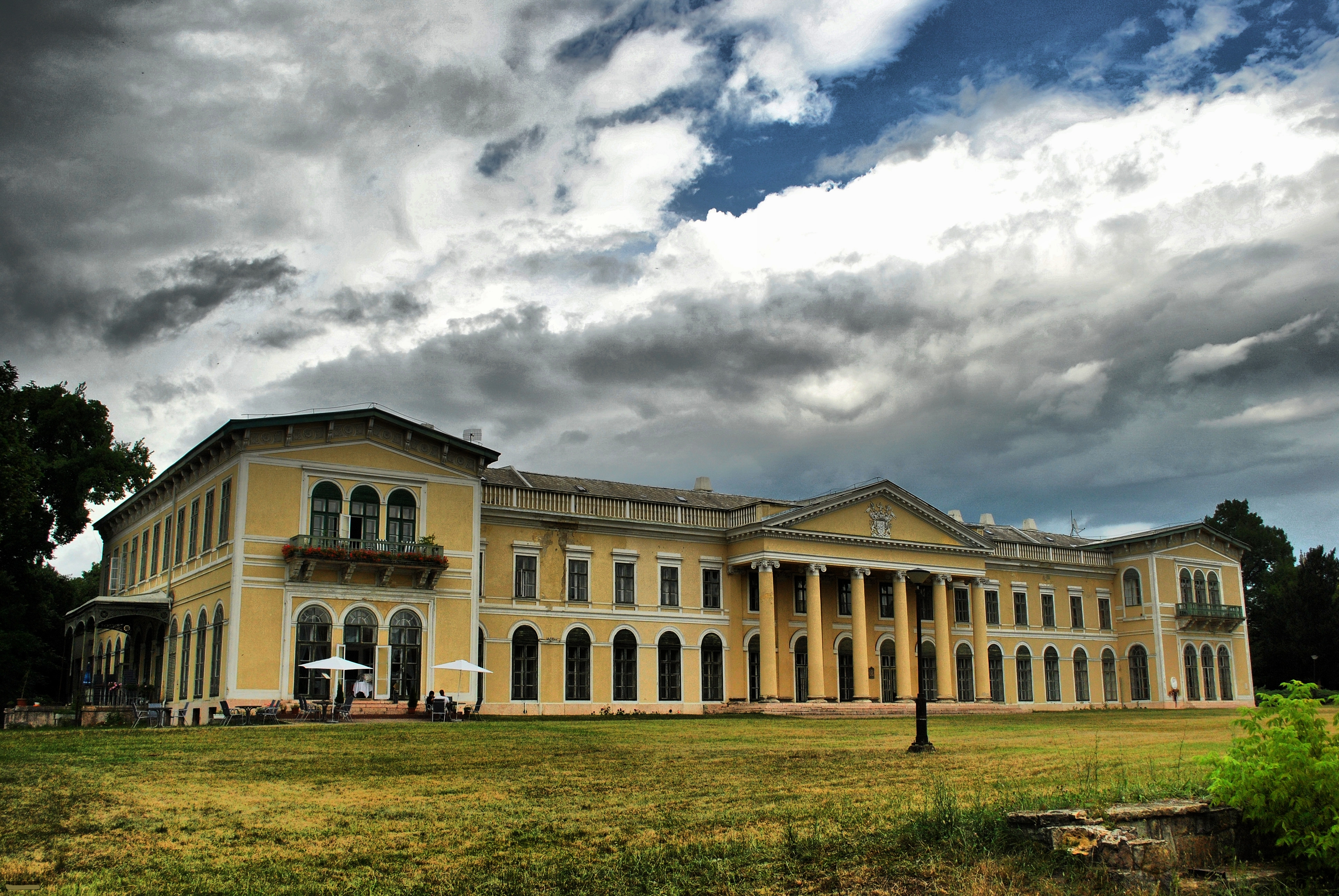
Károlyi Mansion, Fót

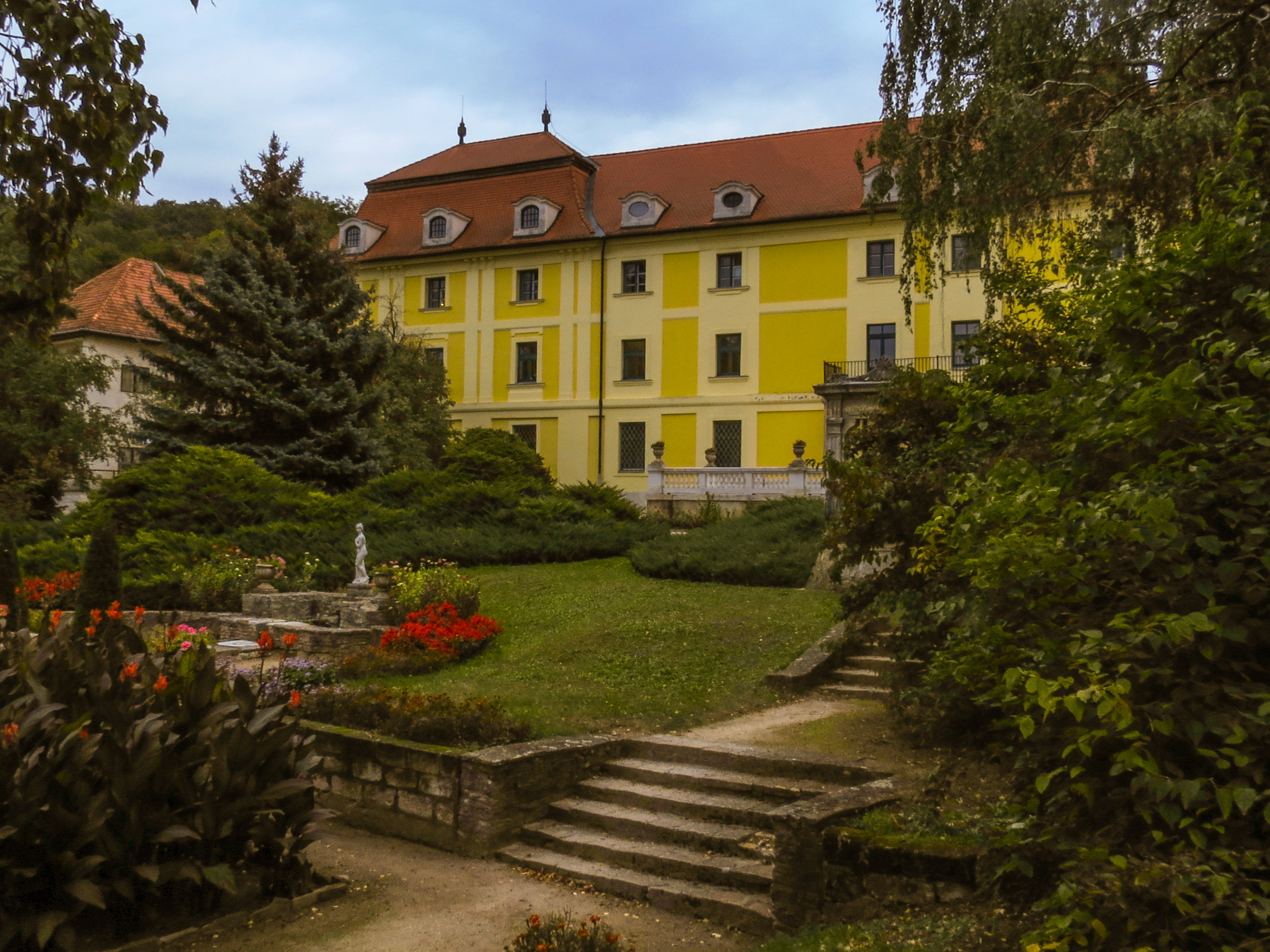
Mailáth Mansion in Törökbálint

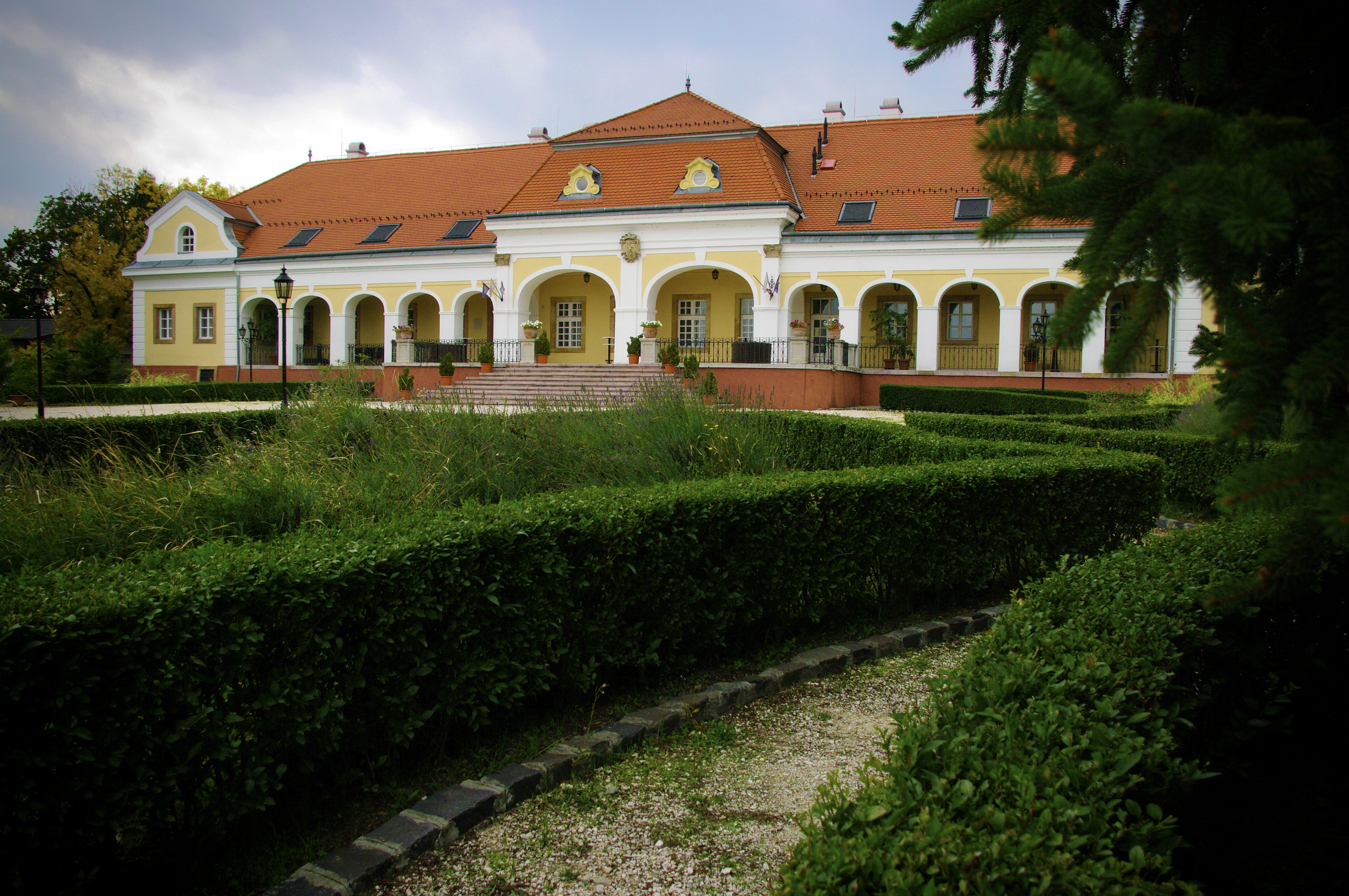
Choral Castle, Pomáz

== International relations ==
Pest County has a partnership relationship with:

- Chongqing Municipality, China
- Harghita County, Romania
- Hebei Province, China
- Ludwigsburg, Baden-Württemberg, Germany
- Masovian Voivodeship, Poland
- Ningxia Hui Autonomous Region, China
- Primorje-Gorski Kotar County, Croatia
