= Tápiószőlős =

- Coat of arms

- Location of Tápiószőlős in Hungary
- Coordinates: 47°17′7.80″N 19°51′12.96″E
- Country: Hungary
- Region: Central Hungary
- County: Pest
- Subregion: Ceglédi
- Rank: Village

Area
  - Total: 30.24 km^{2} (11.68 sq mi)

Population
  - Total: 2,928
  - Density: 96.83/km^{2} (250.8/sq mi)
- Time zone: UTC+1 (CET)
  - Summer (DST): UTC+2 (CEST)
- Postal code: 2769
- Area code: +36 53
- KSH code: 4302
- Website: http://www.tapioszolos.hu

Tápiószőlős is a village in Pest county, Hungary.
