= Kőröstetétlen =

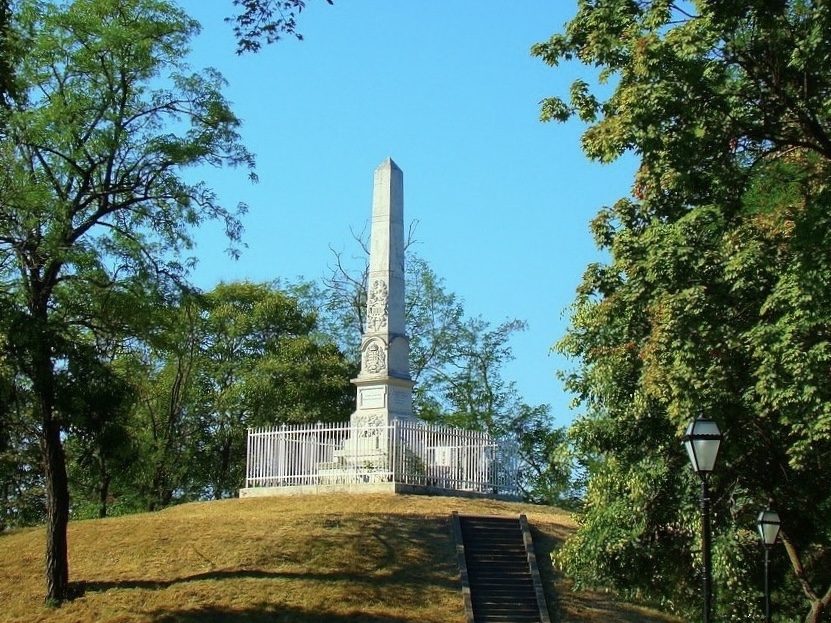

- Flag Coat of arms

- Location of Kőröstetétlen in Hungary
- Coordinates: 47°5′56.04″N 20°1′21.90″E
- Country: Hungary
- Region: Central Hungary
- County: Pest
- Subregion: Ceglédi
- Rank: Village

Area
  - Total: 32.65 km^{2} (12.61 sq mi)
- Time zone: UTC+1 (CET)
  - Summer (DST): UTC+2 (CEST)
- Postal code: 2745
- Area code: +36 53
- Website: www.korostetetlen.hu

Kőröstetétlen is a village in Pest county, Hungary.
