= Újszilvás =

Coordinates: 47°16′42″N 19°55′26″E

- Country: Hungary
- Region: Central Hungary
- County: Pest

Újszilvás is a village in the county of Pest in Hungary.
