= Kocsér =

- Coat of arms

- Location of Kocsér in Hungary
- Coordinates: 47.00193°N 19.92253°E
- Country: Hungary
- Region: Central Hungary
- County: Pest
- Subregion: Ceglédi
- Rank: Village

Area
  - Total: 67.28 km^{2} (25.98 sq mi)

Population (1 January 2008)
  - Total: 1,994
  - Density: 29.64/km^{2} (76.76/sq mi)
- Time zone: UTC+1 (CET)
  - Summer (DST): UTC+2 (CEST)
- Postal code: 2755
- Area code: +36 53
- KSH code: 32771
- Website: www.kocser.hu

Kocsér is a village in Pest county, Hungary.
