= Jászkarajenő =

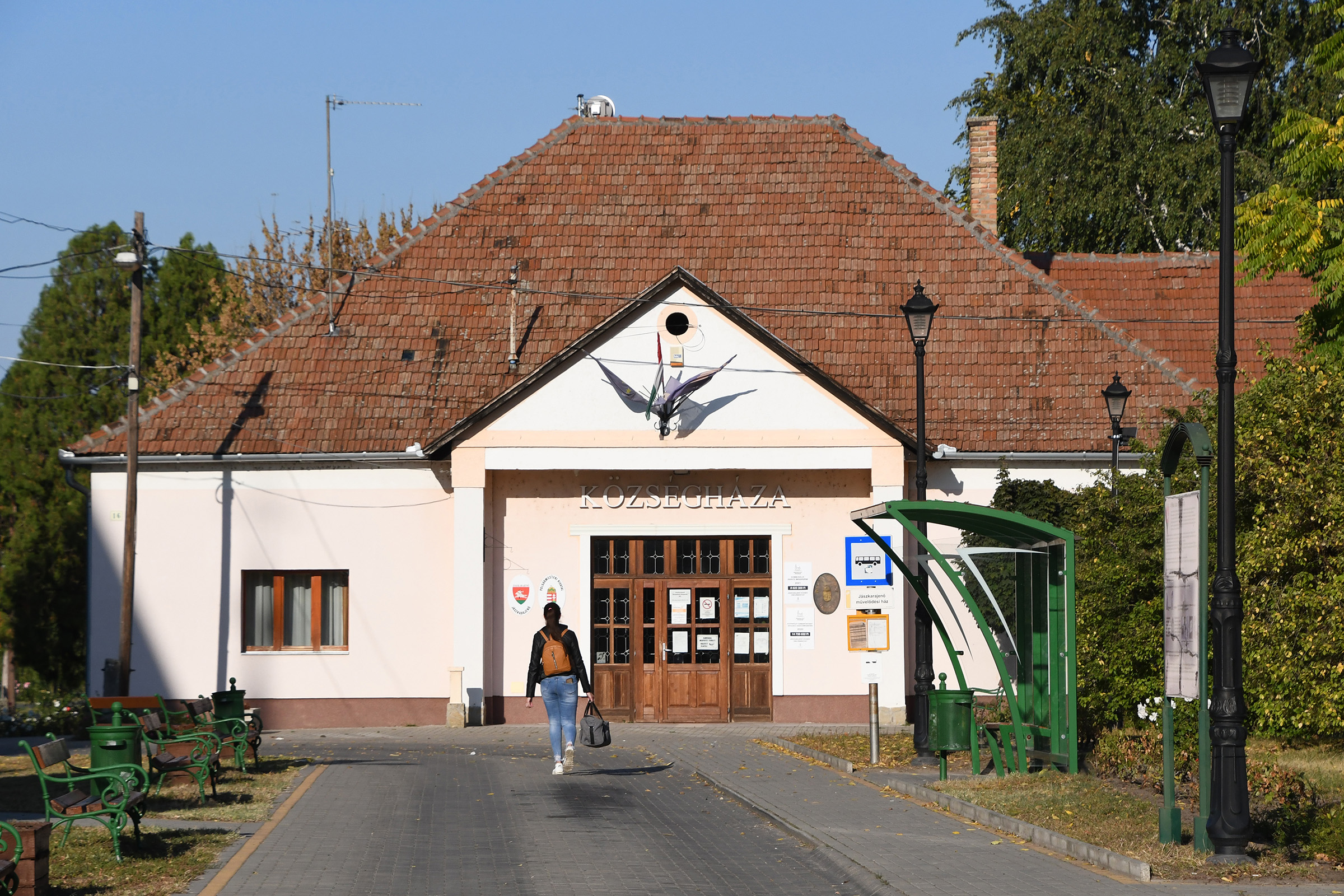
- Village hall

- Coat of arms

- Location of Jászkarajenő in Hungary
- Coordinates: 47°3′2.34″N 20°4′14.20″E
- Country: Hungary
- Region: Central Hungary
- County: Pest
- Subregion: Ceglédi
- Rank: Village

Area
  - Total: 65.15 km^{2} (25.15 sq mi)
- Time zone: UTC+1 (CET)
  - Summer (DST): UTC+2 (CEST)
- Postal code: 2746
- Area code: +36 53
- Website: http://www.jaszkarajeno.hu

Jászkarajenő is a village in Pest county, Hungary.
