= Csemő =

- Coat of arms

- Location of Csemő in Hungary
- Coordinates: 47°6′57.17″N 19°41′46.43″E
- Country: Hungary
- Region: Central Hungary
- County: Pest
- Subregion: Ceglédi
- Rank: Village

Area
  - Total: 79.44 km^{2} (30.67 sq mi)
- Time zone: UTC+1 (CET)
  - Summer (DST): UTC+2 (CEST)
- Postal code: 2713
- Area code: +36 53
- Website: https://csemo.hu/

Csemő is a village in Pest county, Hungary.
