= Törtel =

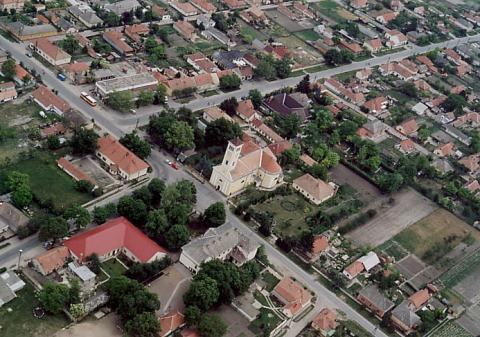

- Coat of arms

- Location of Törtel in Hungary
- Coordinates: 47°7′17.33″N 19°56′23.03″E
- Country: Hungary
- Region: Central Hungary
- County: Pest
- Subregion: Ceglédi
- Rank: Village

Area
  - Total: 84.16 km^{2} (32.49 sq mi)

Population (1 January 2008)
  - Total: 4,436
  - Density: 52.71/km^{2} (136.5/sq mi)
- Time zone: UTC+1 (CET)
  - Summer (DST): UTC+2 (CEST)
- Postal code: 2747
- Area code: +36 53
- KSH code: 22008
- Website: www.tortel.hu

Törtel is a village in Pest county, Hungary.
