= Pest County 11th constituency =

- Constituency for the National Assembly
- Location of Pest county 11 within Pest county

- Location of Pest county within Hungary
- County: Pest County
- Electorate: 75,164 (2026)
- Major settlements: Vác

Current constituency
- Created: 2024
- Party: Tisza Party
- Member: Renáta Szimon
- Elected: 2026

The Pest County 11th parliamentary constituency is one of the 106 constituencies into which the territory of Hungary is divided by Act LXXIX of 2024, and in which voters can elect one member of the National Assembly. The standard abbreviation of the constituency name is: Pest 11. OEVK. The seat is Vác.

== Area ==
The constituency includes the following settlements:

1. Acsa
2. Aszód
3. Csörög
4. Csővár
5. Domony
6. Erdőkertes
7. Galgagyörk
8. Galgamácsa
9. Iklad
10. Kisnémedi
11. Kosd
12. Őrbottyán
13. Penc
14. Püspökhatvan
15. Püspökszilágy
16. Rád
17. Sződliget
18. Sződ
19. Vác
20. Vácduka
21. Vácegres
22. Váchartyán
23. Váckisújfalu
24. Vácrátót

== Members of parliament ==
Name	Party	Term	Election
Károly Pánczél	Fidesz-KDNP	2014 –	Results of the 2014 parliamentary election:
Károly Pánczél	Fidesz-KDNP	2014 –	Results of the 2018 parliamentary election:
Károly Pánczél	Fidesz-KDNP	2014 –	Results of the 2022 parliamentary election:
Renáta Szimon	Tisza Party	2026 – present	Results of the 2026 parliamentary election: 54.13%

== Demographics ==
Historical population
Year	Pop.	±%
2011	101,955	—
2022	113,429	+11.3%

The demographics of the constituency are as follows. The population of the 11th constituency of Pest County was 113,429 on 1 October 2022. The population of the constituency increased by 11,474 between the 2011 and 2022 censuses. Based on the age composition, the majority of the population in the constituency is middle-aged with 41,143 people, while the fewest are elderly with 20,166 people. 85.4% of the population of the constituency has internet access.

According to the highest level of completed education, those with a high school diploma are the most numerous, with 33,035 people, followed by skilled workers with 20,865 people.

According to economic activity, almost half of the population is employed, 57,660 people, the second most significant group is inactive earners, who are mainly pensioners, with 22,779 people.

The most significant ethnic group in the constituency is Germans with 1,998 people and Gypsies with 923 people. The proportion of foreign citizens without Hungarian citizenship is 1%.

In terms of religious composition, the largest religion in the constituency is Roman Catholic (25,300 people), followed by a significant community of Calvinists (11,949 people). The number of people not belonging to a religious community is also significant (11,650 people), the second largest group in the constituency after Roman Catholicism.

== Parliamentary elections ==
2022 Hungarian parliamentary election
Party	Candidate
Normális Élet Pártja	Mihály Dániel
Mi Hazánk	Bobrovácz Antal
Egységben Magyarországért	Jánosi-Lesi Ágota
Munkáspárt-ISZOMM	Fekete László
Fidesz-KDNP	Pánczél Károly
MKKP	Ferancz Norbert
MEMO	Szabó László

== Sources ==
- ↑ Vjt.: "2011. évi CCIII. törvény az országgyűlési képviselők választásáról". Nemzeti Jogszabálytár. Magyar Közlöny Lap- és Könyvkiadó Kft.
- ↑ KSH: "Az országgyűlési egyéni választókerületek adatai". Népszámlálás 2011. Központi Statisztikai Hivatal.
