= Aszód District =

Aszód District Aszódi járás
- District
- Coat of arms

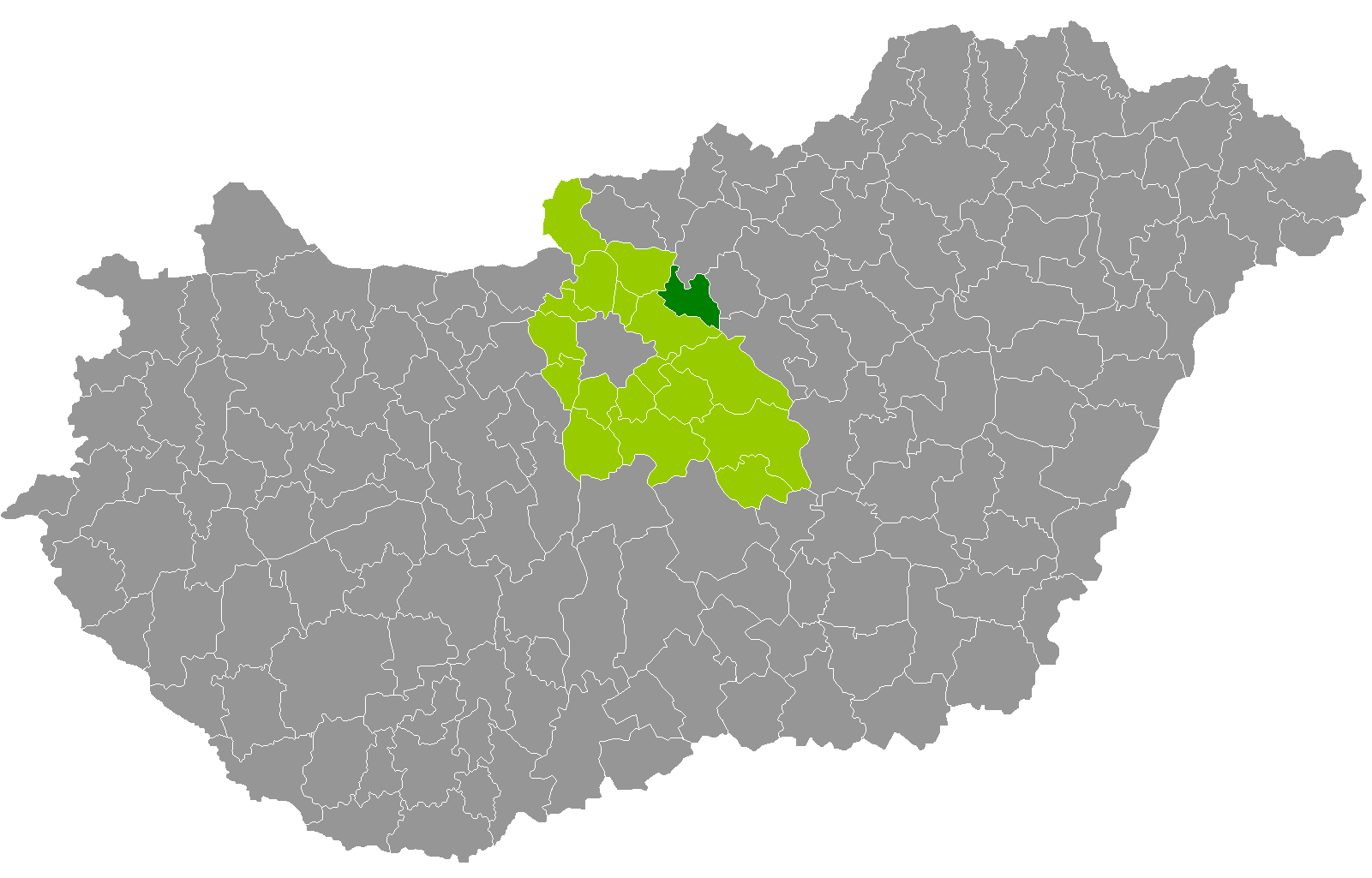
- Aszód District within Hungary and Pest County.
- Country: Hungary
- County: Pest
- District seat: Aszód

Area
  - Total: 298.37 km^{2} (115.20 sq mi)
  - Rank: 11th in Pest

Population (2011 census)
  - Total: 37,472
  - Rank: 15th in Pest
  - Density: 126/km^{2} (330/sq mi)

Aszód (Hungarian: Aszódi járás) is a district in north-eastern part of Pest County. Aszód is also the name of the town where the district seat is found. The district is located in the Central Hungary Statistical Region.

== Geography ==
Aszód District borders with Pásztó District (Nógrád County) to the north, Hatvan District (Heves County) and Jászberény District (Jász-Nagykun-Szolnok County) to the east, Gödöllő District to the southwest, Vác District to the west. The number of the inhabited places in Aszód District is 11.

== Municipalities ==
The district has 2 towns, 2 large villages and 7 villages. (ordered by population, as of 1 January 2013)

- **Aszód** (6,163) – district seat
- Bag (3,710)
- Domony (2,159)
- Galgahévíz (2,489)
- Galgamácsa (1,854)
- Hévízgyörk (2,997)
- Iklad (2,031)
- Kartal (5,617)
- Vácegres (849)
- Verseg (1,402)
- **Tura** (7,721)

The bolded municipalities are cities, italics municipalities are large villages.

== Demographics ==
Religion in Aszód District (2011 census)
1. Catholic Church (54.1%)
2. Greek Catholicism (0.30%)
3. Lutheranism (10.7%)
4. Calvinism (4.30%)
5. Other religions (1.80%)
6. Non-religious (6.70%)
7. Atheists (0.70%)
8. Undeclared (21.4%)

In 2011, it had a population of 37,472 and the population density was 126/km^{2}.

Year	County population	Change
2011	37,472	n/a

=== Ethnicity ===
Besides the Hungarian majority, the main minorities are the Roma (approx. 2,000), German (1,000), Romanian and Slovak (150).

Total population (2011 census): 37,472
Ethnic groups (2011 census): Identified themselves: 36,468 persons:

- Hungarians: 33,075 (90.70%)
- Gypsies: 1,850 (5.07%)
- Germans: 959 (2.63%)
- Others and indefinable: 584 (1.60%)

Approx. 1,000 persons in Aszód District did not declare their ethnic group at the 2011 census.

=== Religion ===
Religious adherence in the county according to 2011 census:

- Catholic – 20,398 (Roman Catholic – 20,268; Greek Catholic – 122);
- Evangelical – 4,020;
- Reformed – 1,596;
- other religions – 686;
- Non-religious – 2,495;
- Atheism – 271;
- Undeclared – 8,006.

== Gallery ==
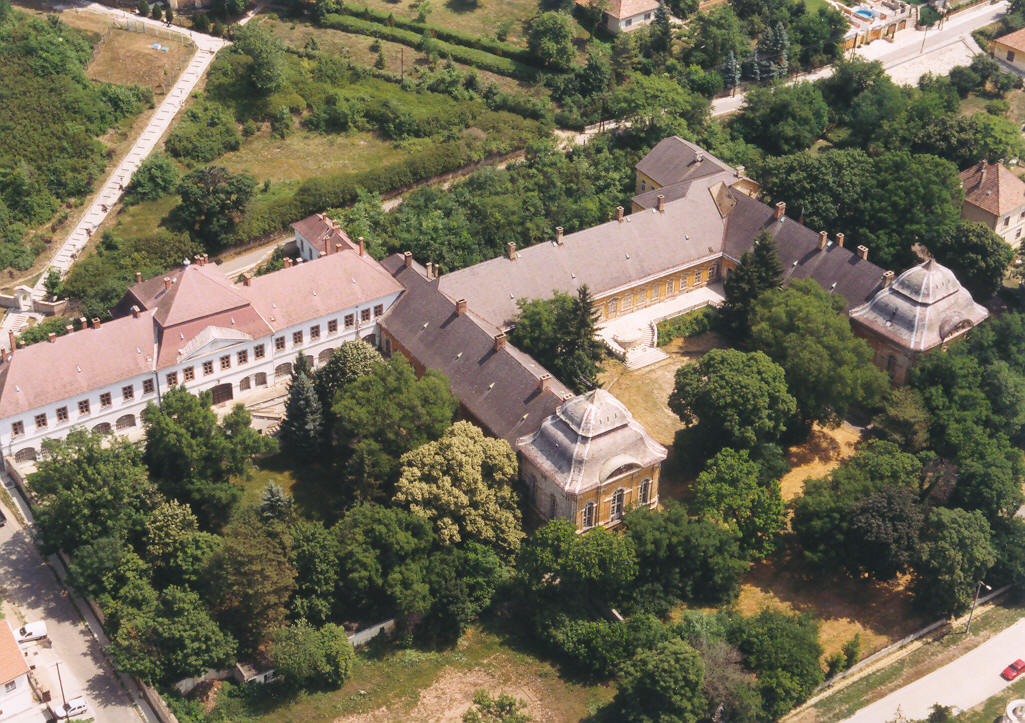
Podmaniczky Mansion in Aszód

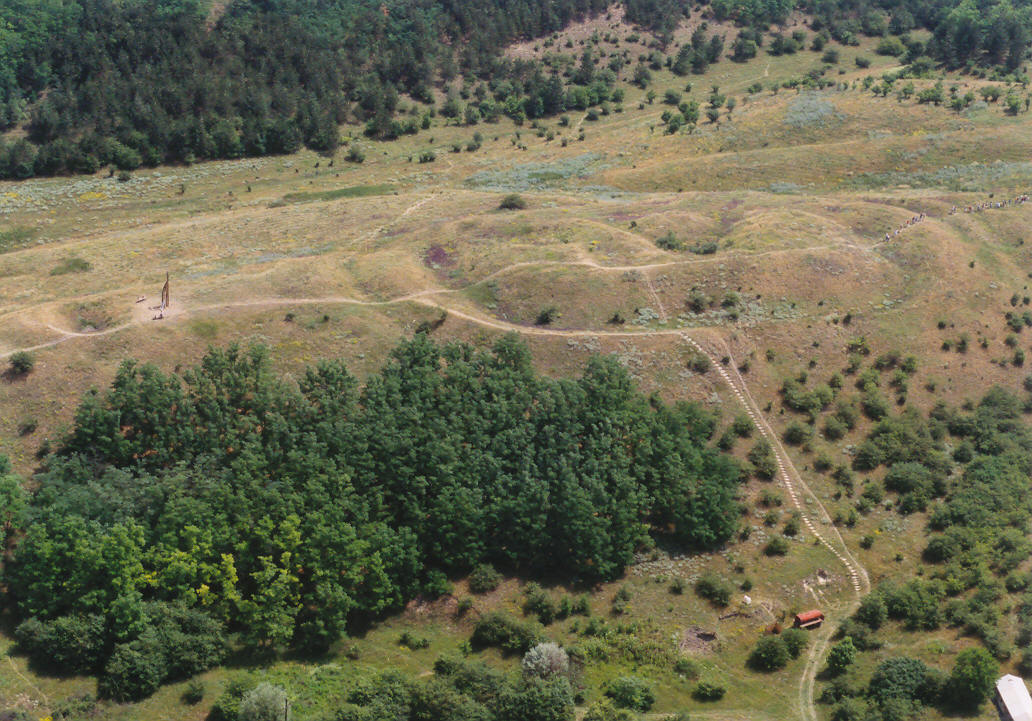
Szentandráspart from above (Galgahévíz)

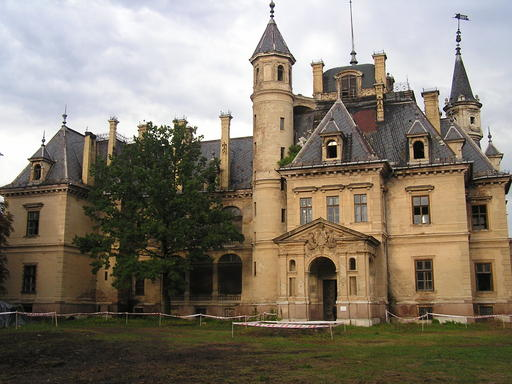
Schossberger Castle in Tura

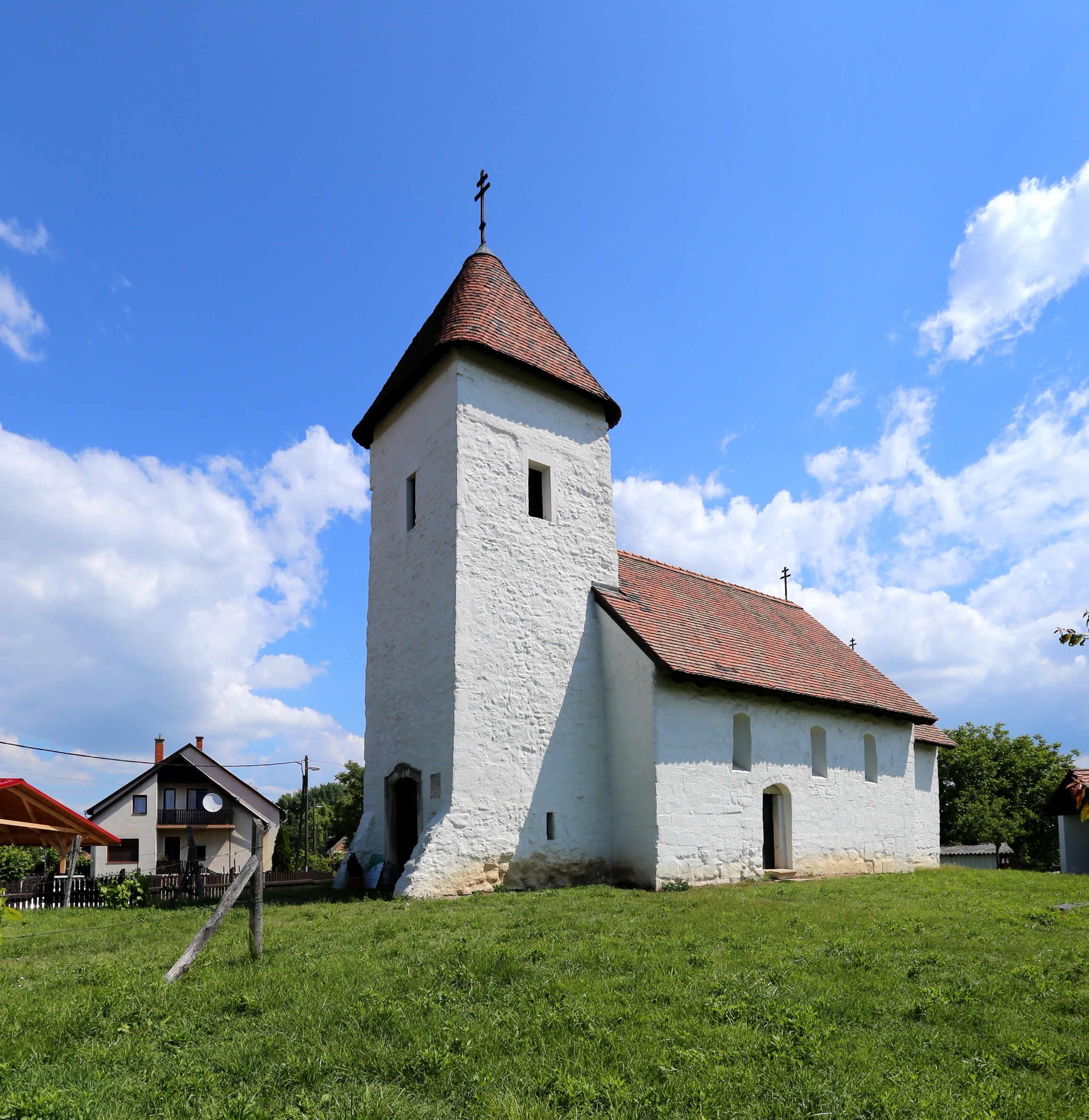
Old Church in Hévízgyörk

== See also ==
- List of cities and towns in Hungary
