= Pest County 7th constituency =

- Constituency for the National Assembly
- Location of Pest county 07 within Pest county

- Location of Pest county within Hungary
- County: Pest County
- Electorate: 76,271 (2026)
- Major settlements: Pécel

Current constituency
- Created: 2024
- Party: Tisza Party
- Member: Ildikó Trompler
- Elected: 2026

The Pest County 7th parliamentary constituency is one of the 106 constituencies into which the territory of Hungary is divided by Act LXXIX of 2024, and in which voters can elect one member of the National Assembly. The standard abbreviation of the constituency name is: Pest 07. OEVK. The seat is Pécel.

== Area ==
The constituency includes the following settlements:

1. Bag
2. Dány
3. Galgahévíz
4. Hévízgyörk
5. Isaszeg
6. Kartal
7. Kóka
8. Maglód
9. Mende
10. Pécel
11. Sülysáp
12. Tura
13. Vácszentlászló
14. Valkó
15. Verseg
16. Zsámbok

== Members of parliament ==
Name	Party	Term	Elections
Dr. Szűcs Lajos	Fidesz-KDNP	2014 –	Results of the 2014 parliamentary election:
Dr. Szűcs Lajos	Fidesz-KDNP	2014 –	Results of the 2018 parliamentary election:
Dr. Szűcs Lajos	Fidesz-KDNP	2014 –	Results of the 2022 parliamentary election:
Ildikó Trompler	Tisza Party	2026 – present	Results of the 2026 parliamentary election: 52.85%

== Demographics ==
Historical population
Year	Pop.	±%
2011	105,168	—
2022	116,060	+10.4%

The demographics of the constituency are as follows. The population of the 7th constituency of Pest County was 116,060 on 1 October 2022. The population of the constituency increased by 10,892 between the 2011 and 2022 censuses. Based on the age composition, the majority of the population in the constituency is middle-aged with 42,554 people, while the fewest are elderly with 19,133 people. 88.7% of the population of the constituency has internet access

According to the highest level of completed education, those with a high school diploma are the most numerous, with 36,287 people, followed by graduates with 20,185 people.

According to economic activity, almost half of the population is employed, 60,736 people, the second most significant group is inactive earners, who are mainly pensioners with 21,122 people.

The most significant ethnic group in the constituency is Germans with 1,098 people and Gypsies with 677 people. The proportion of foreign citizens without Hungarian citizenship is 0.8%.

According to religious composition, the largest religion of the residents of the constituency is Roman Catholic (21,737 people), and a significant community is the Calvinist (9,672 people). The number of those not belonging to a religious community is also significant (14,912 people), the second largest group in the constituency after the Roman Catholic religion.

== Parliamentary elections ==
=== 2022 ===
2022 Hungarian parliamentary election
Party	Candidate	Votes	%	± %
Fidesz-KDNP	Szűcs Lajos		49.22	▲4.4
Egységben Magyarországért	Péter Fricsovszky-Tóth		36.50	▼15.27
Mi Hazánk	Szabóné Papp Klára		6.57	-
MKKP	Iván Petra		4.54	-
MEMO	Balogh István		2.31	-
Normális Párt	Bocz Dániel		0.87	-
Published			71.76	▲0.84
A Fidesz-KDNP tartja a körzetet.

=== 2018 ===
2018 Hungarian parliamentary election
Party	Candidate	Votes	%	± %
Fidesz-KDNP	Dr. Szűcs Lajos		44.82	▲1.86
Jobbik	Sas Zoltán		29.54	▲9.92
DK	Nyeste Andrea		14.26	▼14.83
LMP	Apostol Klaudia		5.77	▲1.31
Momentum	Kalasovszky Bernadett		2.2	-
Együtt	Tóth Judit		1.15	▼27.94
Munkáspárt	Kovács István		0.34	-
Other parties			1.93	▼2.73
Published			70.92	▲9.36
Number of voters			100	▼3.81
A Fidesz-KDNP tartja a körzetet.

=== 2014 ===
2014 Hungarian parliamentary election
Party	Candidate	Votes	%	± %
Fidesz-KDNP	Dr. Szűcs Lajos		42.96	
Összefogás	Szabó Rebeka Katalin		29.09	
Jobbik	Sas Zoltán		19.62	
LMP	Pintér Sándor		4.46	
Szociáldemokraták	Tóth László		0.23	
Other parties			4.66	
Published			61,56	
Number of voters			100	
A Fidesz-KDNP nyeri meg a körzetet.

== Opposition primary election – 2021 ==
2021 Hungarian opposition primary
Faction	Nominating organizations	Candidate	Votes	%
Jobbik	Jobbik, DK, LMP, ÚK, MMM	Fricsovszky-Tóth Péter		63.5
Momentum	Momentum, MSZP, Párbeszéd	Farag Alexandra		36.5
Total votes				100
Péter Fricsovszky-Tóth wins the district.

== Sources ==
- ↑ Vjt.: "2011. évi CCIII. törvény az országgyűlési képviselők választásáról". Nemzeti Jogszabálytár. Magyar Közlöny Lap- és Könyvkiadó Kft.
- ↑ KSH: "Az országgyűlési egyéni választókerületek adatai". Népszámlálás 2011. Központi Statisztikai Hivatal.
