= Pálné Veres =

Hungarian teacher and feminist

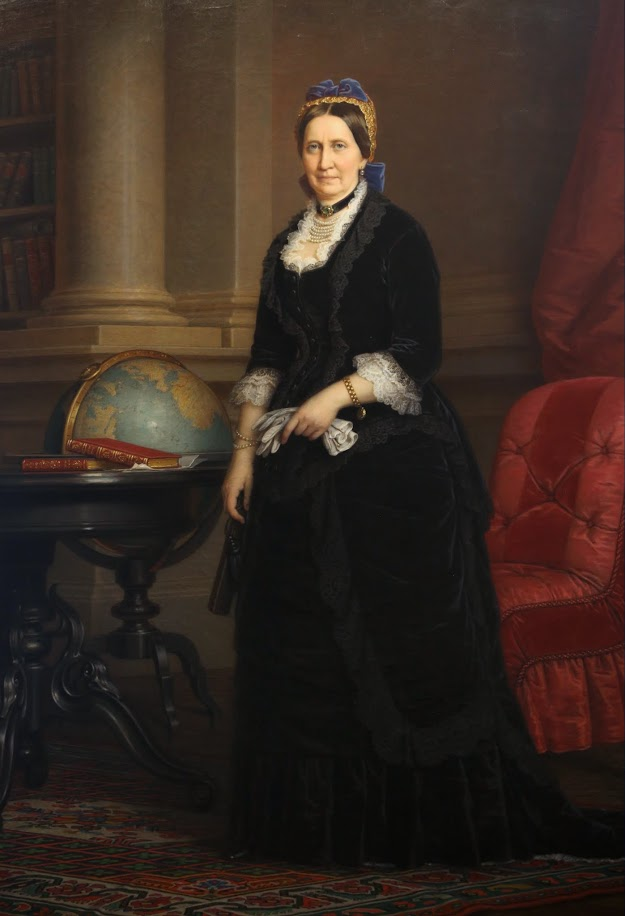
- Oil painting of Veres by Miklós Barabás, 1855
- Born: Hermína Karolína Benická; 13 December 1815; Trebeľovce-Láza, Novohradská County, Kingdom of Hungary
- Died: 28 September 1895 (aged 79); Váchartyán, Austria-Hungary
- Other names: Hermin Beniczky, Hermin Veres von Farád, Hermína Benická, Hermína Benická-Verešová, Hermína Verešová, Hermína Verešová-Beniczká, Pálné Veres
- Occupations: Education activist, teacher
- Known for: Opening the first secondary school for women in Hungary
- Children: 2
- Relatives: Márton Sturmann (grandfather)

Hermína Karolína Benická Verešová commonly known as Pálné Veres (née: Hermina Benická or Beniczky, 1815–1895) was a teacher and feminist from the Slovak Region of the Kingdom of Hungary. Her family were German-speaking Lutherans. Her father was an official in Nógrád County, but after his death in 1816, the family moved to Buda. She was educated until the age of sixteen by her mother, a teacher who died in the cholera epidemic of 1831. Taken in by her grandfather, she embarked on a period of self-study from his library. After moving to Pest with the help of an aunt, Benická worked to improve her Hungarian and continued her studies. Upon her marriage, she adopted the name Pálné Veres.

From the 1840s Veres became an advocate for women and girls' education. She gave speeches and wrote articles about the importance of training to create mothers who could educate their children and students who would become productive citizens. She organized a conference in 1867, which resulted in establishing the Hungarian National Association for Women's Education and became its president. In 1868, the Diet of Hungary passed legislation making primary schooling for children compulsory, but refused to sanction secondary education for girls. After organizing a petition drive to press the legislature on the issue failed, the association opened the first secondary school for women in Hungary, for which Veres became director. She received the Golden Cross of Merit with the Crown for her efforts on women's education. In a street in Budapest bearing her name, a statue was erected to honor her in 1906.

== Early life and education ==
Hermína Karolína Benická was born on 13 December 1815 on her father's estate in Trebeľovce-Láza, (Note: Alternately recorded as Lázipuszta, Hungary (Trebel'ovce, Slovakia)) (near what is now Lučenec, Slovakia), in Novohradská County, in the Slovak Region of the Kingdom of Hungary. Her father Pavol Benický (also Pál Beniczky) (Note: The surname has many forms, such as Benyiczký; Benický; Beniczky de Benicze et Micsinye; Beniczky de Benicze, Micsinye et Pribóc; Benická z Beníc a Mičinej; Benická z Beníc, Mičinej a Prí; and Beniczky.) was a Protestant landowner from a noble family, who served as the deputy prefect of Novohradská County. The family were German-speaking Lutherans, and Pavol was born in Banská Bystrica (known at the time as Neusohl). Her mother Karolina Sturmann, daughter of the wealthy iron industrialist, Márton Sturmann and his wife Anna Mária (née Sembery v. Felsőszud), was a teacher. Benická barely knew her father's family as he died when she was one year old and her mother relocated with her sister and daughters, Maria, Hermína, and Lotti to Buda. They lived in a house purchased by their grandfather Sturmann, where Karolina educated her daughters until her death in a cholera epidemic in 1831.

When their mother died, the three sisters moved to their grandfather Sturmann's estate in Turčok, where Benická continued her studies in her grandfather's large library. (Note: Hungarian and German sources say the girls lived in Tótgyörk (now known as Galgagyörk), while Slovak sources state they lived in Turčok near Revúca and only moved to Pest with the help of an aunt.) The girls were very isolated on the estate. With the assistance of a paternal aunt, Terézia Benická, Hermína eventually moved to Pest hoping to continue her education. She discovered that she did not have sufficient proficiency in Hungarian and began taking lessons in the language. She also created self-study courses in art, geography, history, literature, and science, but because of an eye infection, had difficulty with reading. During her time in Pest, Benická met and became friends with many prominent people including the writer Imre Madách, politician Pál Szontágh, literary critic Ferenc Toldy, and playwright Lőrinc Tóth. She also met Pal Veres (also called Pavle Vereš), the head notary and deputy prefect of Nógrád County. In 1839, Benická and Veres married at his family's castle in Vanyarc. At the time of her marriage, Benická took her husband's name, and according to Hungarian custom, thereafter affixed the suffix "né" (meaning wife of), to her husband's name, becoming Palné Veres. Shortly afterward, the couple moved to Vanyarc, where they had a daughter Szilárda in 1842, and a son, who died soon after birth in 1844.

== Activism ==
As early as 1840, Veres developed an interest in promoting women's education. Having studied the works of Swiss philosopher Jean-Jacques Rousseau and Swiss education reformer Johann Heinrich Pestalozzi, she began advocating for better educational training for girls. She employed university-trained instructors for her daughter's education and participated in the lessons. She became convinced that education would elevate self-confidence, which in turn would make women more valuable members of society. After her daughter married and left home in 1861, Veres became publicly active in her efforts to improve education. She began giving speeches and in 1865 published "Felhívás a nőköz" ("Call to Women") in the national newspaper A Hon (The Homeland), arguing that the education of women was critical for bringing up children to be good citizens. She called for women to gather together to discuss the issue and began working with prominent women's organizations and individuals to organize a conference, which was held in Pest in May 1867. That year, she founded the Országos Nőképző Egyesület (Hungarian National Association for Women's Education) to help pay the costs of women and girls' education. The group was officially sanctioned by the Hungarian Ministry of the Interior in 1868, with Veres as president and Countess Josefin Teleki as vice president. Among the founding members was the writer and journalist Emilia Kánya.

In 1867, Austria-Hungary was created granting each part of the dual monarchy the power to control their internal affairs. The Diet of Hungary passed legislation in 1868, making primary schooling for girls and boys compulsory, but made no provisions for girls to attain secondary education. Veres led a campaign to collect signatures to petition the legislature calling for higher education for women. She began traveling and speaking with women's groups about the need for the state to provide coeducational opportunities, even presenting a speech at a conference in Germany sponsored by the Allgemeiner Deutscher Frauenverein (General German Women's Association) in 1869. Although over 9,000 signatures were collected, the government rejected the idea of girls' secondary education. In October 1869, the Országos Nőképző Egyesület opened a two-year private school for girls over age thirteen, with Veres as director. It was the first school offering secondary education for girls in Hungary. Its curriculum aimed to teach girls to be self-sufficient and to embody Christian ideals in their behavior. When the school opened, it had fourteen pupils and was located in two rooms in an apartment in Pest. It offered four elementary level classes, four intermediary courses, and three superior classes which included religious instruction; French, German, and Hungarian languages; Hungarian literature; aesthetics; pedagogy; anthropology and psychology; logic; history of civilization (above all, as it related to women); mathematics, algebra and geometry; art and drawing; vocal and instrumental music; and gymnastics.

Veres almost resigned from the Országos Nőképző Egyesület in the 1870s, when parents demanded that teachers at the school be Catholic. She was convinced not to leave only because it would not have benefited the school. She was also disappointed in the high rate of departures of the students before the superior level. The upper bourgeoisie and aristocratic families whose daughters were her students did not see any practical reason for their daughters to attend beyond a certain age. The superior-level classes were viewed as only useful for young women who intended to become school teachers themselves. She did succeed in influencing the upper bourgeoisie and aristocracy towards acknowledging the benefits of education in general for children of both sexes and in 1879, she received the Golden Cross of Merit with the Crown. This was one of the first times a non-noble woman had been so honored. In addition, the school itself received the Golden Cross of Merit from Emperor Franz Joseph. (Note: Other sources indicate the date of the award corresponded with the 1893 silver jubilee of the school.)

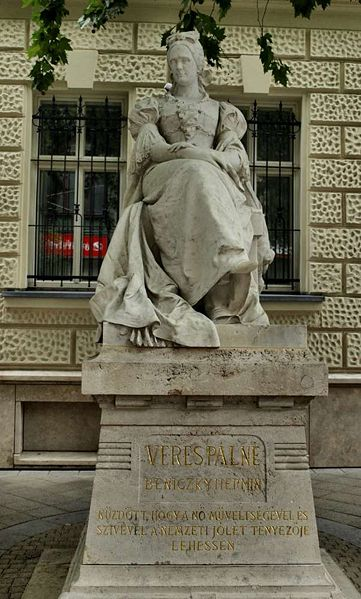
Statue of Veres in Budapest District V, northern end of Veres Pálné Street

Mainly through the fundraising activities of Veres, in 1881 the school relocated to larger quarters, which allowed them to offer boarding, at a location on Zöldfa Street in Budapest. Veres retired in 1889 but remained active as an advocate for women's education. By 1893, the school had over 800 pupils, and in addition to boarding facilities, provided normal school training. With the help of her daughter, in the mid-1890s she organized the curriculum for home economics courses for the students. She also compiled her experiences and those of other teachers in a book, Tapasztalati lélektan felnőttek számára (Practical Psychology for Adults), which was published in 1895.

== Death and legacy ==
Veres died on 28 September 1895 in Váchartyán, Austria-Hungary and was buried in the cemetery at Vanyarc. Shortly after she died, the Diet of Hungary passed legislation to admit women to university. In 1896, the girls' school she founded became a gymnasium, a type of preparatory school. In 1906, a statue to honor her commitment to women's education was erected in Budapest. Later, the street on which the school was located was renamed Veres Pálné utca (Pálné Veres Street) in her honor.
