= Vác District =

Coordinates: 47.7833°N 19.1333°E

Vác District Váci járás
- Districts of Hungary
- Coat of arms

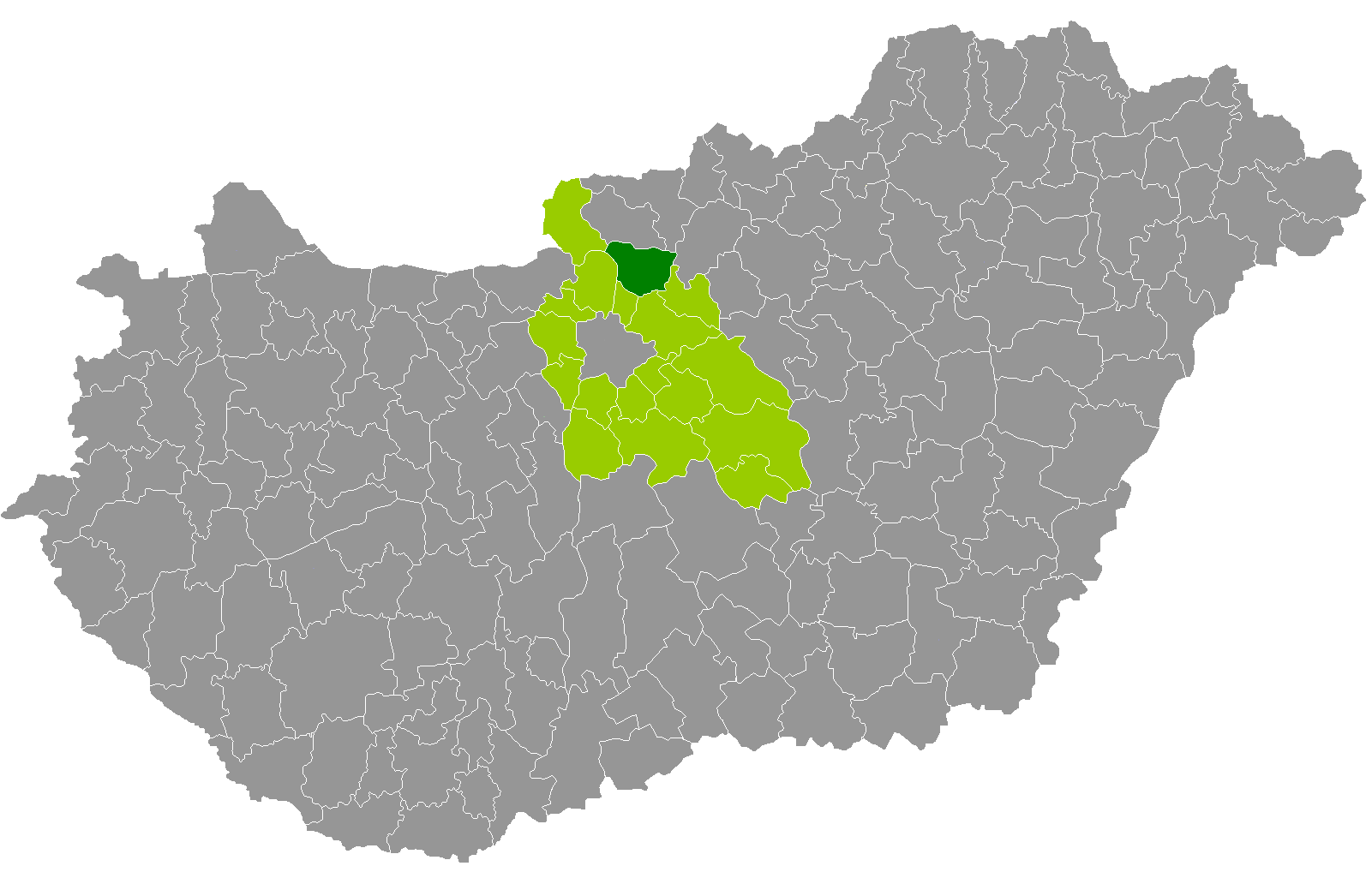
- Vác District within Hungary and Pest County.
- Country: Hungary
- County: Pest
- District seat: Vác

Area
  - Total: 362.19 km^{2} (139.84 sq mi)
  - Rank: 7th in Pest

Population (2011 census)
  - Total: 68,234
  - Rank: 9th in Pest
  - Density: 188/km^{2} (490/sq mi)

Vác (Hungarian: Váci járás) is a district in northern part of Pest County. Vác is also the name of the town where the district seat is found. The district is located in the Central Hungary Statistical Region.

== Geography ==
Vác District borders with Rétság District and Balassagyarmat District (Nógrád County) to the north, Pásztó District (Nógrád County) and Aszód District to the east, Gödöllő District and Dunakeszi District to the south, Szentendre District and Szob District to the west. The number of the inhabited places in Vác District is 18.

== Municipalities ==
The district has 2 towns and 16 village. (ordered by population, as of 1 January 2013)

- Acsa (1,407)
- Csörög (1,891)
- Csővár (633)
- Galgagyörk (1,087)
- Kisnémedi (640)
- Kosd (2,483)
- **Őrbottyán** (7,091)
- Penc (1,502)
- Püspökhatvan (1,453)
- Püspökszilágy (756)
- Rád (1,944)
- Sződ (3,586)
- Sződliget (4,423)
- **Vác** (33,475) – district seat
- Vácduka (1,360)
- Váchartyán (1,772)
- Váckisújfalu (409)
- Vácrátót (1,869)

The bolded municipalities are cities.

== Demographics ==
Religion in Vác District (2011 census)
1. Catholic Church (41.6%)
2. Greek Catholicism (0.40%)
3. Calvinism (7.80%)
4. Lutheranism (5.00%)
5. Other religions (2.70%)
6. Non-religious (12.5%)
7. Atheists (1.40%)
8. Undeclared (28.6%)

In 2011, it had a population of 68,234 and the population density was 188/km².

Year	County population	Change
2011	68,234	n/a

=== Ethnicity ===
Besides the Hungarian majority, the main minorities are the Roma (approx. 1,100), Slovak (1,000), German (650) and Romanian (200).

Total population (2011 census): 68,234
Ethnic groups (2011 census): Identified themselves: 62,694 persons:

- Hungarians: 58,696 (93.62%)
- Gypsies: 1,135 (1.81%)
- Slovaks: 989 (1.58%)
- Germans: 659 (1.05%)
- Others and indefinable: 1,215 (1.94%)

Approx. 5,500 persons in Vác District did not declare their ethnic group at the 2011 census.

=== Religion ===
Religious adherence in the county according to 2011 census:

- Catholic – 28,657 (Roman Catholic – 28,378; Greek Catholic – 274);
- Reformed – 5,286;
- Evangelical – 3,426;
- other religions – 1,834;
- Non-religious – 8,525;
- Atheism – 964;
- Undeclared – 19,542.

== Gallery ==
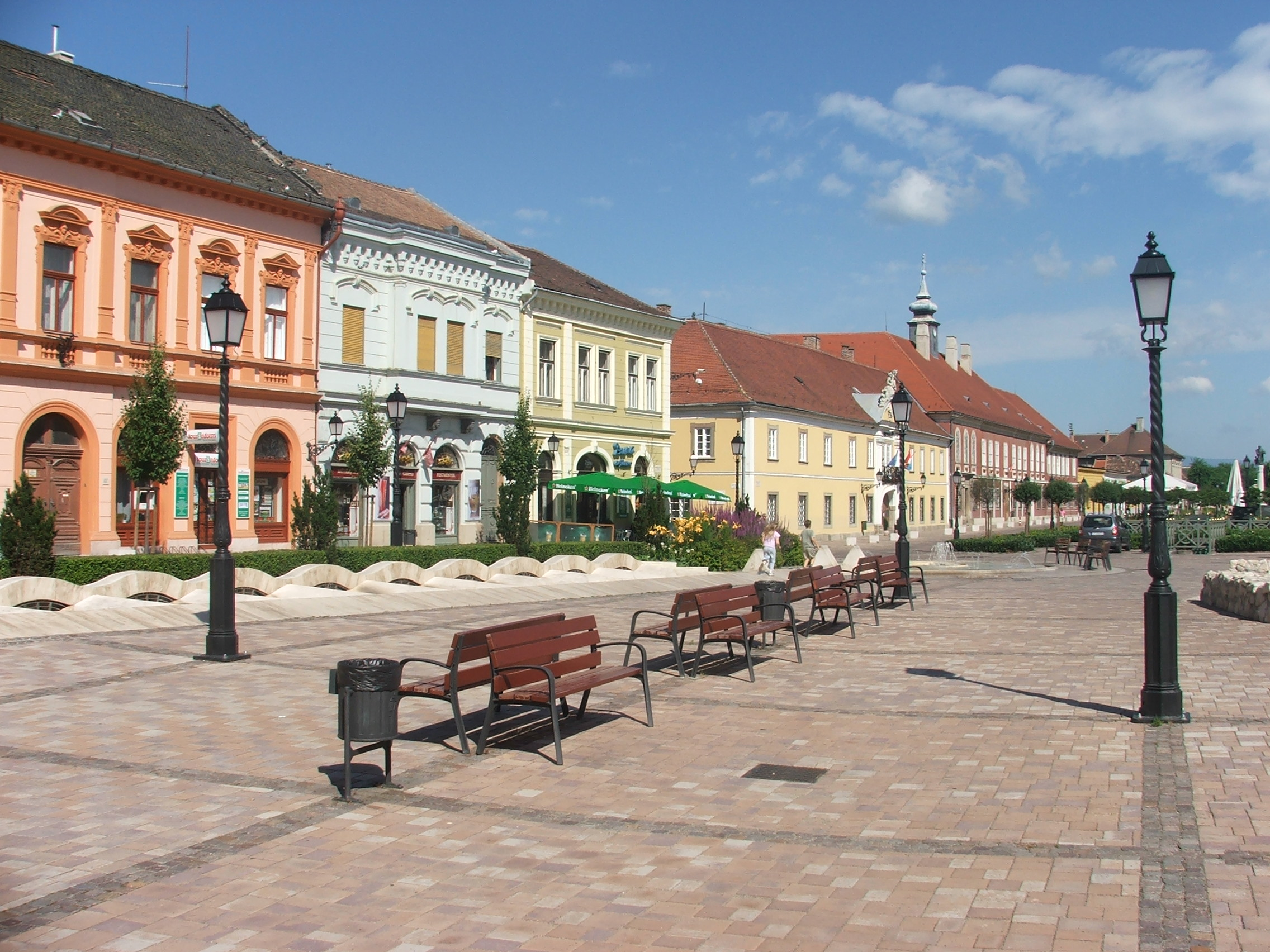
Downtown of Vác

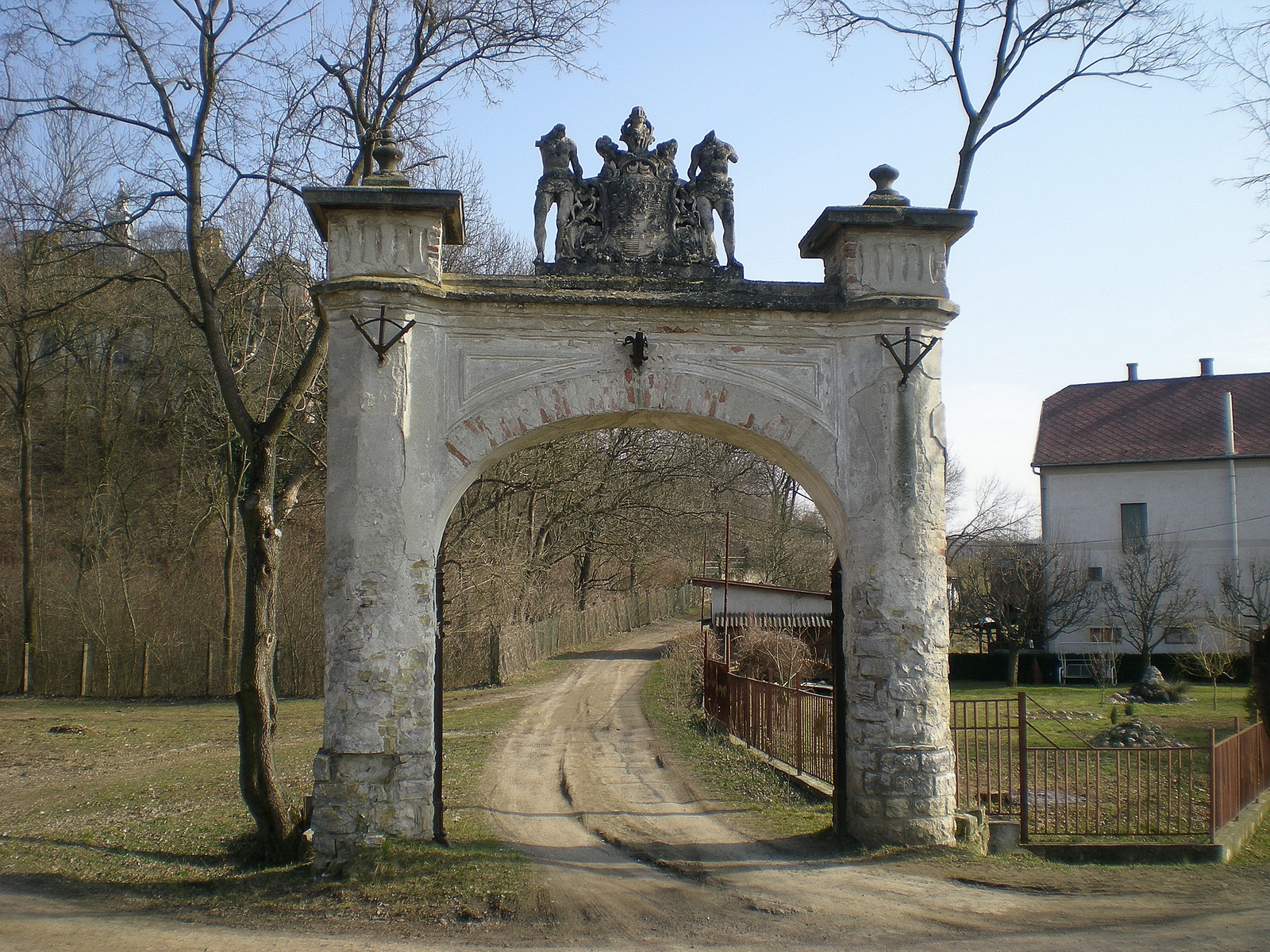
Prónay Mansion in Acsa

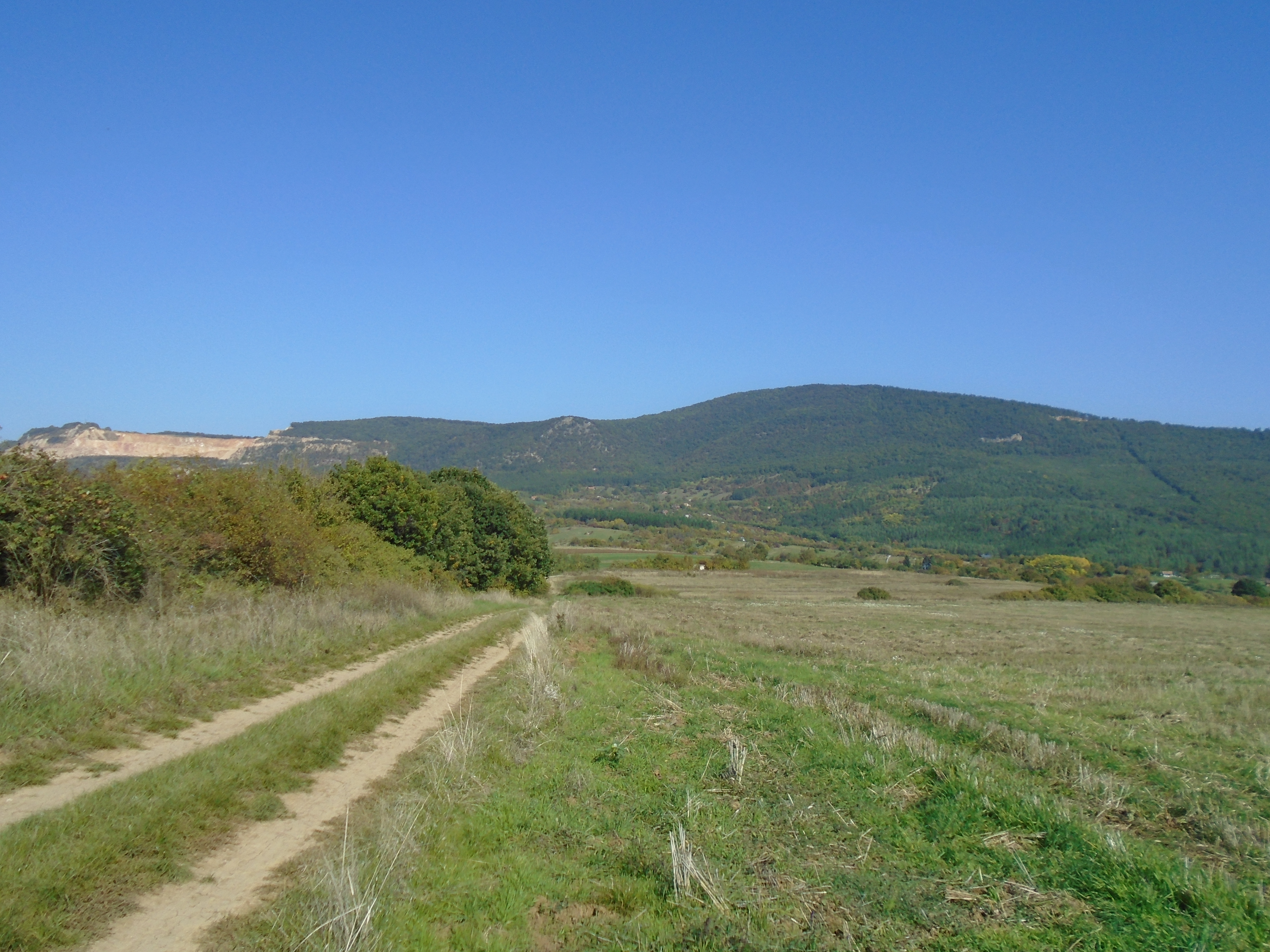
View of Naszály

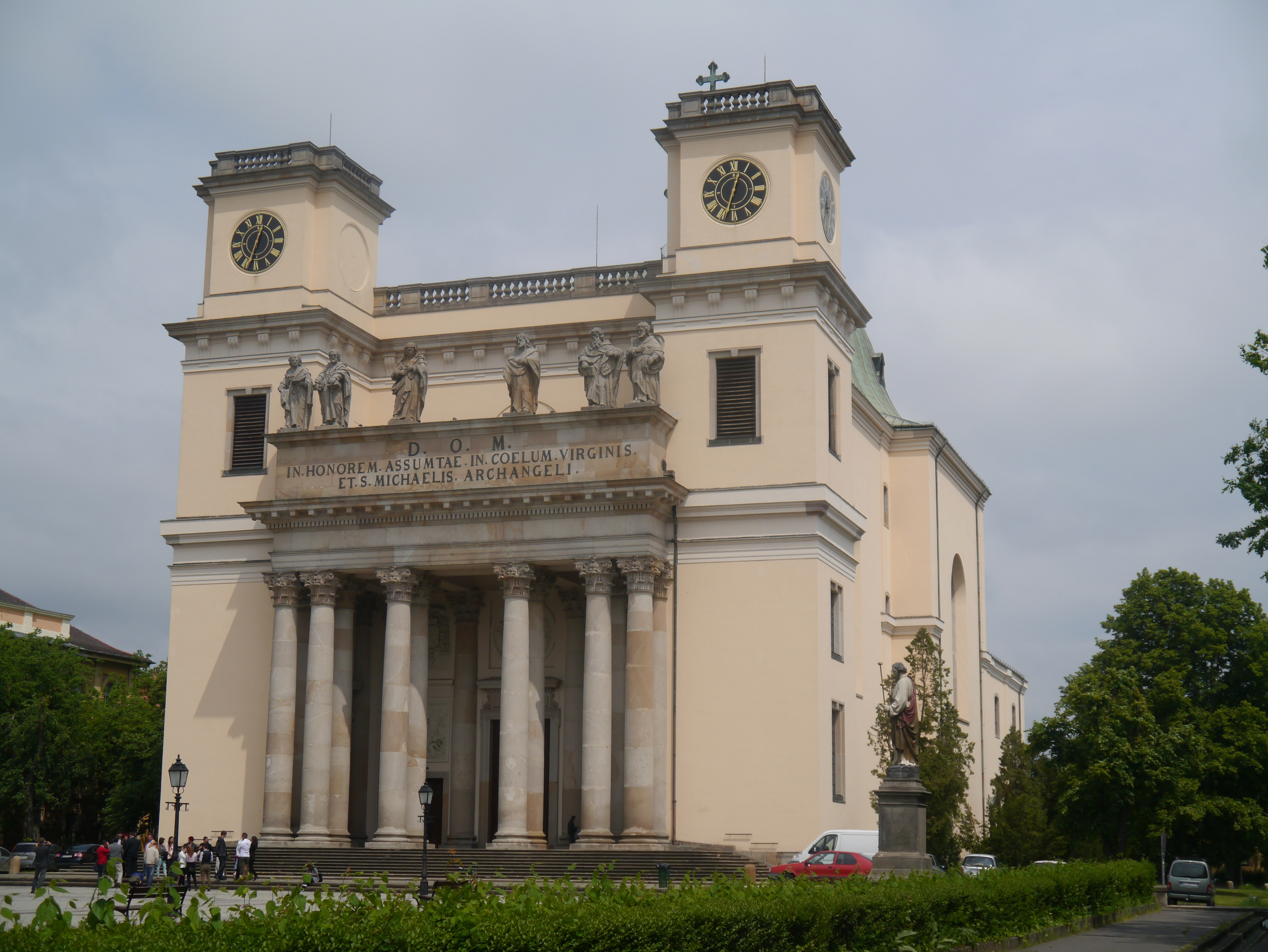
Assumption Cathedral in Vác

== See also ==
- List of cities and towns in Hungary
