= Zsámbok =

- Village
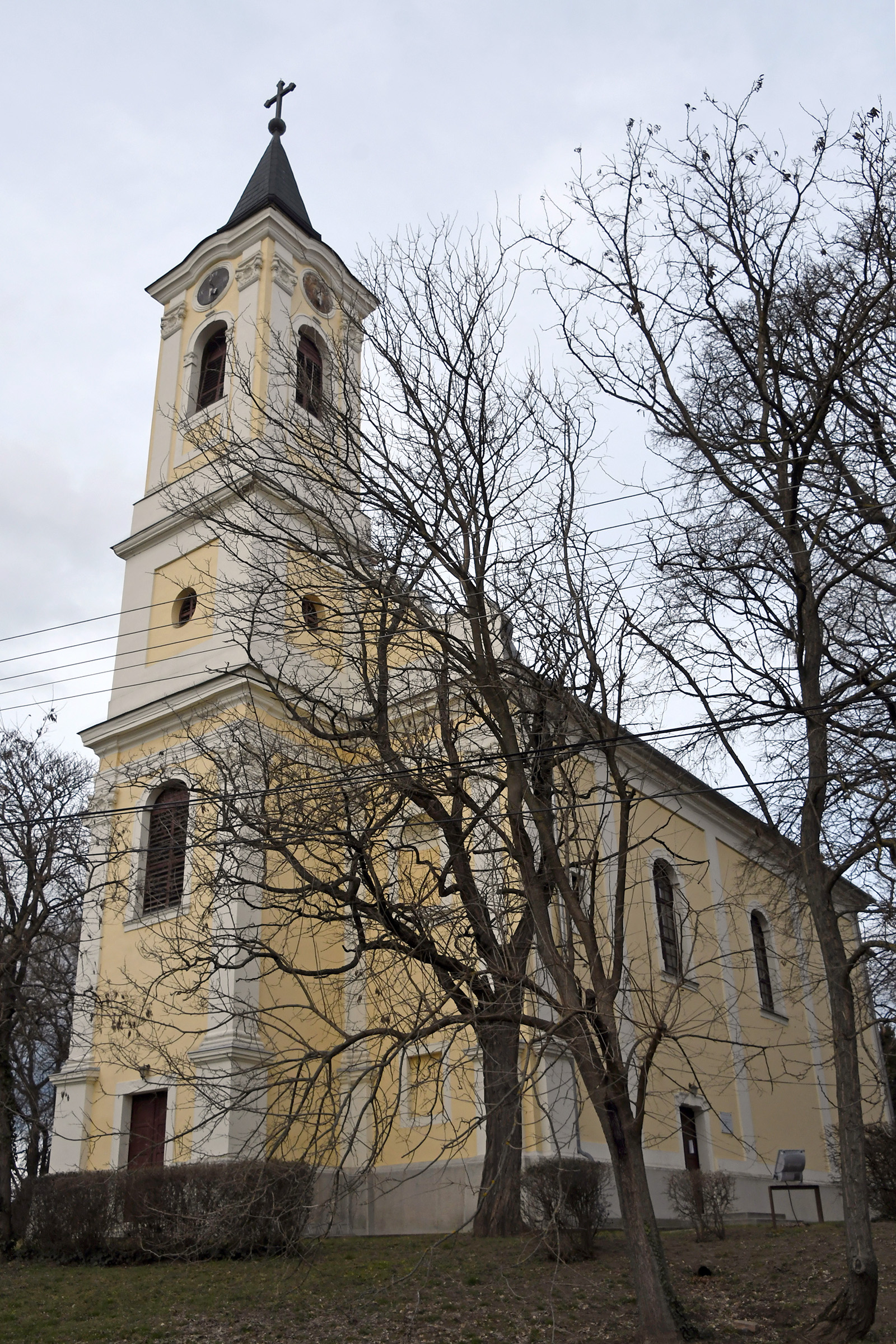

- Seal

- Location within Hungary
- Coordinates: 47°32′34″N 19°36′26″E
- Country: Hungary
- Region: Central Hungary
- County: Pest
- Subregion: Gödöllői

Government
  - Mayor: Ilona Holló

Area
  - Total: 23.35 km^{2} (9.02 sq mi)

Population (2010)
  - Total: 2,407 ▼
  - Density: 103.1/km^{2} (267.0/sq mi)
- Time zone: UTC+1 (CET)
  - Summer (DST): UTC+2 (CEST)
- Postal code: 2116
- Area code: 28
- Website: zsambok.hu

Zsámbok is a village and commune in the comitatus of Pest County, Hungary.

== Location ==
Zsámbok is located in central Hungary, in the eastern part of Pest County, near the border of Heves County and Jász-Nagykun-Szolnok County.

== Transportation ==
This village has roads to Vácszentlászló, Dány, Kóka, Tóalmás, Jászfényszaru and Tura. There are regularly buses to Gödöllő and Hungary's capital city, Budapest. There are rare buses to Tóalmás, Tura and Jászberény. The nearest motorway is the M3 which can be approached through Gödöllő, Bag and Hatvan. Although Zsámbok doesn't have any railway stations, there are ones in Tura, Jászfényszaru, Sülysáp and Isaszeg not far away from the village.

== History ==
In the Middle Ages, Zsámbok was located in a southern area. Due to the frequent floods, the population moved higher, to its current place. Zsámbok's name was written first on a diploma released in 1328. The name of the settlement desires from Champagnian earls. Other theory says it comes from an adjective which perfectly describes the territory of Hajta, which is a creek near Zsámbok. The name itself has gone through many changes:

- 1328: Sambuc
- 1380: Sambok
- 1470: Tót Sambok
- 1561: Sombok, Sombog
- 1562: Sombok
- 1660: Sambok
- 1666: Zsambok
- 1675: Zsámbok

The similarity of Zsámbok and another town called Zsámbék caused many problems. The idea of renaming Zsámbok to Nagyzsámbok was refused.

After Zsámbok had been a possession of Sigismond, his wife, Barbara, Albert, Elizabeth, its owner were the Zsámboky and Kókay family. In 1754 the Beniczky family arrived in the village. Lenke Bajza wrote her novels in this settlement. The Benickzy family later emigrated to England. Zsámbok was also populated when it was a part of the Ottoman Hungary. In 1600, due to destructions Zsámbok was the third-most-populated settlement in the vicinity after Vác and Hévíz (even in 1785 Gödöllő, which is now a large town of the region, had only a population of 720).

During the Hungarian Revolution of 1848 there were no battles in Zsámbok, but bevies went through the village. After the Austro-Hungarian Compromise it was hard to make a living in Zsámbok: there were no facilities to work. The settlement didn't develop during this time. The First World War made the conditions worse: many people became soldiers, which led the population to decrease: 68 people died, and many other got lost. Zsámbok's traditions were also in danger. Between the two World Wars a new school, pharmacy, kindergarten were built, and a lot of new roads went through the village. During the Second World War many people died and a lot of monuments and buildings were destroyed, including the Schell castle. The third castle was literally taken apart after Zsámbok had become released. The village started in improve: for example, the school was rebuilt. In 1953, the World Peace Council held a ceremony in Zsámbok, due to its beautiful costumes.

From 1975, Valkó, Vácszentlászló and Zsámbok had a common council. Since the latter received only a small amount of money, the village decided – after a public voting – to separate.

== Demographics ==
As of 2022, the town was 89.7% Hungarian, 3.8% Gypsy, and 3.1% of non-European origin. The remainder chose not to respond. The population was 41.5% Roman Catholic, and 5.3% Reformed.

== Education ==
=== Kindergartens ===
- Kacó Napközi Otthonos Óvoda

=== Elementary schools ===
- Bajza Lenke Elementary School
