= Renáta Szimon =

Hungarian politician

Member of the National Assembly
- Assuming office 9 May 2026
- Succeeding: Károly Pánczél
- Constituency: Pest 11th

Personal details
- Party: Tisza

Renáta Szimon is a Hungarian politician who was elected member of the National Assembly in 2026 representing the Pest County 11th constituency. She previously worked at banks.
