= Vácszentlászló =

- Village
- Seal

- Location within Hungary
- Coordinates: 47.573119°N 19.535261°E
- Country: Hungary
- Region: Central Hungary
- County: Pest
- Subregion: Gödöllői

Government
  - Mayor: Tibor Horváth László

Area
  - Total: 29.87 km^{2} (11.53 sq mi)

Population (2011)
  - Total: 2,105 ▼
  - Density: 70.47/km^{2} (182.5/sq mi)
- Time zone: UTC+1 (CET)
  - Summer (DST): UTC+2 (CEST)
- Postal code: 2115
- Area code: 28
- Website: vacszentlaszlo.hu

Vácszentlászló is a village in Pest County in Hungary.

== Location ==
Vácszentlászló is located in central Hungary, in the eastern part of Pest County.

== Transportation ==
Vácszentlászló has roads to Valkó, Tura and Zsámbok. This village has regular buses to Zsámbok, Gödöllő and Budapest, but rare buses travels to Tóalmás and Jászberény, too. The nearest motorway is the M3, which can be approached through Hatvan, Bag and Gödöllő. The nearest railway station is located in Tura.

== History ==
Artefacts from the Iron Age were found in Vácszentlászló. Its name was first mentioned in a diploma written in 1394. During the Long War the whole village died. It had a population by 1689 again. Until 1840, it was called Valkószentlászló, then it received its current name.

== Education ==
=== Kindergartens ===
- Napköziotthonos Óvoda

=== Elementary schools ===
- Szent László Elementary School
