= Ildikó Trompler =

Hungarian politician

Member of the National Assembly
- Assuming office 9 May 2026
- Succeeding: Lajos Szűcs
- Constituency: Pest 7th

Personal details
- Party: Tisza

Ildikó Trompler is a Hungarian politician who was elected member of the National Assembly in 2026 representing the Pest County 7th constituency. She previously worked as a dietitian.
