= Lajos Szűcs =

Lajos Szűcs may refer to:

- Lajos Szűcs (footballer, born 1943), Hungarian footballer and double Olympic medalist
- Lajos Szűcs (footballer, born 1973), Hungarian footballer and 1996 Olympic participant
- Lajos Szűcs (politician) (born 1964), Hungarian politician and Member of Parliament
- Lajos Szűcs (weightlifter) (1946–1999), Hungarian weightlifter and Olympic silver medalist in 1972
