= Valkó =

- Village
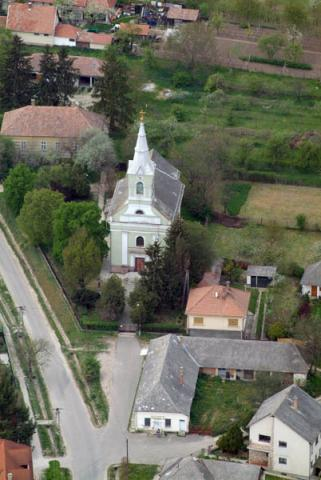
- A Catholic church in Valkó

- Seal

- Location within Hungary
- Coordinates: 47.566469°N 19.491981°E
- Country: Hungary
- Region: Central Hungary
- County: Pest
- Subregion: Gödöllői

Government
  - Mayor: Szilárd Sziráki

Area
  - Total: 37.59 km^{2} (14.51 sq mi)

Population (2010)
  - Total: 2,566 ▲
  - Density: 68.26/km^{2} (176.8/sq mi)
- Time zone: UTC+1 (CET)
  - Summer (DST): UTC+2 (CEST)
- Postal code: 2114
- Area code: 28
- Website: valko.hu

Valkó is a large village in the county of Pest in Hungary.

== Location ==
Valkó is located in central Hungary, in the eastern part of Pest County.

== Transportation ==
This settlement has roads to Vácszentlászló and Gödöllő. Valkó has regular buses to Vácszentlászló, Gödöllő and Budapest, but rare buses travels to Tóalmás and Jászberény, too. The nearest motorway is the M3, which can be approached through Gödöllő. The nearest railway stations are located in Tura and Gödöllő.

== Education ==
=== Kindergartens ===
- Napköziotthonos Óvoda

=== Elementary schools ===
- Móra Ferenc Elementary School
