= Acsa =

- Coat of arms

- Location of Acsa in Hungary
- Coordinates: 47°47′49.45″N 19°22′53.54″E
- Country: Hungary
- Region: Central Hungary
- County: Pest
- Subregion: Váci
- Rank: Village

Government
  - Mayor: Rezső Szekeres

Area
  - Total: 26.94 km^{2} (10.40 sq mi)

Population (1 January 2008)
  - Total: 1,528
  - Density: 56.72/km^{2} (146.9/sq mi)
- Time zone: UTC+1 (CET)
  - Summer (DST): UTC+2 (CEST)
- Postal code: 2683
- Area code: +36 27
- KSH code: 18573
- Website: www.acsa.hu/index.php

Acsa is a village in Pest County, Hungary.

== Location ==
The village lies at the foot of the Cserhát hills by the upper River Galga in Pest County, near the border with Nógrád County.

== Population ==
Most of Acsa's population is Slovak.

== Communications ==
Route 2108 serves the village by road from Aszód and Balassagyarmat. Stopping trains of the Hungarian State Railways serve the village on line 78 (Aszód–Balassagyarmat–Ipolytarnóc). Acsa and Erdőkürt share a station ("Acsa-Erdőkürt"), between Püspökhatvan and Galgaguta.

== Name ==
The village's name comes from the old Hungarian personal name Acsa. The personal name may originate from the Turkic ača, meaning "kindred". It was recorded as Acha in 1341.

== History ==
At that time the village was owned by the Achai family and from 1422 it was the Palatine Miklós Garai's property. During Turkish rule (see Ottoman Hungary) the village was demolished, but later on Slovaks settled. From 1730 the village was the Prónay family's land.

== Landmarks ==
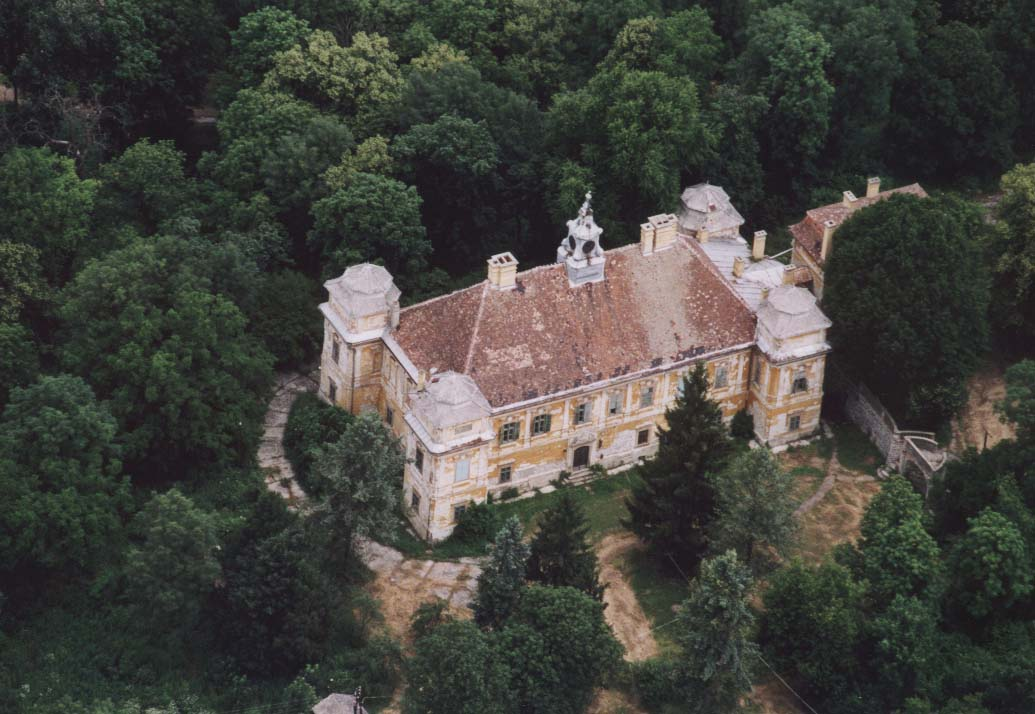
Prónay Castle

- The baroque Prónay castle, which was built around 1775 by Giovanni Battista Carlone (it is in Acsaújlak, but is not open to visitors)
- The ruins of Csővár to the north
- The Roman Catholic church, built in 1747
- The village museum

== Famous people ==
Sándor Prónay, knight and chamberlain, was born in Acsa in 1760.
