= Károly Pánczél =

Hungarian politician

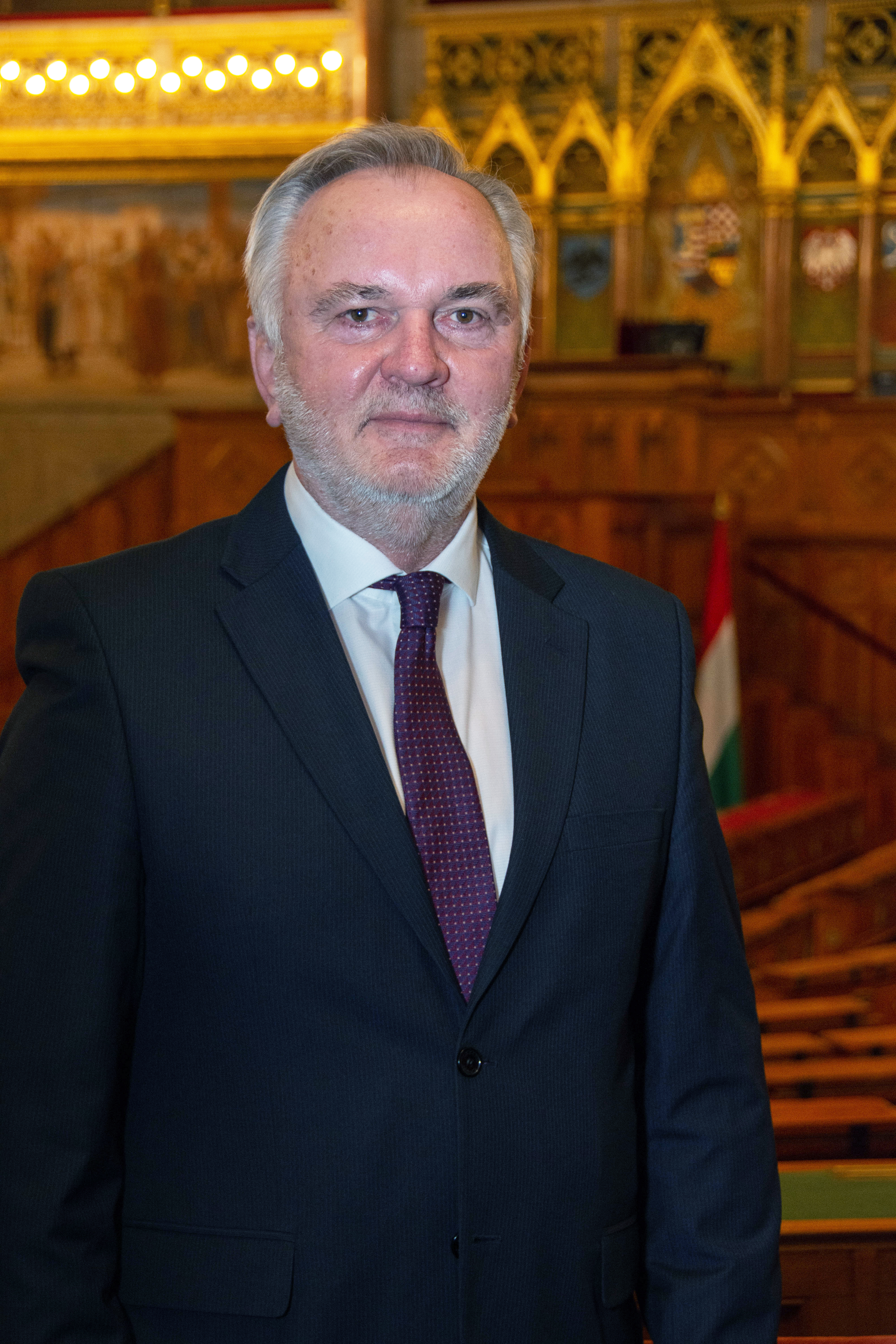

Member of the National Assembly
- In office 18 June 1998 – 8 May 2026

Personal details
- Born: 3 March 1961 (age 65) Budapest, Hungary
- Party: Fidesz (since 1990)
- Spouse: Judit Pánczélné Vinnai
- Children: Judit
- Profession: teacher, politician

Károly Pánczél (born April 3, 1961) is a Hungarian teacher and politician, member of the National Assembly (MP) for Ráckeve (Pest County Constituency XIII) from 2002 to 2006 and from 2010 to 2014. He was also Member of Parliament from the Pest County Regional List of Fidesz between 1998–2002 and 2006–2010. He was elected MP for Dabas (Pest County Constituency XI) in 2014, 2018 and 2022.

== Career ==
He joined Fidesz in 1990 and was active as a member of the Education Policy Working Group. He was also elected to the Pest County Board of the party in 1993. He has been on the National Board of the party since 1995. After the structural transformation of Fidesz he was appointed president of the Ráckeve constituency. He was elected to the General Assembly of Gyál in the local elections of September–October 1990. He chaired the Committee on Education and Culture until he was elected deputy mayor in 1993. He held the position until 2014.

He was a candidate in the general election in April 1994. He was elected incumbent representative to the County Assembly in the local elections in December 1994. In 1998 he was elected MP from the party's Pest County Regional List. He was re-elected as a local representative and deputy mayor in Gyál in October 1998. He was elected deputy head of the Gyál branch of Fidesz the same year. He secured a seat for Ráckeve in the parliamentary election in 2002. After the inauguration of the new Parliament on 15 May he continued to work in the Education and Science Committee. He was elected to the Gyál City Assembly for the fourth time on 20 October. In the parliamentary election held in 2006, he was elected from the Pest county Regional List. He was a member of the Committee on Education and Science from June 25, 1998, to May 5, 2014. He was the President of the National Cohesion Committee from June 23, 2014 to May 8, 2026. He did not run in the 2026 Hungarian parliamentary election.

== Personal life ==
He is married. His wife is Judit Pánczélné Vinnai. They have a daughter, Judit.
