= Kosd =

Kosd Košd (in Slovak)
- Village
- Flag Coat of arms

- Location of Kosd
- Coordinates: 47.80463°N 19.17725°E
- Country: Hungary
- Region: Central Hungary
- County: Pest
- District: Vác

Area
  - Total: 34.07 km^{2} (13.15 sq mi)

Population (1 January 2026)
  - Total: 2,480
  - Density: 72.8/km^{2} (189/sq mi)
- Time zone: UTC+1 (CET)
  - Summer (DST): UTC+2 (CEST)
- Postal code: 2612
- Area code: (+36) 27
- Website: www.kosd.hu

Kosd is a village in Pest county, Hungary.
