= Trebeľovce =

Trebeľovce Terbeléd
- Municipality
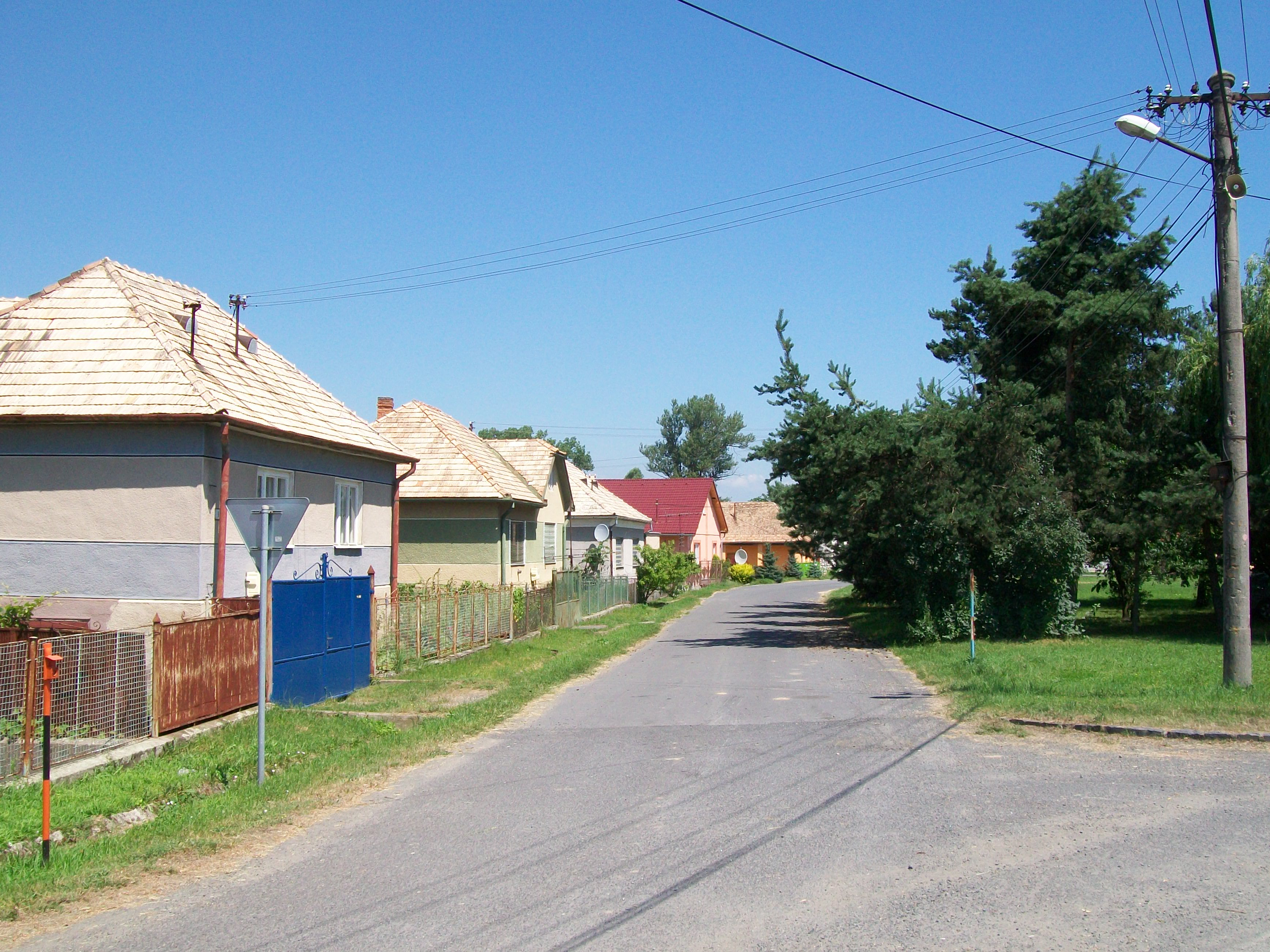

- Flag

- Location of Trebeľovce in the Banská Bystrica Region Location of Trebeľovce in Slovakia
- Coordinates: 48.28°N 19.72°E
- Country: Slovakia
- Region: Banská Bystrica Region
- District: Lučenec District
- First mentioned: 1246

Area
  - Total: 19.52 km^{2} (7.54 sq mi)
- Elevation: 183 m (600 ft)

Population (2025)
  - Total: 834
- Time zone: UTC+1 (CET)
  - Summer (DST): UTC+2 (CEST)
- Postal code: 985 31
- Area code: +421 47
- Vehicle registration plate (until 2022): LC
- Website: www.obectrebelovce.sk

Trebeľovce (Hungarian: Terbeléd) is a village and municipality in the Lučenec District in the Banská Bystrica Region of Slovakia.

== Geography ==
The municipality lies at an altitude of 183 metres (600 ft) and covers an area of 19.52 km^{2} (7.54 sq mi) (2025).

== Population ==
Population statistic (10 years)
Year	1995	2005	2015	2025
Count	948	957	947	834
Difference		+0.94%	−1.04%	−11.93%

Population statistic
Year	2024	2025
Count	840	834
Difference		−0.71%

It has a population of 834 people (31 December 2025).

=== Ethnicity ===
Census 2021 (1+ %)
Ethnicity	Number	Fraction
Slovak	720	83.04%
Hungarian	137	15.8%
Not found out	34	3.92%
Total	867	

In year 2021 was 867 people by ethnicity 720 as Slovak, 137 as Hungarian, 34 as Not found out, 5 as Czech, 4 as Romani, 1 as Polish, 1 as Moravian and 1 as English.

Note on population: The difference values of population numbers in the table "Population statistic" and in the sections "Ethnicity" & "Religion" is caused by the use of various statistical methods.

=== Religion ===
Census 2021 (1+ %)
Religion	Number	Fraction
Roman Catholic Church	574	66.21%
None	202	23.3%
Not found out	40	4.61%
Evangelical Church	28	3.23%
Christian Congregations in Slovakia	12	1.38%
Total	867	

In year 2021 was 867 people by religion 574 from Roman Catholic Church, 202 from None, 40 from Not found out, 28 from Evangelical Church, 12 from Christian Congregations in Slovakia, 5 from Greek Catholic Church, 3 from Calvinist Church, 1 from Jewish community, 1 from Buddhism and 1 from Ad hoc movements.
