= Lajos Szűcs (politician) =

Hungarian jurist and politician

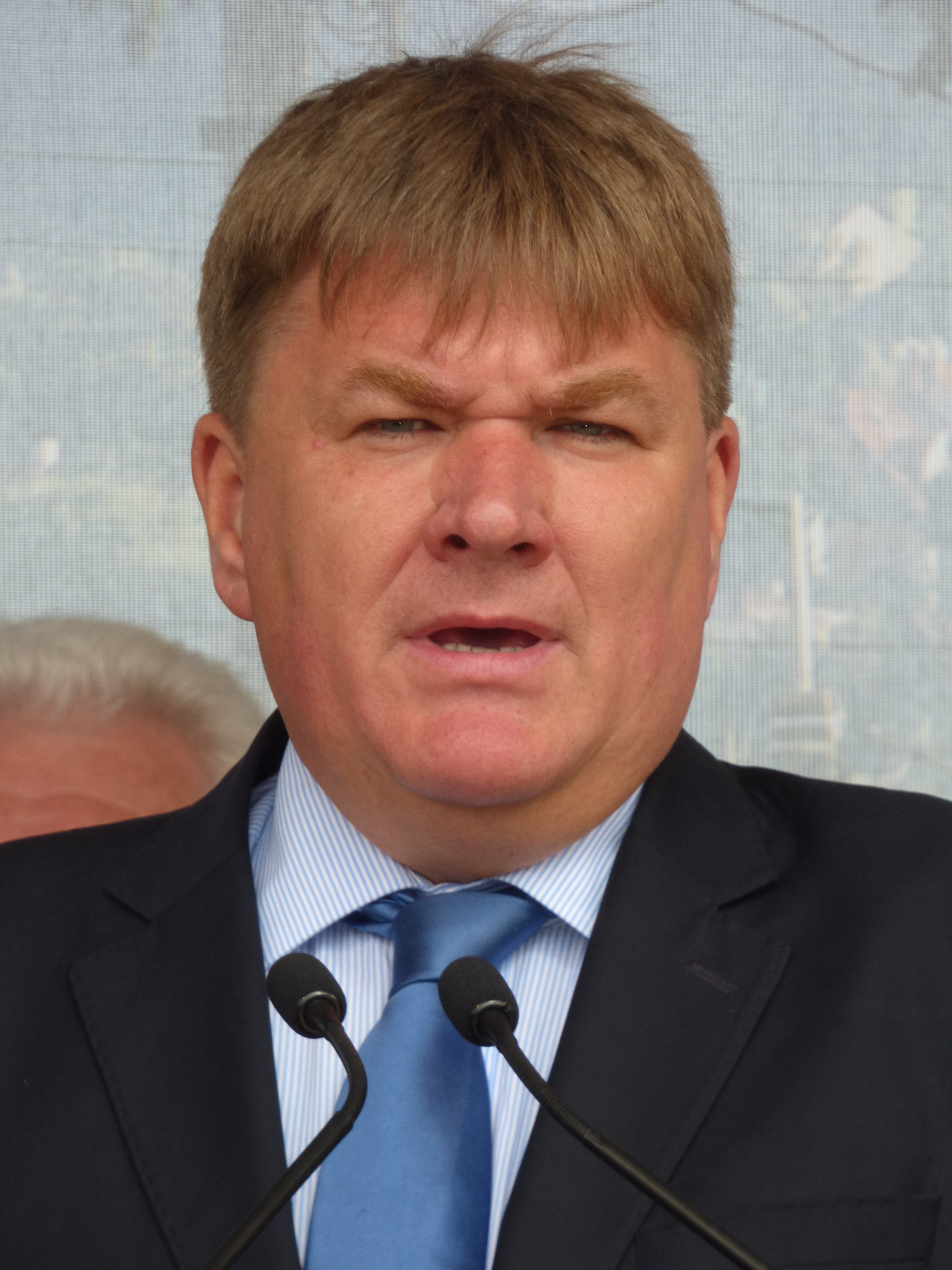

Member of the National Assembly
- In office 17 April 2001 – 8 May 2026

Personal details
- Born: 15 September 1964 (age 62) Budapest, Hungary
- Party: Fidesz (since 1993)
- Children: Barbara; Anett
- Profession: jurist, politician

Dr. Lajos Szűcs (born 15 September 1964) is a Hungarian jurist and politician, member of the National Assembly (MP) for Dabas (Pest County Constituency XIV) from 2001 to 2014 and for Vecsés (Pest County Constituency VII) from 2014 to 2026.

== Early life ==
Szűcs finished Puskás Tivadar Secondary Technical School of Telecommunications Engineering with a professional qualification in 1982. He received his degree in public education studies and pedagogy in a distance learning course at Eszterházy Károly Teacher's Training College in Eger in 1992. His second degree is in public administration from the College of Public of Administration in Budapest, obtained in 1998. He studied law at Eötvös Loránd University of Budapest between 1999 and 2008. He is active in several NGOs including the National Civil Guards' Alliance, the Alliance for the Protection of the Village of Ócsa and the Ócsa Club. During the 1990 local elections, he worked as a campaign manager for Ócsa and later as an officer in charge of public education and mayoral affairs in the local mayor's office.

== Political career ==
He founded the Ócsa branch of Fidesz with Attila Buza, mayor of Ócsa, in November 1993. He was elected to both the party's county and National Board. In the 1998 parliamentary election, he was again head of campaign and became his personal assistant when Buza had secured a seat in Parliament. In the 1998 local elections, he was elected to the General Assembly of Pest County.

He was elected MP in the by-election held on 13 April 2001, succeeding Attila Buza, who died in a car accident. Szűcs served in the Committee on Health and Social Affairs and the Immunity, Incompatibility, and Mandate Committee. He was elected incumbent MP in the 2002 election, representing Dabas. He had been on the Committee on Social and Family Affairs since May 2002. He was elected to the local assembly in Ócsa in the October 2002 local elections. He was appointed one of the recorders of the National Assembly in October 2004. In the parliamentary election held in 2006, he was elected MP for Dabas. He was elected member of the Committee on Immunity, Incompatibility, and Mandate on 30 May 2006. He served as President of the General Assembly of Pest County between 2006 and 2010. He was elected MP for the fourth time in the 2010 parliamentary election. He was a member of the Municipal and Regional Development Committee from 2010 to 2014. Szűcs was re-elected MP for Pest County 7th constituency (Vecsés) in 2014 and 2018. He has been a member of the Legislative Committee and vice-chairman of the Committee on Budgets since 2014.

== Non-political career ==
On 29 January 2011 he was elected President of the Hungarian Tennis Association. On 22 September 2012 he was re-elected. After 4 years, he was confirmed in his position on 10 December 2016. In 2018 the Hungarian taxation authority started investigation against the Federation. In May 2020 the Federation had a deficit of 3.5 billion HUF (10.8 million USD), the whole presidency resigned, except Szűcs and vice president Zsolt Bohács. On 27 July 2020 the Federation elected János Lázár for new president.

Szűcs also served as President of the Hungarian National Fishing Association (MOHOSZ) between 2014 and 2026.

Sporting positions
Preceded by Tünde Nagy	President of the Hungarian Tennis Association; 29 January 2011 – 27 July 2020	Succeeded by János Lázár
