= Iklad =

- Coat of arms

- Location of Iklad in Hungary
- Coordinates: 47.65798°N 19.45117°E
- Country: Hungary
- Region: Central Hungary
- County: Pest
- Subregion: Aszódi
- Rank: Village

Area
  - Total: 11.22 km^{2} (4.33 sq mi)

Population (1 January 2008)
  - Total: 2,138
  - Density: 190.6/km^{2} (493.5/sq mi)
- Time zone: UTC+1 (CET)
  - Summer (DST): UTC+2 (CEST)
- Postal code: 2181
- Area code: +36 28
- KSH code: 03300
- Website: www.iklad.hu

Iklad is a village in Pest county, Hungary.
