= Vácegres =

Coordinates: 47°40′44″N 19°22′06″E

- Country: Hungary
- Region: Central Hungary
- County: Pest

Vácegres is a village in Pest County in Hungary. It was formerly known as Zsidó until 1943.
