= Kartal, Hungary =

Kartal
- Village (község)
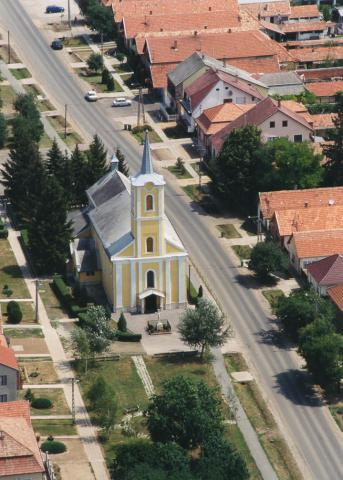
- Aerial photo of Kartal

- Coat of arms

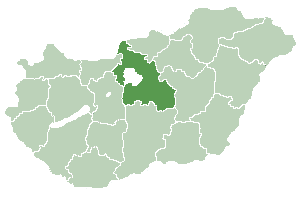
- Location of Pest County in Hungary

- Location of Kartal in Hungary
- Coordinates: 47°43′01″N 19°31′42″E
- Country: Hungary
- Region: Central Hungary
- County: Pest County
- Subregion: Aszód

Government
  - Mayor: Sándor Kanyó

Area
  - Total: 29.11 km^{2} (11.24 sq mi)
- Elevation: 159 m (522 ft)

Population (1 Jan. 2014)
  - Total: 5 622
  - Density: 203.06/km^{2} (525.9/sq mi)
- Postal code: 2173
- Area code: 28
- Website: http://www.kartal.hu/

Kartal is a large village in Pest County, Hungary.

It is led by mayor Klára Mária Oláh.
