= Hévízgyörk =

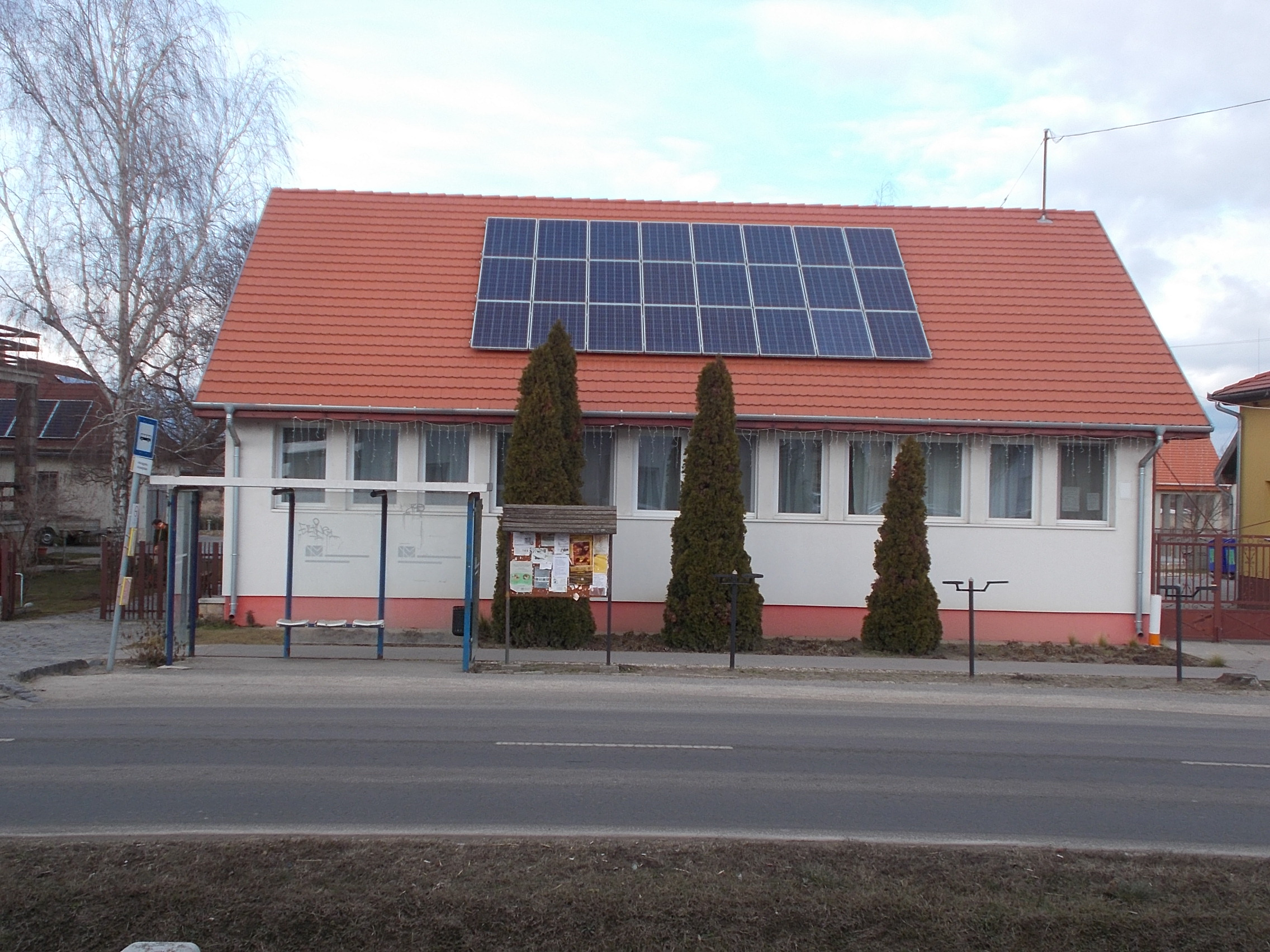
- Village hall

- Flag Coat of arms

- Location of Hévízgyörk in Hungary
- Coordinates: 47.63157°N 19.52002°E
- Country: Hungary
- Region: Central Hungary
- County: Pest
- Subregion: Aszódi
- Rank: Village

Area
  - Total: 22.94 km^{2} (8.86 sq mi)

Population (2017)
  - Total: 3,031
  - Density: 132.1/km^{2} (342.2/sq mi)
- Time zone: UTC+1 (CET)
  - Summer (DST): UTC+2 (CEST)
- Postal code: 2192
- Area code: +36 28
- KSH code: 13949
- Website: www.hevizgyork.hu

Hévízgyörk is a village in Pest county, Hungary.

Hévízgyörk honlapja

Hévízgyörk a Wikipédián
