= Galgahévíz =

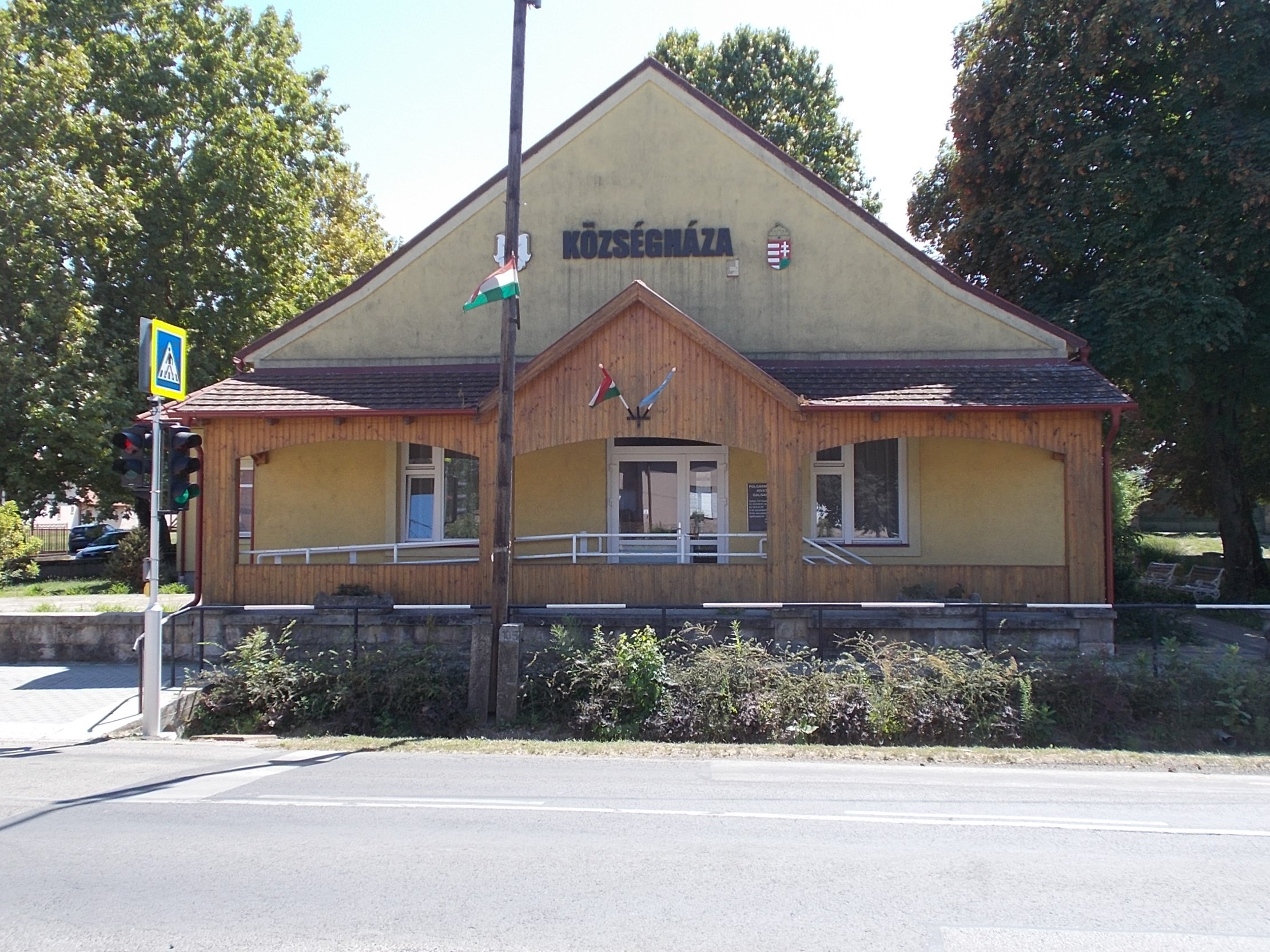
- Village hall

- Coat of arms

- Location of Galgahévíz in Hungary
- Coordinates: 47.62241°N 19.55148°E
- Country: Hungary
- Region: Central Hungary
- County: Pest
- Subregion: Aszódi
- Rank: Village

Area
  - Total: 31.18 km^{2} (12.04 sq mi)

Population (1 January 2008)
  - Total: 2,512
  - Density: 80.56/km^{2} (208.7/sq mi)
- Time zone: UTC+1 (CET)
  - Summer (DST): UTC+2 (CEST)
- Postal code: 2193
- Area code: +36 28
- KSH code: 19503
- Website: www.galgaheviz.hu

Galgahévíz is a village in Pest county, Hungary.

== International relations ==
=== Twin towns – Sister cities ===
Galgahévíz is twinned with:

- Rahden in Germany
