= Galgagyörk =

Galgagyörk Ďurka (in Slovak)
- Village
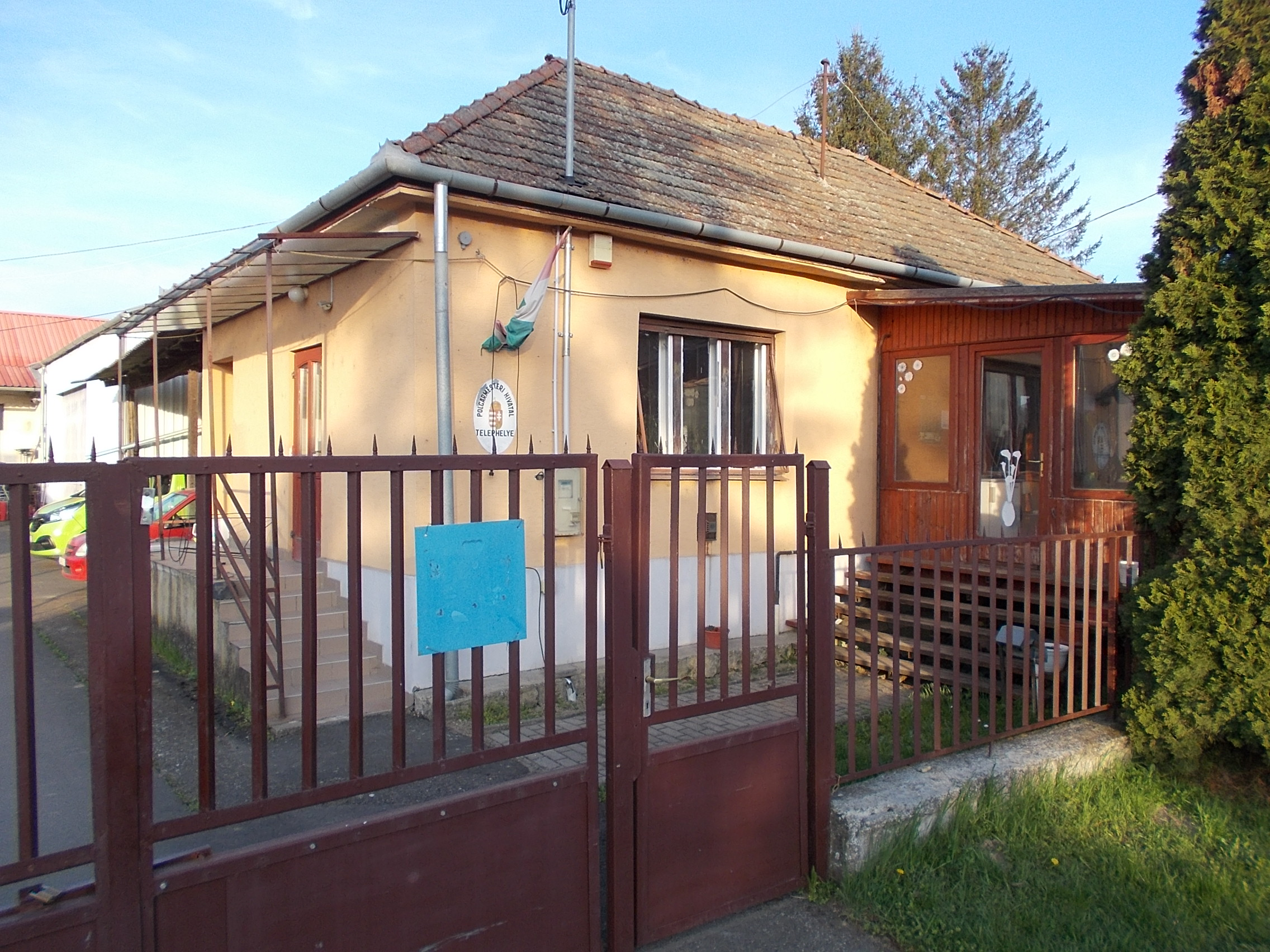
- Village hall

- Flag Coat of arms

- Location of Galgagyörk
- Coordinates: 47.74107°N 19.37544°E
- Country: Hungary
- Region: Central Hungary
- County: Pest
- District: Vác

Area
  - Total: 14.72 km^{2} (5.68 sq mi)

Population (1 January 2025)
  - Total: 930
  - Density: 63/km^{2} (160/sq mi)
- Time zone: UTC+1 (CET)
  - Summer (DST): UTC+2 (CEST)
- Postal code: 2681
- Area code: (+36) 27
- Website: www.galgagyork.hu

Galgagyörk is a village in Pest county, Hungary.
