= Galgamácsa =

- Coat of arms

- Location of Galgamácsa in Hungary
- Coordinates: 47.69511°N 19.38439°E
- Country: Hungary
- Region: Central Hungary
- County: Pest
- Subregion: Veresegyházi
- Rank: Village

Area
  - Total: 43.31 km^{2} (16.72 sq mi)

Population (1 January 2008)
  - Total: 1,981
  - Density: 45.74/km^{2} (118.5/sq mi)
- Time zone: UTC+1 (CET)
  - Summer (DST): UTC+2 (CEST)
- Postal code: 2183
- Area code: +36 28
- KSH code: 27128
- Website: https://www.galgamacsa.hu/

Galgamácsa is a village in Pest county, Hungary. Since 2019, the mayor has been Tamás Ecker.

Since 1977, the village has had a museum, the Vankóné Dudás Juli Memorial House, dedicated primarily to the work of folk artist Juli Vankóné Dudás, born in Galgamácsa. She contributed significantly to its creation.

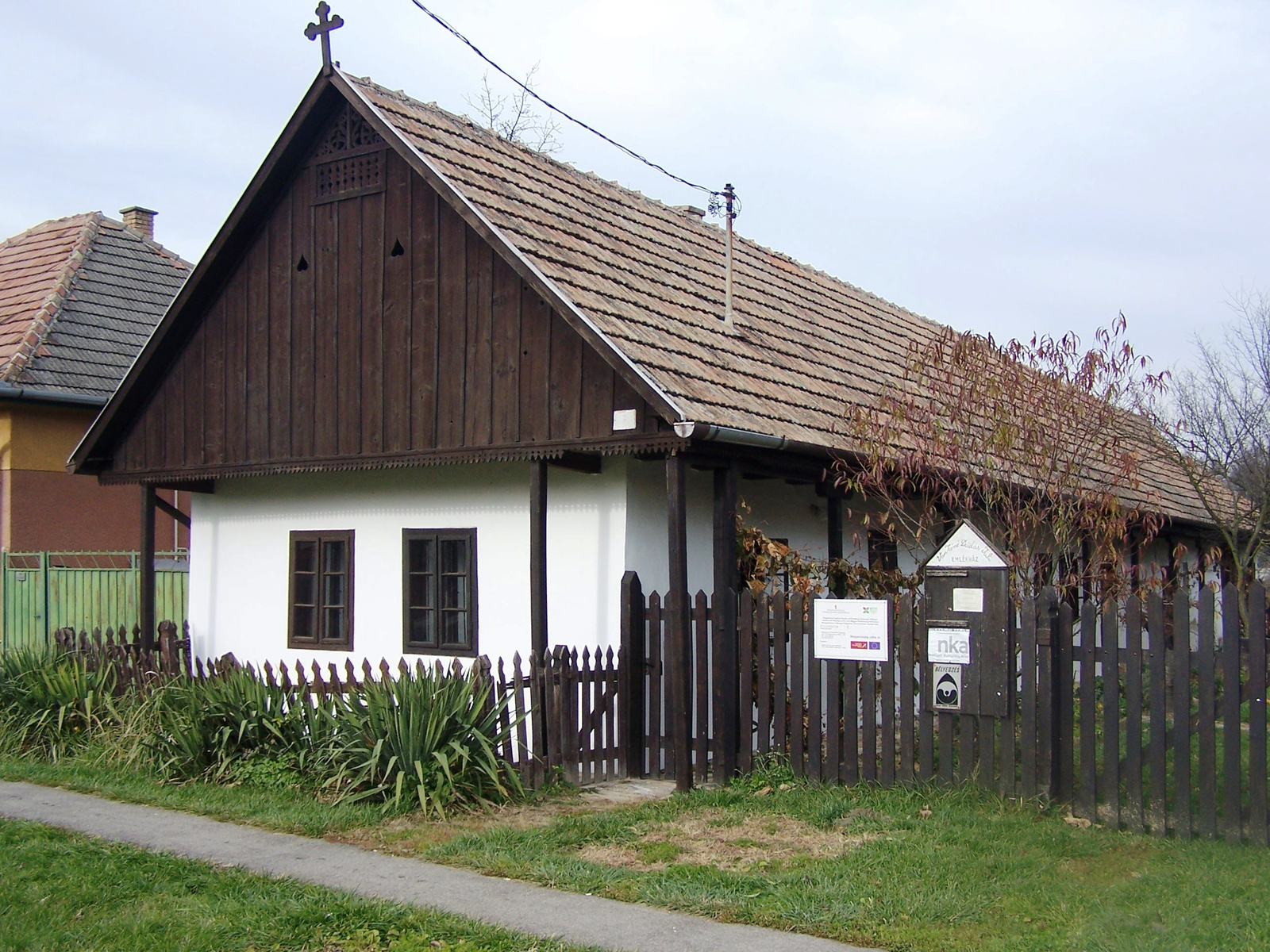
Vankóné Dudás Juli Memorial House

== Demographics ==
As of 2021, the population was 1837 individuals. 88.5% of the population described themselves as Hungarian, 0.9% as Roma, 0.4% as Bulgarian, 0.4% as German, 0.3% as Slovak, 0.2% as Romanian, 0.1% as Serbian, 0.3% as other non-Hungarian, and 11.5% did not answer. Most of the population is Roman Catholic (55.3%), with a sizeable minority of Lutherans and other Protestants and those who identified not belonging to a religious denomination.

== History ==
The earliest known mention of the village is in the 1230s. In the 14th century Turkish occupation, all of the buildings of the village except the church were destroyed.
