= Váchartyán =

- Village
- Flag Coat of arms

- Location of Váchartyán
- Coordinates: 47.724722°N 19.259722°E
- Country: Hungary
- Region: Central Hungary
- County: Pest
- District: Vác

Area
  - Total: 12.11 km^{2} (4.68 sq mi)

Population (1 January 2026)
  - Total: 1,759
  - Density: 145.3/km^{2} (376.2/sq mi)
- Time zone: UTC+1 (CET)
  - Summer (DST): UTC+2 (CEST)
- Postal code: 2164
- Area code: (+36) 27
- Website: www.vachartyan.hu

Váchartyán is a village and commune in the comitatus of Pest in Hungary.
