= Tóalmás =

- Village
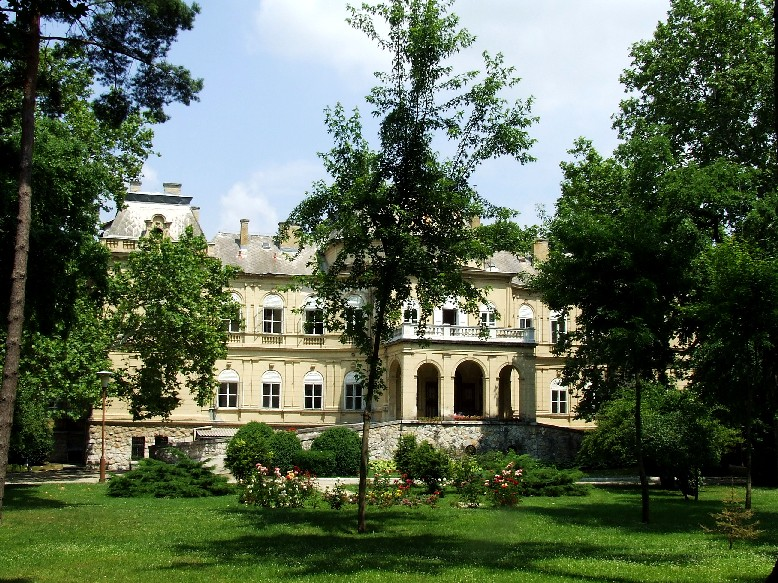
- The Andrassy Castle and park in Tóalmás

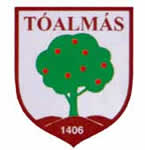
- Coat of arms

- Location of Tóalmás in Hungary
- Coordinates: 47°30′44.60″N 19°40′4.33″E
- Country: Hungary
- Region: Central Hungary
- County: Pest
- Subregion: Nagykátai
- Rank: Village

Area
  - Total: 39.34 km^{2} (15.19 sq mi)

Population (1 January 2008)
  - Total: 3,375
  - Density: 85.79/km^{2} (222.2/sq mi)
- Time zone: UTC+1 (CET)
  - Summer (DST): UTC+2 (CEST)
- Postal code: 2252
- Area code: +36 29
- KSH code: 21467
- Website: www.toalmas.hu

Tóalmás is a village in Pest county, Hungary.

== History ==
The village first appears in writing in 1406 under the name "Almás". During the Árpád dynasty, the land belonged to a nearby Premonstratensian monastery. A settlement began to emerge here in the 11th and 12th centuries.

== Demographics ==
As of 2023, the village had a total population of 3990. As of 2022, the town was 87.7% Hungarian, 2.9% Gypsy, 0.4% Romanian, and 1.4% of non-European origin. The remainder chose not to respond. The population was 21.7% Roman Catholic, and 4.4% Reformed.
