= Csővár =

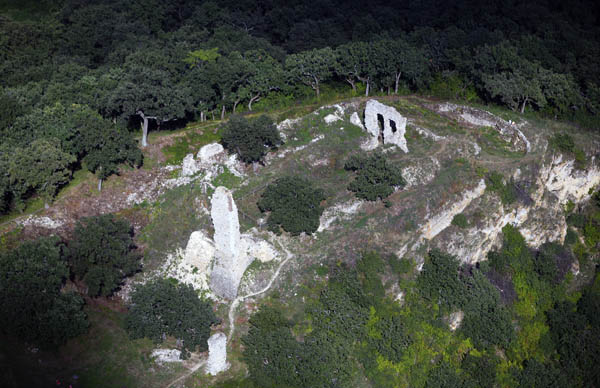
- Aerial view of the ruins of Csővár castle near Csővár

- Coat of arms

- Location of Csővár in Hungary
- Coordinates: 47°48′34.56″N 19°19′29.60″E
- Country: Hungary
- Region: Central Hungary
- County: Pest
- Subregion: Váci
- Rank: Village

Government
  - Mayor: Dian József

Area
  - Total: 17.17 km^{2} (6.63 sq mi)
- Time zone: UTC+1 (CET)
  - Summer (DST): UTC+2 (CEST)
- Postal code: 2615
- Area code: +36 27
- Website: https://www.csovar.hu/

Csővár is a village in Pest county, Hungary. Its name comes from the Hungarian words cső (tube) and vár (tower).
