= Püspökhatvan =

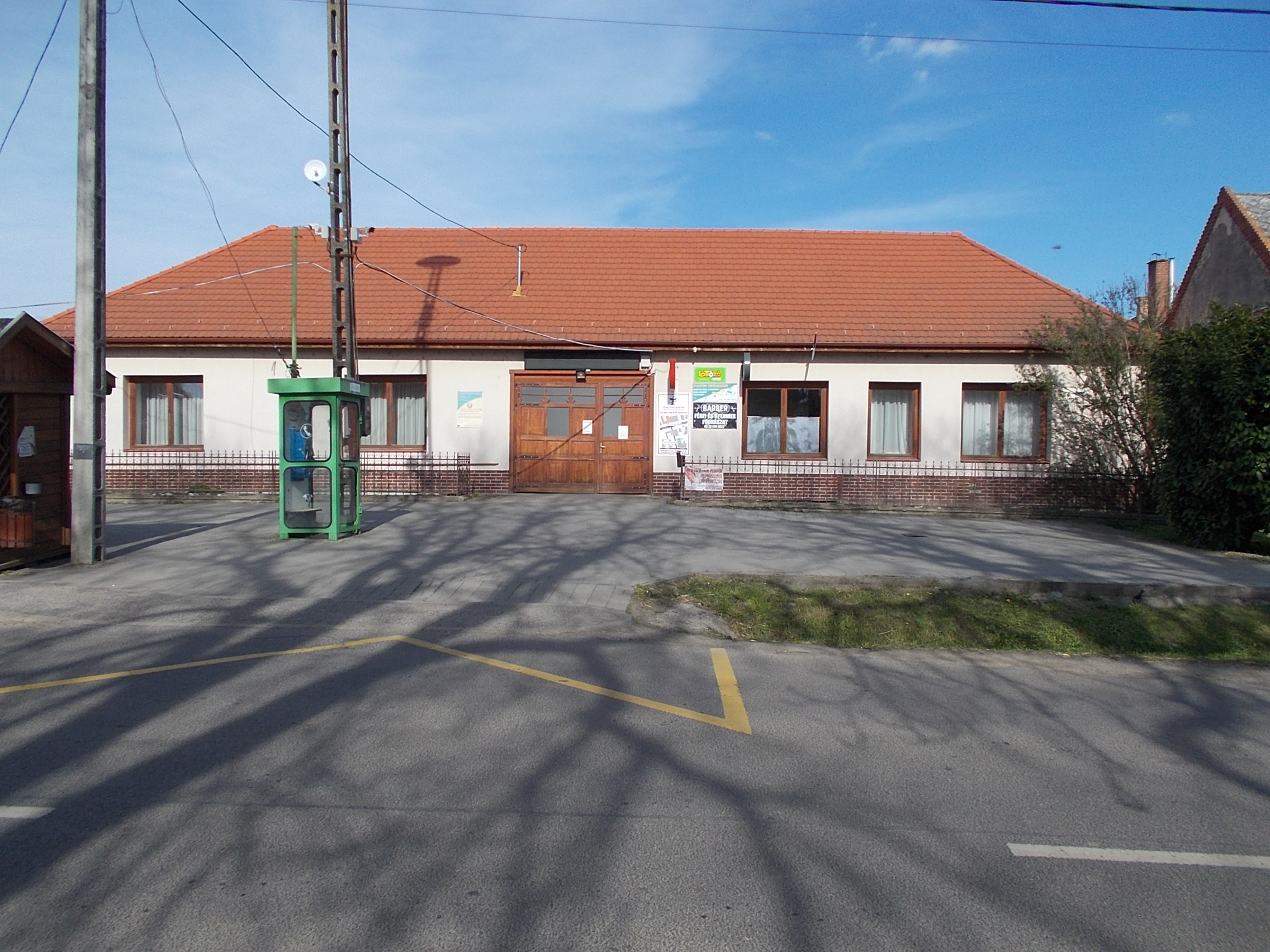
- Village hall

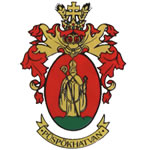
- Coat of arms

- Location of Püspökhatvan in Hungary
- Coordinates: 47.77525°N 19.36800°E
- Country: Hungary
- Region: Central Hungary
- County: Pest
- Subregion: Váci
- Rank: Village

Area
  - Total: 24.73 km^{2} (9.55 sq mi)

Population (1 January 2008)
  - Total: 1,527
  - Density: 61.75/km^{2} (159.9/sq mi)
- Time zone: UTC+1 (CET)
  - Summer (DST): UTC+2 (CEST)
- Postal code: 2682
- Area code: +36 27
- KSH code: 21388
- Website: www.puspokhatvan.hu

Püspökhatvan is a village in Pest county, Hungary.
