= Tura, Hungary =

Tura
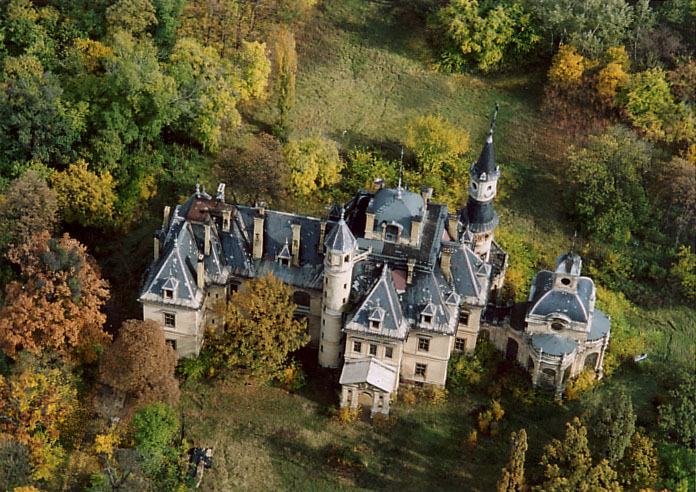
- Schossberger Castle in Tura

- Flag Coat of arms

- Location of Tura in Hungary
- Coordinates: 47.61°N 19.60°E
- Country: Hungary
- Region: Central Hungary
- County: Pest
- Rank: City

Government
  - Mayor: Ferenc Szendrei (Independent)

Area
  - Total: 55.92 km^{2} (21.59 sq mi)

Population (2009)
  - Total: 7,945
  - Density: 142.1/km^{2} (368.0/sq mi)
- Time zone: UTC+1 (CET)
  - Summer (DST): UTC+2 (CEST)
- Postal code: 2194
- Area code: +36 28
- KSH code: 09593
- Website: www.tura.hu

Tura is a town in Pest County, Hungary. In 2001 Tura became a city.

== Geography ==
Tura lies between the Great Plain and Mátra Hills, in the Galga Valley.

== Communications ==
The Bagi Junction of the M3 motorway and primary route 32 (from Jászfényszarú) serve the town.

Express and stopping trains of the Hungarian State Railways serve the town on the Budapest—Hatvan—Miskolc line.

Around the end of the 19th and start of the 20th centuries the MÁV (Hungarian State Railways) employed more and more people in Tura and it became a railway town.

== History ==
The first mention of Tura is as Thwra in a charter (Latin: Varadi Regestrum) of 1220. At that time the Ákos family owned the town. In 1425 one of the family's descendants, Miklós Ördög Prodavizi, gave the estate to King Sigismund (Hungarian: Zsigmond) in exchange for other properties.

A charter of 1523 mentions that the settlement levied its own taxation. In 1544, after the capture of Buda by the Ottoman Empire three years earlier, Tura came under Turkish rule. The town was never emptied and its church survived that period. Even though in 1594 Simon Forgách won in battle against the Turkish army, the Turkish still ruled Tura for centuries more. In 1633–34 the settlement was mentioned as a Turkish town with two taxable lands. At the end of Turkish rule there were only 61 families in the town.

In the 18th century Tura's population started to grow because of agriculture. Trade improved and people sold their goods in the Buda, Pest, Miskolc, Hatvan, Vác and Gyöngyös markets. In 1740 Tura was Antal Hévizi Nagy’s land and it became a duty-free town. At that time there were 59 taxable houses.

Until 1873 Tura was owned by the Esterházy family, but they sold it to Baron Sigismund Schossberger. On 20 July 1849 one of the biggest battles of the Hungarian Revolution of 1848 took place in Tura, between Mór Perczel's and Alexander Petrovich Tolstoy’s troops. In 1910 there were 900 houses and 4759 inhabitants.

== Economy ==
Tura had a leading role in agriculture. In the Alsó-Galga (Lower Galga) animal breeding and fruit cultivation was significant. Collective farming started in 1949. Later on, industrialisation started to improve too. At one time there were 200 employees. In the 1990s the collective farms started to be privatised and new owners rented them out.

The main industries are vegetable and flower cultivation and the Galga-Coop plc sells the goods at the local market or in Budapest.

In April 2024, the Hungarian oil company MOL found new crude oil deposits near the town.

== Landmarks ==
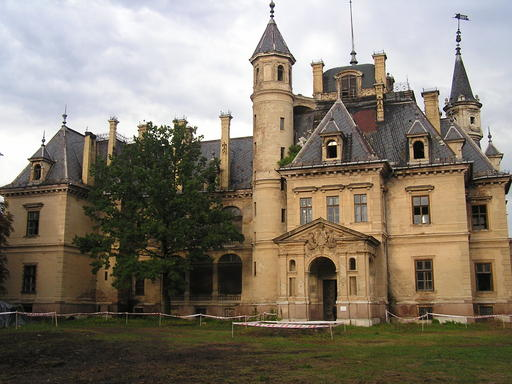
Schossberger Castle

- Roman Catholic church
- Lake Kónya
- Schossberger Castle (by Miklós Ybl, built in 1883). The building is in the middle of a 10-hectare (25-acre) park
- Baroque granary (built in 1808) near the castle
- 200 years old Roman Catholic Church. There are some Gothic ruins under the church
- Folk museum, opened in 1989
- Obelisk to honour the battle of 1849, standing 8 metres (26 ft) high
- Dora Mill
- Town hall, built in 1902
- Nature reserve
- Hot spa.

== Events ==
- Rock festival (every summer)

== Notable people ==
- István Bata (1910–1982), military officer and politician.
- László Gellér (b. 1944), ski champion (competitions in Hungary)
- George de Hevesy (1885–1966), winner of the 1943 Nobel Prize in Chemistry
- Géza Kovács, director of the Hungarian National Philharmonic
- Lászó Kovács (1908–1962), chorister teacher, the inaugural winner of the Kossuth Prize
- Mária Maczkó (b. 1961), folk singer and master of folk art
- József Szaszkó, master of the zither
- Sándor Sára (b. 1933), film director and documentary film maker, the first director of Duna TV
- József Szénási, journalist

== Tura in folk art ==
Tura is famous for its folk songs and needlework. Béla Bartók the composer collected more than 150 folk songs in Tura in 1906. His name is on the wall of the Tura Community Centre. The famous embroidery of Tura boasts a long history and was particularly popular after the Second World War, when many clothing designers began using it in their work.

== Twin towns – sister cities ==
Tura is twinned with:

- Sântimbru, Romania (1990)
- Jasov, Slovakia (1993)
