= Pest County 4th constituency =

- Constituency for the National Assembly
- Location of Pest county 04 within Pest county

- Location of Pest county within Hungary
- County: Pest
- Electorate: 77,292 (2026)
- Major settlements: Szentendre

Current constituency
- Created: 2024
- Party: Tisza Party
- Member: Balázs Tóthmajor
- Elected: 2026

The Pest County 4th parliamentary constituency is one of the 106 constituencies into which the territory of Hungary is divided by Act LXXIX of 2024, and in which voters can elect one member of the National Assembly. The standard abbreviation of the constituency name is: Pest 04. OEVK. The seat is Szentendre.

== Area ==
The constituency includes the following settlements:

1. Bernecebaráti
2. Dunabogdány
3. Ipolydamásd
4. Ipolytölgyes
5. Kemence
6. Kismaros
7. Kisoroszi
8. Kóspallag
9. Leányfalu
10. Letkés
11. Márianosztra
12. Nagybörzsöny
13. Nagymaros
14. Perőcsény
15. Pilisszentlászló
16. Pócsmegyer
17. Pomáz
18. Szentendre
19. Szigetmonostor
20. Szob
21. Szokolya
22. Tahitótfalu
23. Tésa
24. Vámosmikola
25. Verőce
26. Visegrád
27. Zebegény

== Members of Parliament ==
Név	Párt	Terminus	Megjegyzés
Harrach Péter	Fidesz-KDNP	2014 – 2018	Results of the 2014 parliamentary election:
Rétvári Bence	Fidesz-KDNP	2018–2026	Results of the 2018 parliamentary election:
Rétvári Bence	Fidesz-KDNP	2018–2026	Results of the 2022 parliamentary election:
Balázs Tóthmajor	Tisza Party	2026 – present	Results of the 2026 parliamentary election: 55.62%

== Demographics ==
Historical population
Year	Pop.	±%
2011	92,676	—
2022	95,689	+3.3%

The population of the 4th constituency of Pest County was 95,689 on 1 October 2022. The population of the constituency increased by 3,013 between the 2011 and 2022 censuses. Based on the age composition, the majority of the population in the constituency is middle-aged with 35,179 people, while the least is children with 18,081 people. 85.8% of the population of the constituency has internet access.

According to the highest level of completed education, those with a high school diploma are the most numerous, with 29,241 people, followed by graduates with 19,001 people.

According to economic activity, almost half of the population is employed, 47,655 people, the second most significant group is inactive earners, who are mainly pensioners, with 21,126 people.

The most significant ethnic group in the constituency is Germans with 1,138 people and Gypsies with 1,079 people. The proportion of foreign citizens without Hungarian citizenship is 1%.

According to religious composition, the largest religion of the residents of the constituency is Roman Catholic (27,918 people), and a significant community is the Calvinist (5,865 people). The number of those not belonging to a religious community is also significant (8,872 people), the second largest group in the constituency after the Roman Catholic religion.

== Parliamentary elections ==
=== 2022 ===
2022 Hungarian parliamentary election
Party	Candidate
Mi Hazánk	Jenő Páli
Egységben Magyarországért	Gergely Inotay
Normális Élet Pártja	László Pintér
Munkáspárt-ISZOMM	Simon József Ferenc
MEMO	Mantzourakis Sarantis
Fidesz-KDNP	Bence Rétvári
MKKP	Gergely Korga

=== 2018 ===
A 2018-as országgyűlési választás eredménye
Party	Candidate	Votes	%	± %
Fidesz-KDNP	Rétvári Bence	27,559	51.41	▲4.63
Jobbik	Fehér Zsolt	12,824	23.92	▲3.91
LMP	Matkovich Ilona	10,131	18.9	▲14.7
Együtt	Dr. Jakab Zoltán	974	1.82	▼22.98
Momentum	Juhász Béla Róbert	930	1.73	-
Munkáspárt	Simon József Ferenc	366	0.68	▲0.06
Other parties		824	1.32	▼2.03
Turnout		54,314	73.51	▲8.7
Number of voters		73,884	100	▼0.19
Fidesz-KDNP wins the district.

=== 2014 ===
2014 Hungarian parliamentary election
Party	Candidate	Votes	%
Fidesz-KDNP	Péter Harrach	22,193	46.78
Összefogás	Kiss Zsolt János	11,767	24.8
Jobbik	Fehér Zsolt	9,493	20.01
LMP	Dengelegi Klára Zsuzsanna	1,991	4.2
Munkáspárt	Nagy Sándor	295	0.62
Szociáldemokraták	Nógrádi Ferenc	114	0.24
Other parties		1,588	3.35
Turnout		47,976	64,81
Number of voters		74,027	100
Fidesz-KDNP wins the district.

== Opposition primary election – 2021 ==
2021 Hungarian opposition primary
Faction	Nominating organizations	Candidate	Votes	%
Jobbik	Jobbik, LMP, MSZP, Párbeszéd, ÚK, MMM	Gergely Inotay	2,766	48.48
ÚVNP/Momentum	ÚVNP, Momentum, DK, Liberálisok	Robert Bela Juhasz	2,416	42.35
LMP	Független	Adam Gyurcsik	523	9.17
Total votes			5,705	100%
Gergely Inotay wins the district.

== Sources ==
- ↑ Vjt.: "2011. évi CCIII. törvény az országgyűlési képviselők választásáról". Nemzeti Jogszabálytár. Magyar Közlöny Lap- és Könyvkiadó Kft.
- ↑ KSH: "Az országgyűlési egyéni választókerületek adatai". Népszámlálás 2011. Központi Statisztikai Hivatal.
