= List of islands of Hungary =

This is a list of islands of Hungary. Notable islands, islets, and rocks are listed by region.

== Danube ==
=== In Esztergom ===
- Körtvélyesi-sziget
- Nyáros-sziget
- Csitri sziget
- Prímás-sziget
- Helemba-sziget
- Dédai-sziget
- Törpe-sziget

=== In Budapest (from north to south) ===
- Palotai-sziget (in fact, it's a peninsula today)
- Népsziget (connected to the above, but mostly surrounded by water)
- Óbudai-sziget (a.k.a. Hajógyári-sziget, see also Sziget Festival)
- Margitsziget (or Margit-sziget)
- Háros-sziget
- Csepel-sziget (only its tip belongs to Budapest)
- Molnár-sziget

=== Outside Budapest ===
- Czuczor-sziget
- Sport-sziget
- Haraszti-sziget
- Taksony-sziget
- Mohácsi-sziget
- Szentendrei-sziget
- Dunasziget
- Pap-sziget
- Lupa-sziget
- Cseke-sziget
- Gödi-sziget
- Domariba-sziget
- Martuska-sziget
- Szúnyog-sziget
- Kőhidi-sziget
- Petőfi-sziget
- Felsőzátonyi-sziget
- Szalki-sziget
- Nagy-Pandúr-sziget
- Öreg-sziget
- Palánki-sziget
- Veránka-sziget
- Szigetköz

== Tisza ==
- Kácsa-sziget
- Alcsi-sziget
- Farkas-sziget
- Buláti-sziget
- Aranysziget
- Kis-Tisza-sziget
- Korom-sziget

== See also ==
- List of islands
- List of islands of Europe
