= Farkas Heller =

Hungarian economist

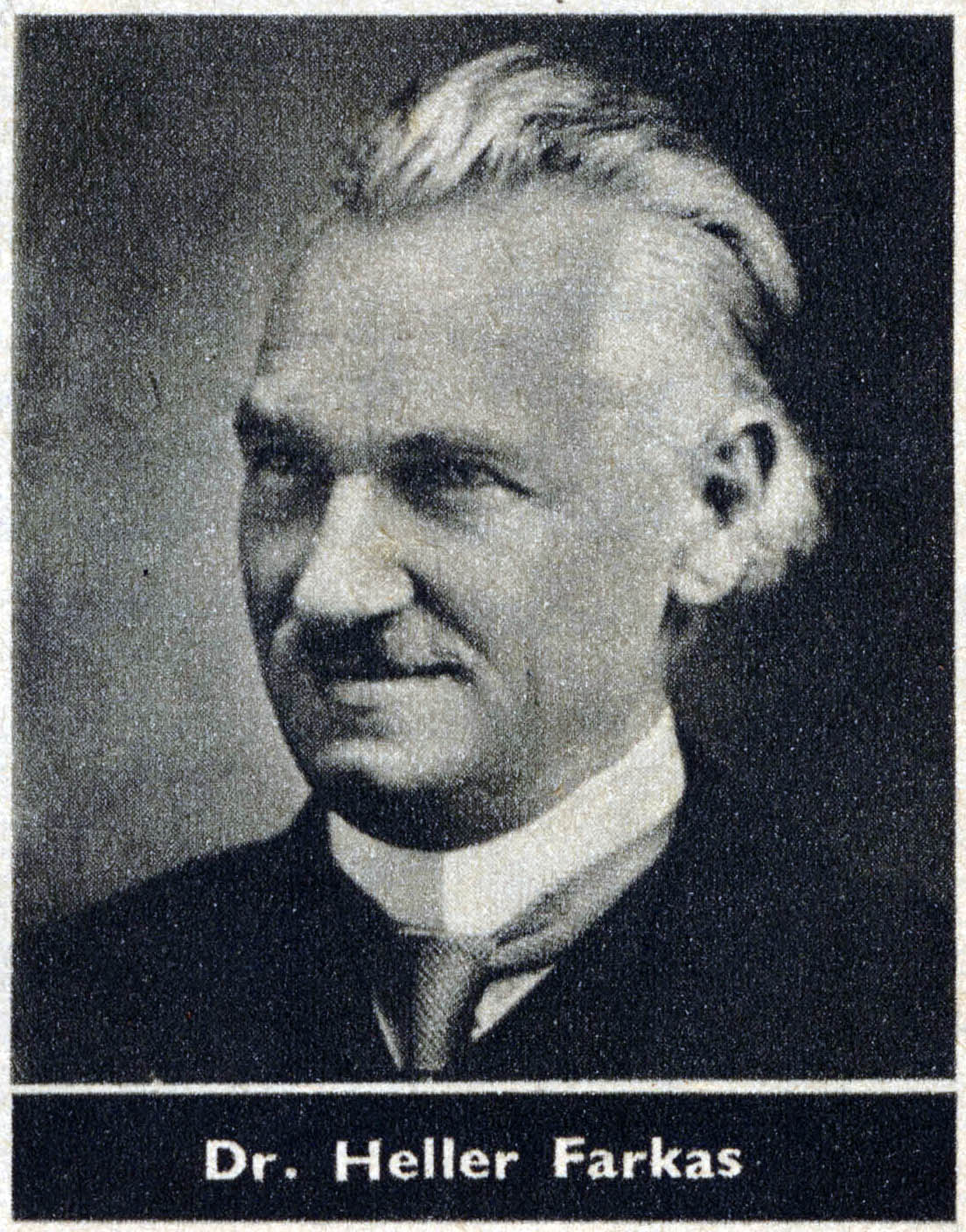
- Born: 9 May 1877; Budapest, Kingdom of Hungary
- Died: 29 September 1955 (aged 78); Budapest
- Citizenship: Hungarian
- Spouse: Paula Klasz (1891–1971)

Academic background
- Education: Budapest University of Technology and Economics
- Influences: Imre Hajnik, Győző Concha, Béla Földes, Lajos Láng,

Academic work
- Discipline: Economist, Statistician
- Institutions: Budapest University of Technology and Economics
- Notable students: Kálmán Kádas, Béla Krekó
- Awards: Corvin Wreath (1930)
- Memorials: Heller Wolf College. Faculty of Law and Political Science. Heller Farkas Institute of Economics. In Farkasréti cemetery located in his tomb. National Memorial and Reverence Committee it was declared protected in 2004.

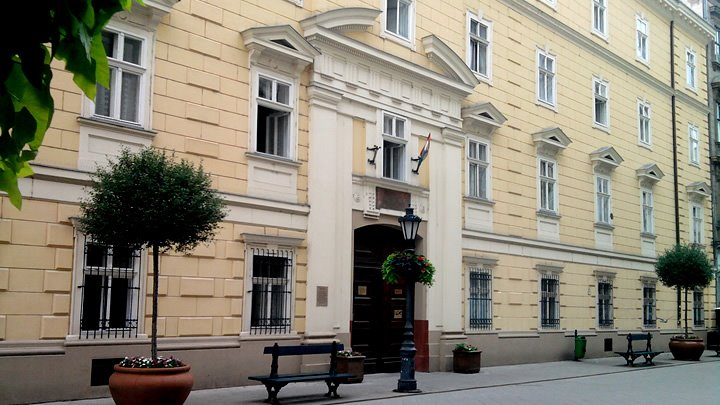
Heller Farkas Vocational College building on Váci utca, Budapest, Váci utca 47. in 2011

Farkas Heller (Budapest, 9 May 1877 – Budapest, 29 September 1955) was a Hungarian Economist, author and professor, member of the Hungarian Academy of Sciences.

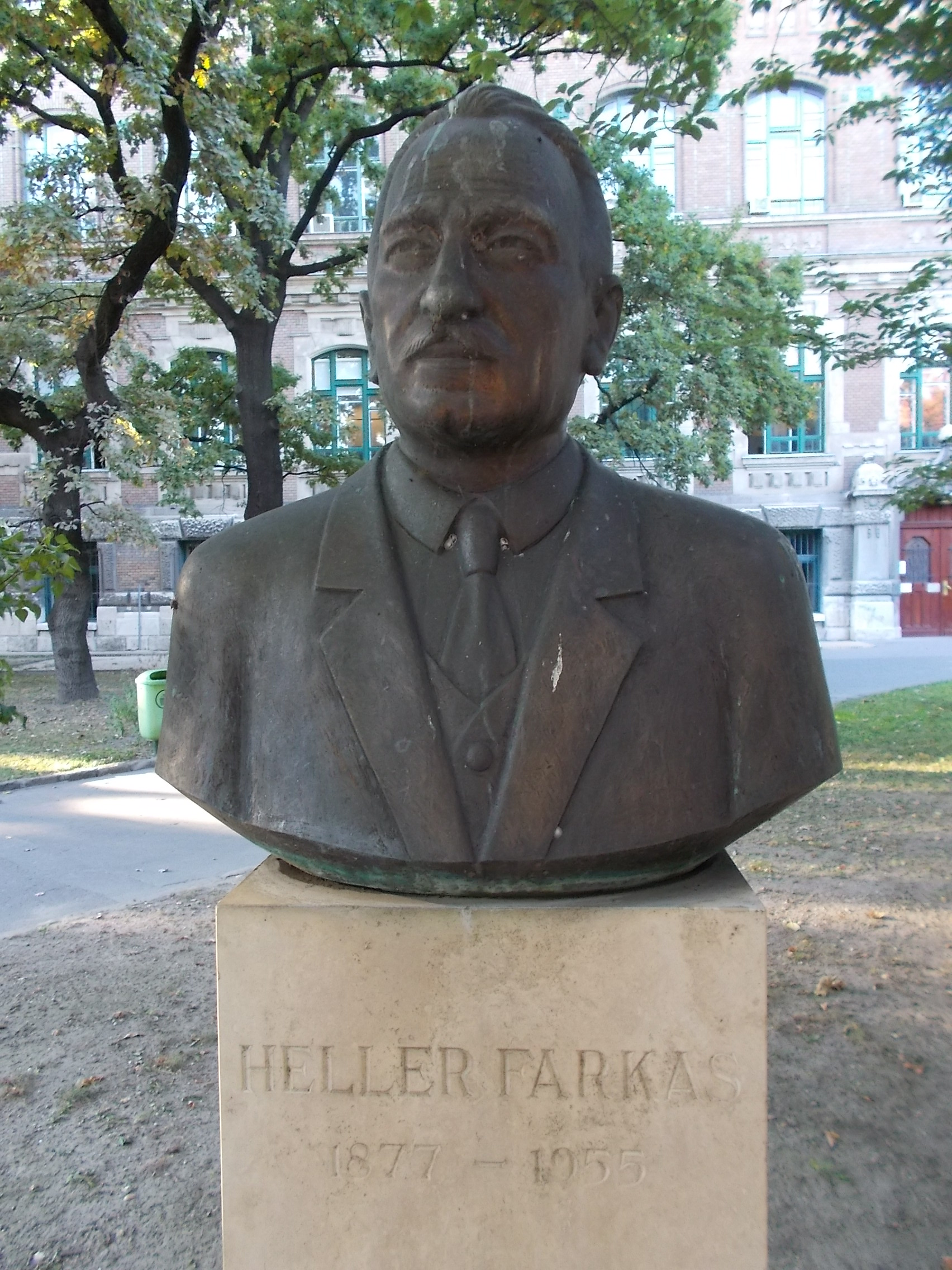
Bust of Farkas Heller by Emil Eory at the Budapest University of Technology and Economics - Lágymányos neighborhood, Budapest District XI. Hungary

== Biography ==
His father, hu:Heller Ágost (1843–1902) Hungarian physicist, historian of science, member of the Hungarian Academy of Sciences, mother knight bleybach Bolberitz Georgina (1854–1920). Her little brother dr. hu:Heller Erik (1880–1958) lawyer, university professor whose wife was a nobleman Irén Kiss (1887–1971). His wife, Paula Klasz (1891–1971), dr. She was the daughter of Pál Klasz, Secretary of the Ministry of the Interior

== Career ==
He began his career at the Budapest Chamber of Commerce and Industry, then in 1902 he joined the Ministry of Agriculture. In 1907 he was a private teacher of trade and industrial policy at the Budapest University of Technology and Economics in Budapest, and then in 1914 the same economics and finance. he became a teacher. His scholarly works have been published in series, his work entitled "Economics" has been awarded the Strókay Prize by the Hungarian Academy of Sciences, and his work has even been published in Leipzig in German. He became a corresponding member (1921), then a member (1934) of the Hungarian Academy of Sciences. In 1949 he was expelled from the Hungarian Academy of Sciences. He was rehabilitated in 1989, Posthumous promotion regained his academic membership. „Heller Farkas has been significant in three areas: processing the development of economic theory, developing theoretical and applied economics (economic policy), and finance. After the liberation, all three areas had excellent and internationally recognized cultivators, but there was no researcher alone who could cultivate all three areas comprehensively. In his research and teaching work, Heller highlighted the following theoretical areas of economics: value, price, income distribution, money, foreign trade, and economic fluctuations. In the field of economic policy, he dealt with, inter alia, organizational, credit, trade, currency, transport and social policies.

=== Leadership ===
1920–1929 Dean of the Faculty of Economics et the Budapest University of Technology and Economics
1945–1946 In the academic year he was the rector of Budapest University of Technology and Economics

== Society memberships ==
- 1917–1948. He was the editor of the Economic Review
- 1922–1948. He is a member of the Hungarian Statistical Society
- 1926–1948. Member of the Board of the Hungarian Statistical Society
- 1934–1948. Chairman of the National Economy Committee of the Hungarian Academy of Sciences
- 1935–1948. Member of the National Council for Higher Education

== Notable works ==
- The theory of marginal benefit. (in Hungarian) Bp., Politzer Zs. és fia. (The project awarded the Ullmann Prize by the Hungarian Academy of Sciences) 1904.
- Die Grundprobleme der theoretischen Volkswirtschaftslehre (The basic problems of theoretical economics) (in German). Leipzig, 1921.
- Economics. Theoretical economics. I. Applied economics II. (in Hungarian) Németh J. K. Bp., 1919. (2. Edition 1921. 3. Ed. 1925. 4. Ed. 1942. 5.Ed. 1945. 6. Ed. 1988.)
- Monetary policy. (in Hungarian) Németh J. K., Bp., 1920.
- Social policy. (in Hungarian) Németh J. K., Bp., 1920.
- Finance. Németh J. K., Bp., 1921. (2. Edition 1943.)
- Die Entwicklung der Grundprobleme der volkswirtschaftlichen Theorie. (Development of the basic problems of economic theory.) (in German). Quelle und Meyer, Leipzig, 1921. (2. Edition 1924. 3. Ed. 1928. 4. Ed. 1931.
- Nationalökonomie. Theorie und Geschichte. Meyer’s Wörterbuch (Economic lexicon) (in German). Halberstadt, Meyer, 1925. (2. Edition 1926. 3. Ed. 1930. Ed. 1933)
- Business cycle theory and business cycle research. (in Hungarian) Közgazdasági Szemle 1927.
- Theoretische Volkswirtschaftstlehre. (Theoretical economics.) (in German). 1. Band. Quelle und Meyer, Leipzig, 1927.
- Economic Lexicon. (in Hungarian) Grill, Bp., 1937.
- Diccionario de economia politica. (Economic Lexicon) (In Spanish) Editorial Labor S. A. Barcelona, 1937. (2. Edition 1941. 3. Ed. 1946. 4. Ed. 1950. 5. Ed. 1965. 6. Ed. 1969. Introduction Fabian Estape)
- Business mind and public interest. (in Hungarian) A Mérnöki Továbbképző Intézet. Egyetemi Nyomda Bp., 1943. (2. Edition 1982.
- History of economic theory. (in Hungarian) Gergely R., Bp., 1943. (2. Edition AULA 2001.)
