= Balázs Tóthmajor =

Hungarian politician

Member of the National Assembly
- Incumbent
- Assumed office 9 May 2026
- Preceded by: Bence Rétvári
- Constituency: Pest 4th

Personal details
- Born: 1986 or 1987 (age 38–39)
- Party: TISZA

Balázs Tóthmajor is a Hungarian politician who was elected member of the National Assembly in 2026. He previously worked as a financial analyst.
