= Kálmán Kádas =

Hungarian mechanical engineer

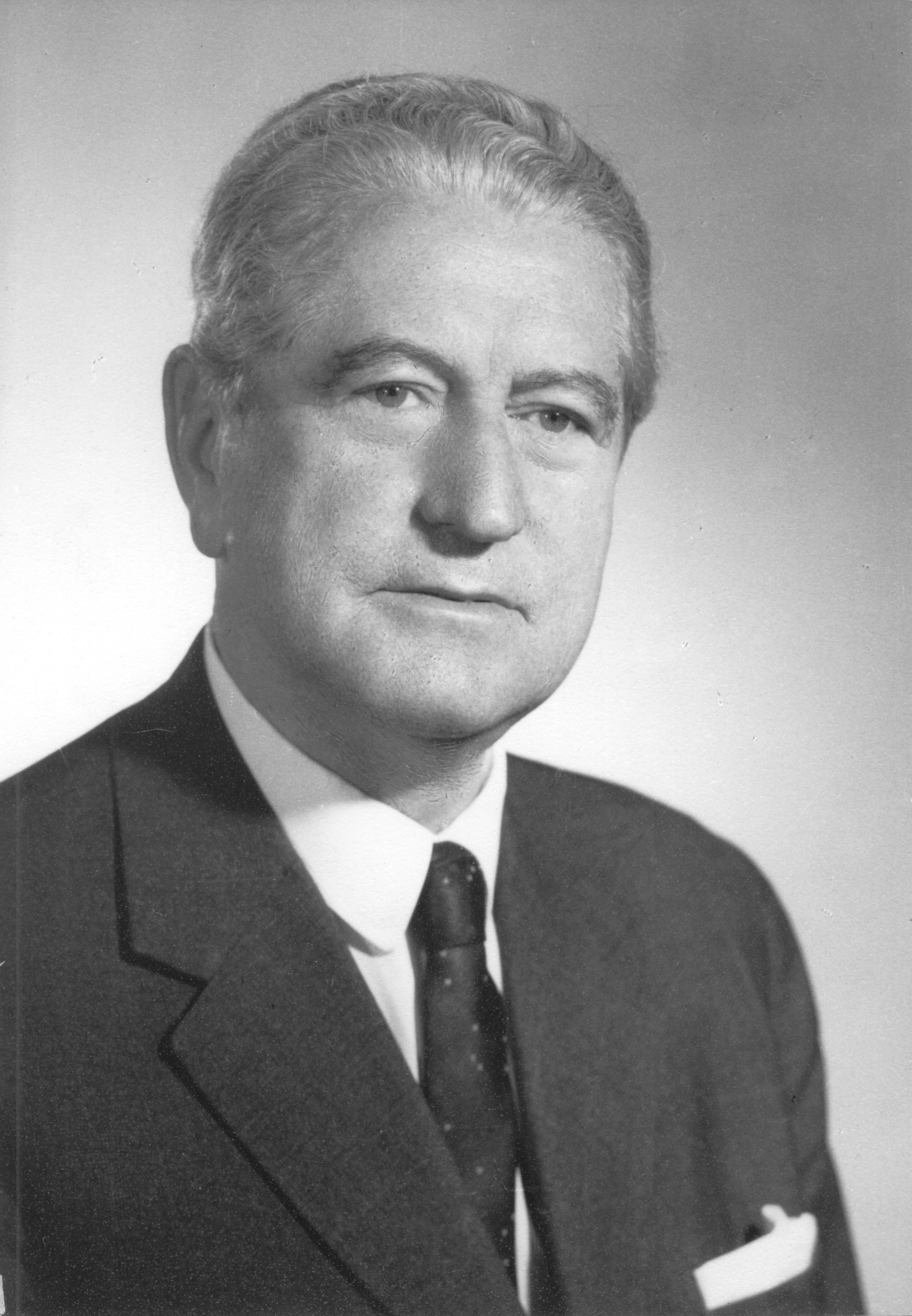
- Kálmán Kádas in 1956
- Born: 1908. February 7.; Kisoroszi, Kingdom of Hungary
- Died: March 17, 1985 (aged 76); Budapest
- Citizenship: Hungarian

Academic background
- Education: Budapest University of Technology and Economics
- Influences: Farkas Heller

Academic work
- Discipline: engineer, statistician, transport economics
- Institutions: deputy rector of the Budapest University of Technology and Economics, 1967–1970
- Notable students: Béla Sipos (economist)
- Awards: 1962 Honorary Doctor of the Friedrich List College of Transport in Dresden. 1970.

Kálmán Kádas (Kisoroszi, 1908 July 30 – Budapest, 1985 March 17) was a Hungarian engineer, economist, statistician, transport economics author and professor, co-worker of Farkas Heller, doctor of engineering (1974).

== Early life and career ==
His parents were Sándor Kádas and Gabriella Bentsik. He married in 1943, his wife was Emma Bartha (1908–1990) and they had two sons: István (1946) and Sándor (1948).

Kálmán Kádas completed his elementary schools in Kisoroszi, graduated from the Piarist High School in Vác in 1926, his class teacher was József Öveges. He obtained a degree in Budapest University of Technology and Economics mechanical engineering in Budapest in 1931, with a degree in economic engineering in 1932, and a doctorate in economics in 1936. He received his CSc degree (PhD equivalent) in 1961 at the Hungarian Academy of Sciences (HAS), "High-efficiency types of transport development. Based on his dissertation entitled Reasonable application and research of new technology in transport, he was awarded the title of Candidate of Technical Sciences.

He received the degree DsC of the HAS in 1974. The title of the doctoral dissertation: Some types of technical-economic contexts enhancing the macroeconomic efficiency of transport development and the possibilities of their systematic utilization.

== Positions ==
- 1933–1948 at the Department of National Economy and Finance of the Technical University (from 1934 to 1948 Royal Hungarian Nádor József University of Technology and Economics) under Farkas Heller, from 1933 as an assistant lecturer, from 1936 as lecturer, from 1943 to 1948 as a university private professor at the department headed by Farkas Heller until the termination of the department.
- 1938–1949 industrial economics expert of the Central Statistical Office
- 1949–1955 employee of the Ministry of Transport and Post (KPM)
- 1955–1976 professor, head of the Department of Transportation Economics at the Technical University of Construction and Transport
- 1957–1964 dean of the Faculty of Transportation Engineering of the Budapest University of Technology and Economics
- 1967–1970 deputy rector of the Budapest University of Technology and Economics

== Research ==
His diverse work in economics covered industrial economics, transport economics, transport statistics, econometrics, and prognostics. After 1945 he was engaged in industrial and transport economics research.

== Notable works ==
Sources:

- "Statistical analysis of human labor productivity in the Hungarian manufacturing industry". (in Hungarian); Magyar Statisztikai Szemle, 1944. July–August
- Economic issues in transport. University textbook. (in Hungarian); Tankönyvkiadó. Bp., 1958
- Major economic issues in transport. Engineering manual. (in Hungarian); Bp., 1961
- Fazekas Ferenc-Kádas Kálmán. Applications of mathematical methods in the transport repair industry. (in Hungarian); Mérnöki Továbbképző Intézet. Bp., 1966
- Acta Oeconomica. 4. 1969 / 1. REVIEWS. Kádas Kálmán: 8th European congress of the regional Science Association
- Statistics. 1–2. (in Hungarian); Tankönyvkiadó. Bp., 1966; 2nd, extended edition, 1972
- Kádas, Kálmán (1968). "Approximate Solutions of the Macroeconomic Transport Problem and Modelling of the Economic Strategy in Transport". Periodica Polytechnica Mechanical Engineering. 12 (2): 159–166. ISSN 1587-379X.
- Business Economics. (in Hungarian); Tankönyvkiadó. Bp., 1968; 2nd, extended edition, 1971
- Technisch-ökonomische Steuerung von Verkehrsabläufen mit Hilfe kybernetischer Systeme. (in German); Göttingen, 1970
- Transport Economics. (in Hungarian); university textbook, Tankönyvkiadó. Bp., 1972; 2nd edition, 1976

== Society memberships ==
1945–1951 general secretary of the Hungarian Economic Society
1959–1976 vice president of the Hungarian Economic Association
1948–1951 secretary of the Hungarian Statistical Society
1963–1985 member of the International Statistical Institute in The Hague
1969–1985 member of the Environment and Planning editorial board in London
1970–1985 member of the editorial board of Regional and Urban Economics in Amsterdam
1972–1985 elected member of the Österreichische Verkehrswissenschaftliche Gesellschaft in Vienna

== Sources ==
- Acta Oeconomica 5. 1970 / 4. REVIEWS The New Editorial Board of Acta Oeconomic. Kálmán Kádas
- Magyar életrajzi lexikon /K/ Kádas Kálmán (in Hungarian)
- Közlekedéstudományi Szemle. 1985/4. Kálmán Kádas
- Magyar Életrajzi Lexikon 1994. Kádas Kálmán
- Gazdaság. 1970. 9. Kádas Kálmán
- Névpont. 2013. Kálmán Kádas
- Statisztikai Szemle. 1985/8. Kálmán Kádas
- Magyar Életrajzi Lexikon. 1000–1990. Kálmán Kádas
- Kozák Péter. Kálmán Kádas
- KSH. 2018. Kálmán Kádas
- Műegyetemi évfordulók 2008-ban. Kálmán Kádas
