= Lupa Island (Hungary) =

Island in the Danube river, Hungary

Native name: Lupa-sziget
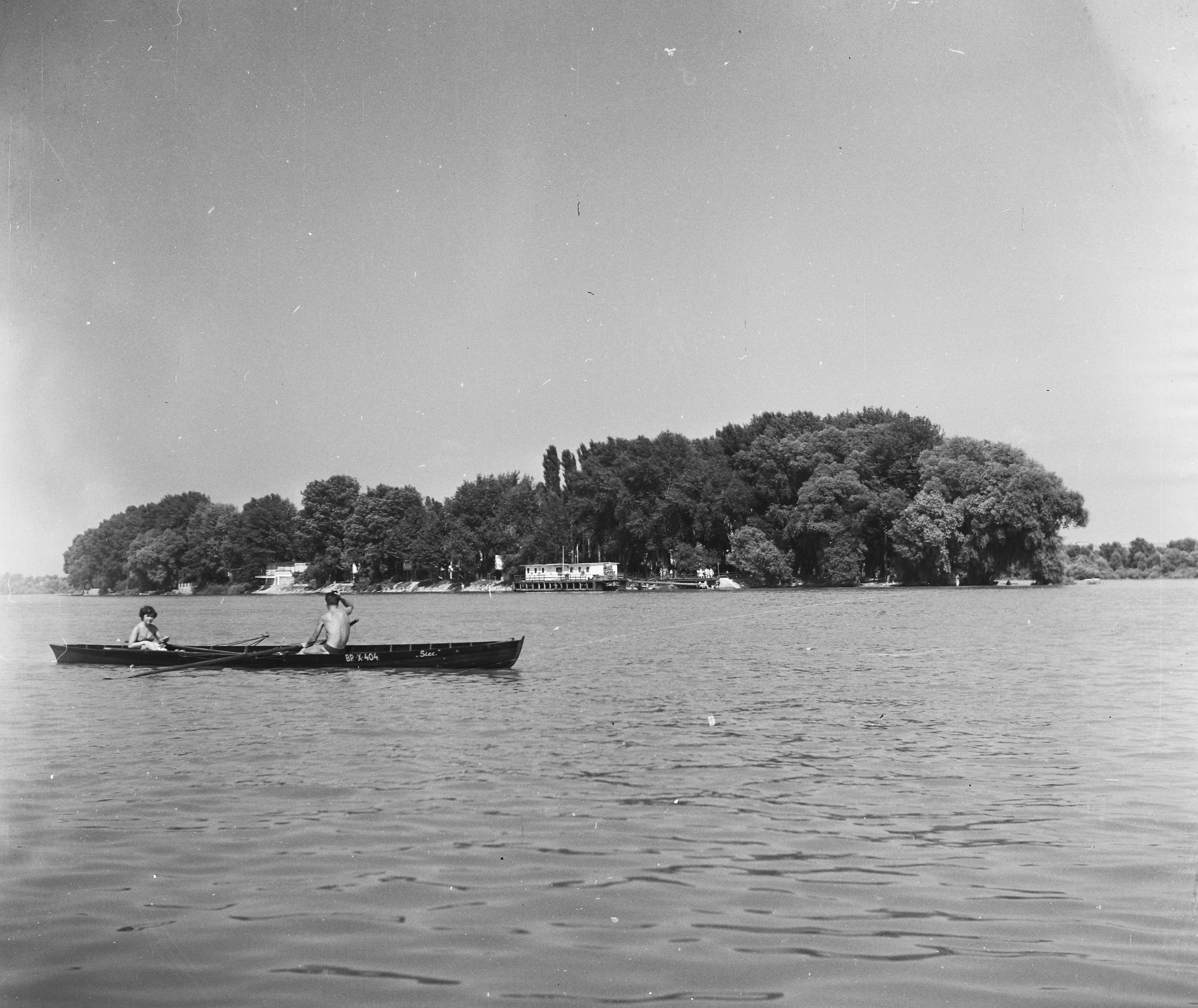
- Lupa Island in 1955

- Location within Hungary

Geography
- Location: Danube River
- Coordinates: 47°36′58.1″N 19°05′9.4″E

Administration
- Hungary

Lupa Island (Hungarian: Lupa-sziget) is an island on the Danube in Hungary. It is located on the Szentendre branch of the Danube, to the west of the much larger Szentendre Island and 14 kilometres (8.7 mi) to the north of the capital Budapest. It forms part of the town of Budakalász, in Szentendre District of Pest County.

The island is inhabited, and there a number of houses on it. It is only accessible by boat.
