= Szentendre District =

Coordinates: 47.6667°N 19.0833°E

Szentendre District Szentendrei járás
- Districts of Hungary
- Coat of arms

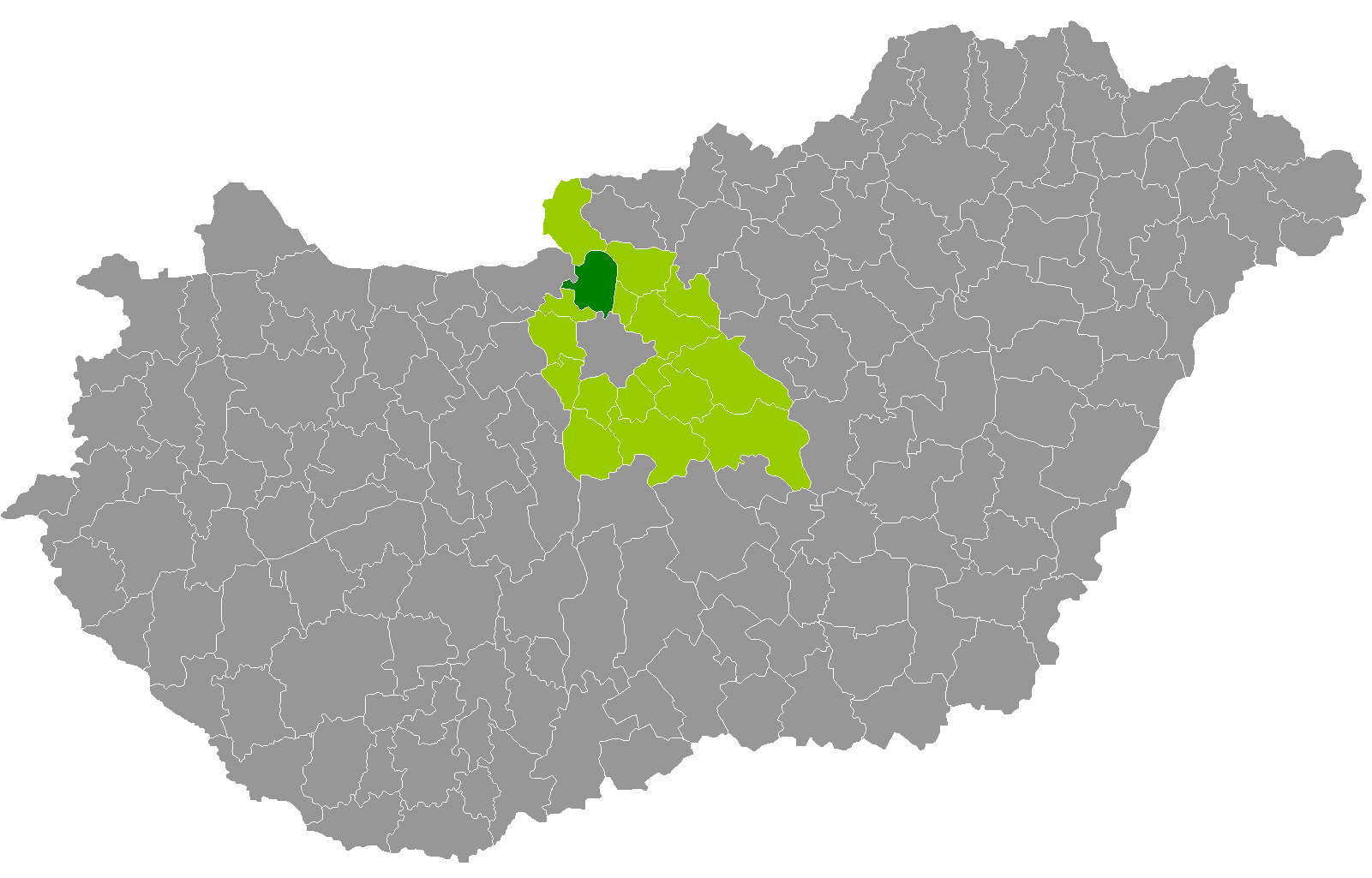
- Szentendre District within Hungary and Pest County.
- Country: Hungary
- County: Pest
- District seat: Szentendre

Area
  - Total: 326.58 km^{2} (126.09 sq mi)
  - Rank: 10th in Pest

Population (2011 census)
  - Total: 77,802
  - Rank: 7th in Pest
  - Density: 238/km^{2} (620/sq mi)

Szentendre (Hungarian: Szentendrei járás) is a district in north-western part of Pest County. Szentendre is also the name of the town where the district seat is found. The district is located in the Central Hungary Statistical Region.

== Geography ==
Szentendre District borders with Szob District to the north, Vác District and Dunakeszi District to the east, Budapest to the south, Pilisvörösvár District to the southwest, Esztergom District (Komárom-Esztergom County) to the west. The district includes the whole of Szentendre Island in the Danube. The number of the inhabited places in Szentendre District is 13.

== Municipalities ==
The district has 4 towns, 1 large village and 8 villages. (ordered by population, as of 1 January 2013)

- **Budakalász** (10,450)
- Csobánka (3,178)
- Dunabogdány (3,113)
- Kisoroszi (946)
- Leányfalu (3,483)
- Pilisszentkereszt (2,193)
- Pilisszentlászló (1,193)
- Pócsmegyer (1,919)
- **Pomáz** (16,445)
- **Szentendre** (25,274) – district seat
- Szigetmonostor (2,235)
- Tahitótfalu (5,496)
- **Visegrád** (1,795)

The bolded municipalities are cities, italics municipality is large village.

== Demographics ==
Religion in Szentendre District (2011 census)
1. Catholic Church (36.4%)
2. Greek Catholicism (0.90%)
3. Calvinism (11.9%)
4. Lutheranism (1.20%)
5. Orthodoxy (0.50%)
6. Judaism (0.20%)
7. Other religions (2.20%)
8. Non-religious (16.5%)
9. Atheists (2.10%)
10. Undeclared (28.1%)

In 2011, it had a population of 77,802 and the population density was 238/km^{2}.

Year	County population	Change
2011	77,802	n/a

=== Ethnicity ===
Besides the Hungarian majority, the main minorities are the German (approx. 2,500), Slovak (1,100), Roma (1,000), Serb (450), Romanian (300), Russian and Polish (150), Croat (100).

Total population (2011 census): 77,802
Ethnic groups (2011 census): Identified themselves: 75,440 persons:

- Hungarians: 68,057 (90.21%)
- Germans: 2,585 (3.43%)
- Slovaks: 1,093 (1.45%)
- Gypsies: 1,030 (1.36%)
- Others and indefinable: 2,675 (3.55%)

Approx. 2,500 persons in Szentendre District did not declare their ethnic group at the 2011 census.

=== Religion ===
Religious adherence in the county according to 2011 census:

- Catholic – 29,034 (Roman Catholic – 28,351; Greek Catholic – 665);
- Reformed – 9,305;
- Evangelical – 959;
- Orthodox – 354;
- Judaism – 128;
- other religions – 1,744;
- Non-religious – 12,811;
- Atheism – 1,607;
- Undeclared – 21,860.

== Gallery ==
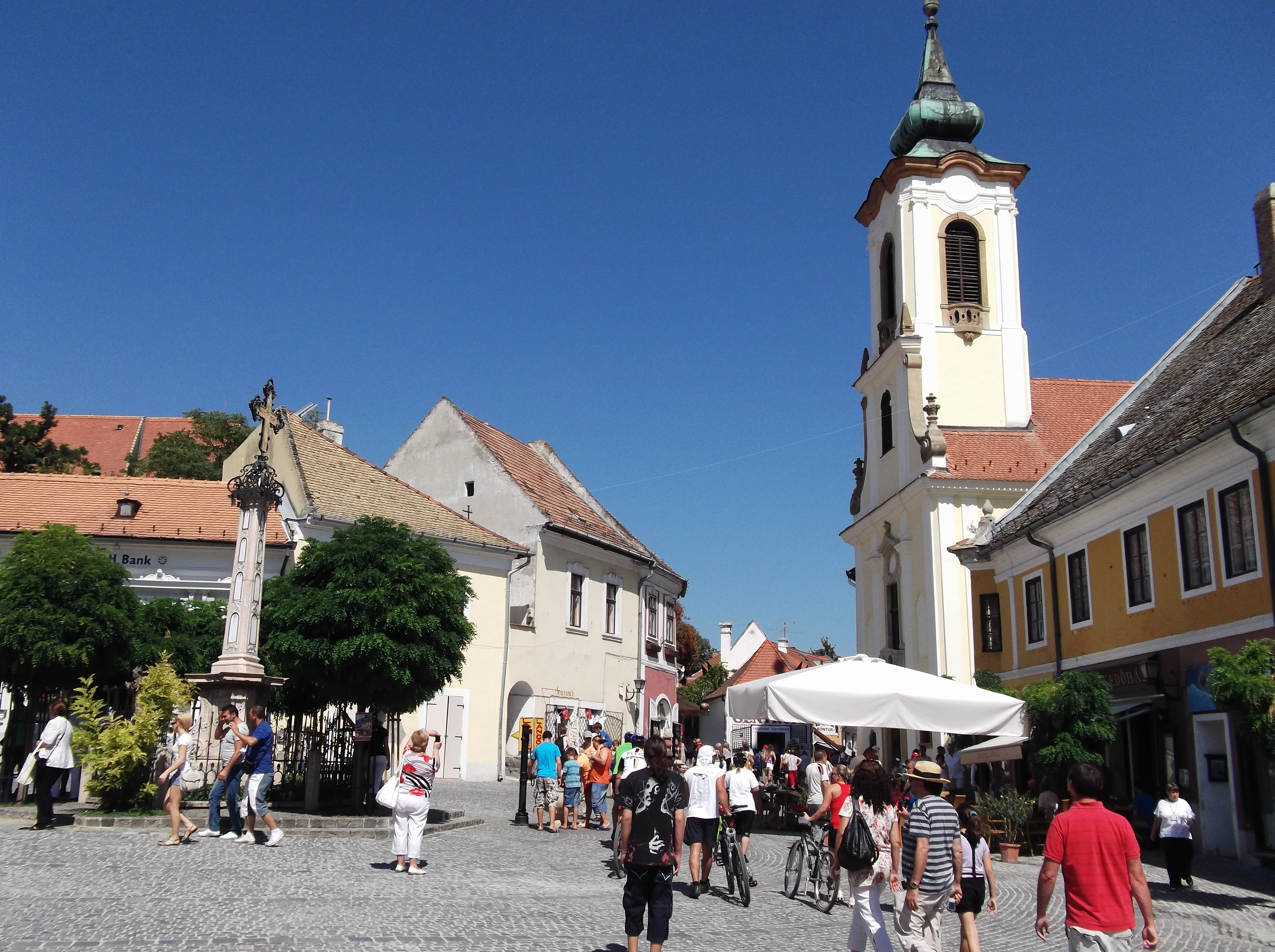
Downtown of Szentendre

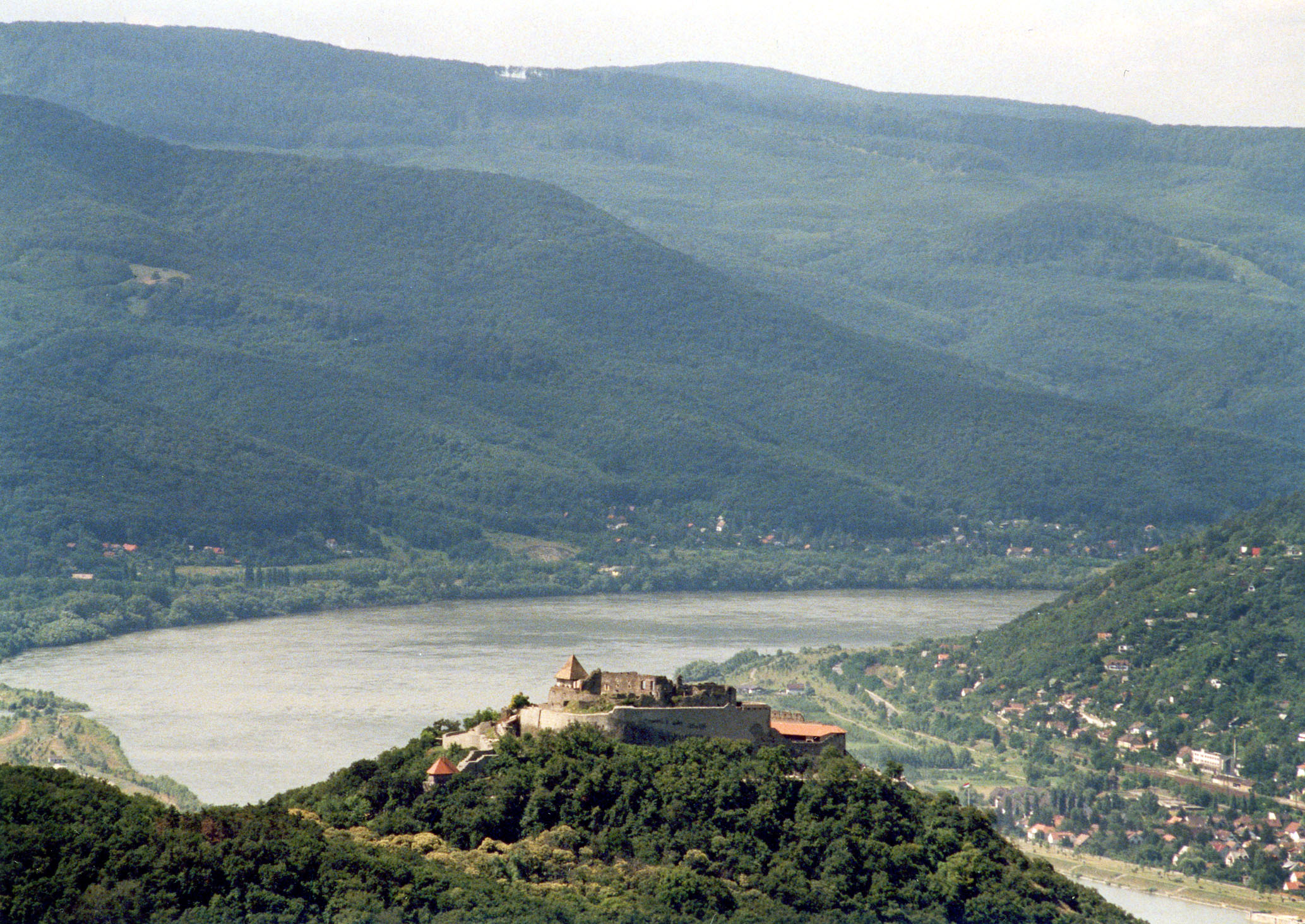
Visegrád Castle

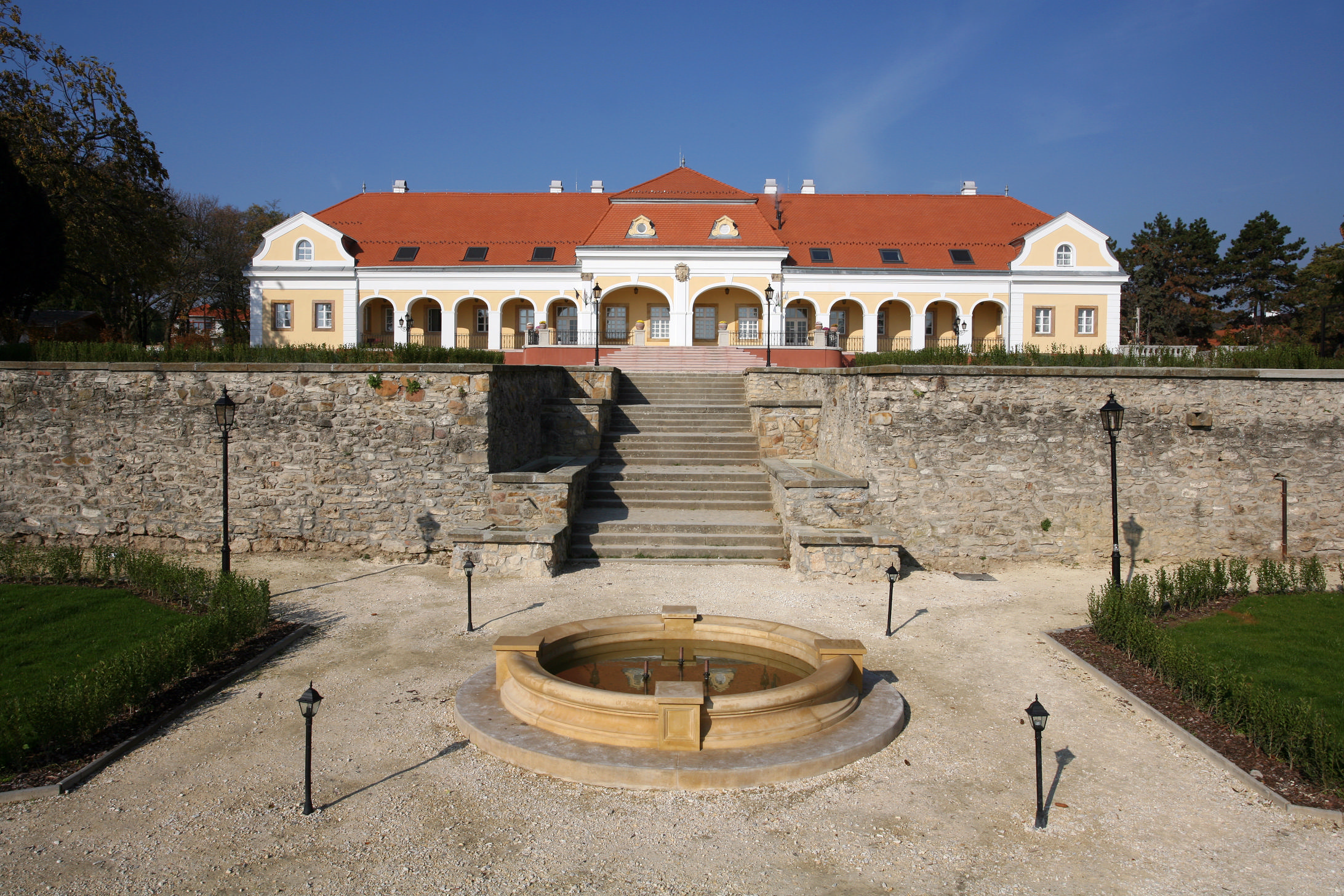
Teleki–Wattay Mansion in Pomáz

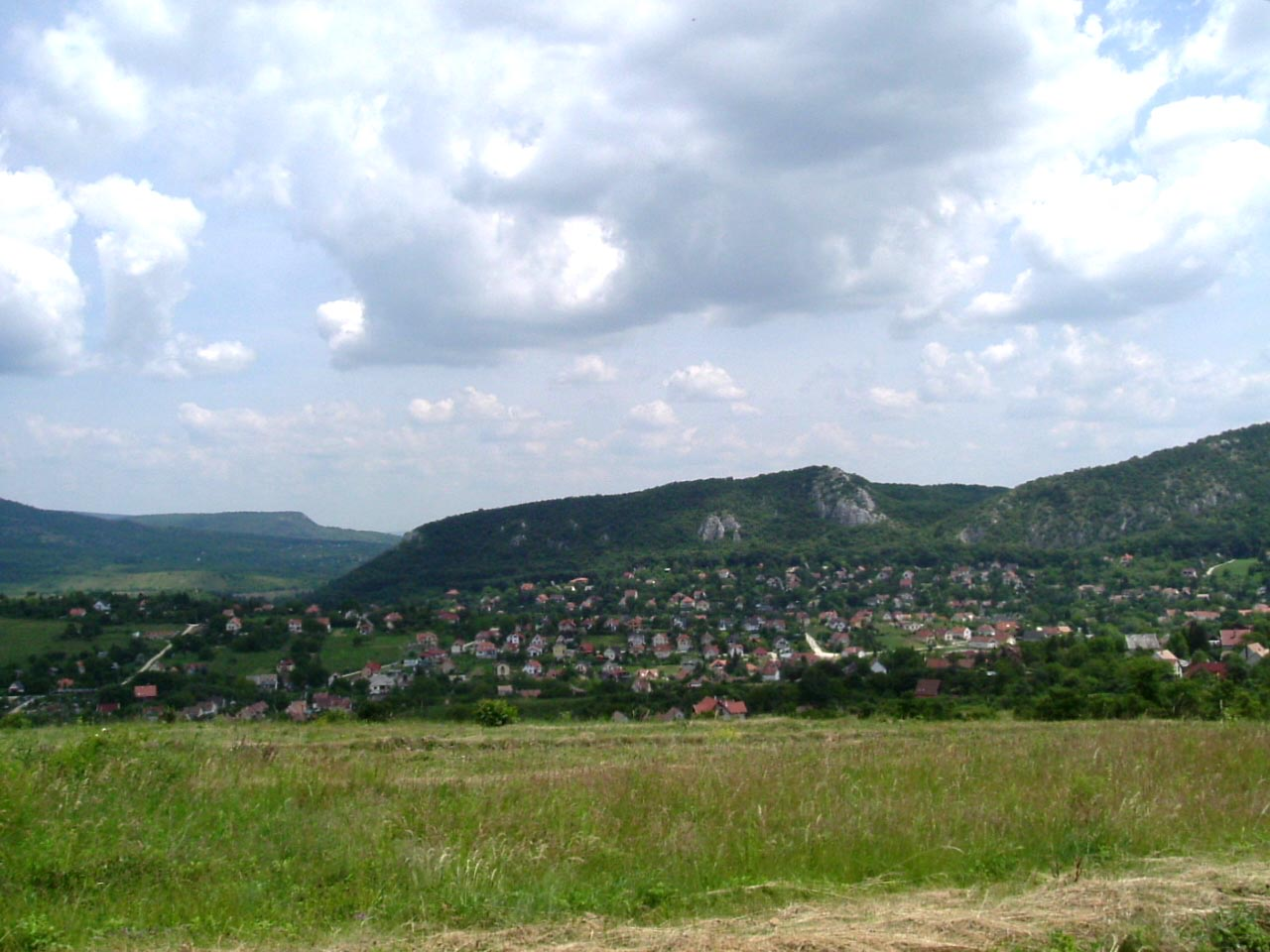
Panorama of Csobánka

== See also ==
- List of cities and towns in Hungary
