= Leányfalu =

- Large village
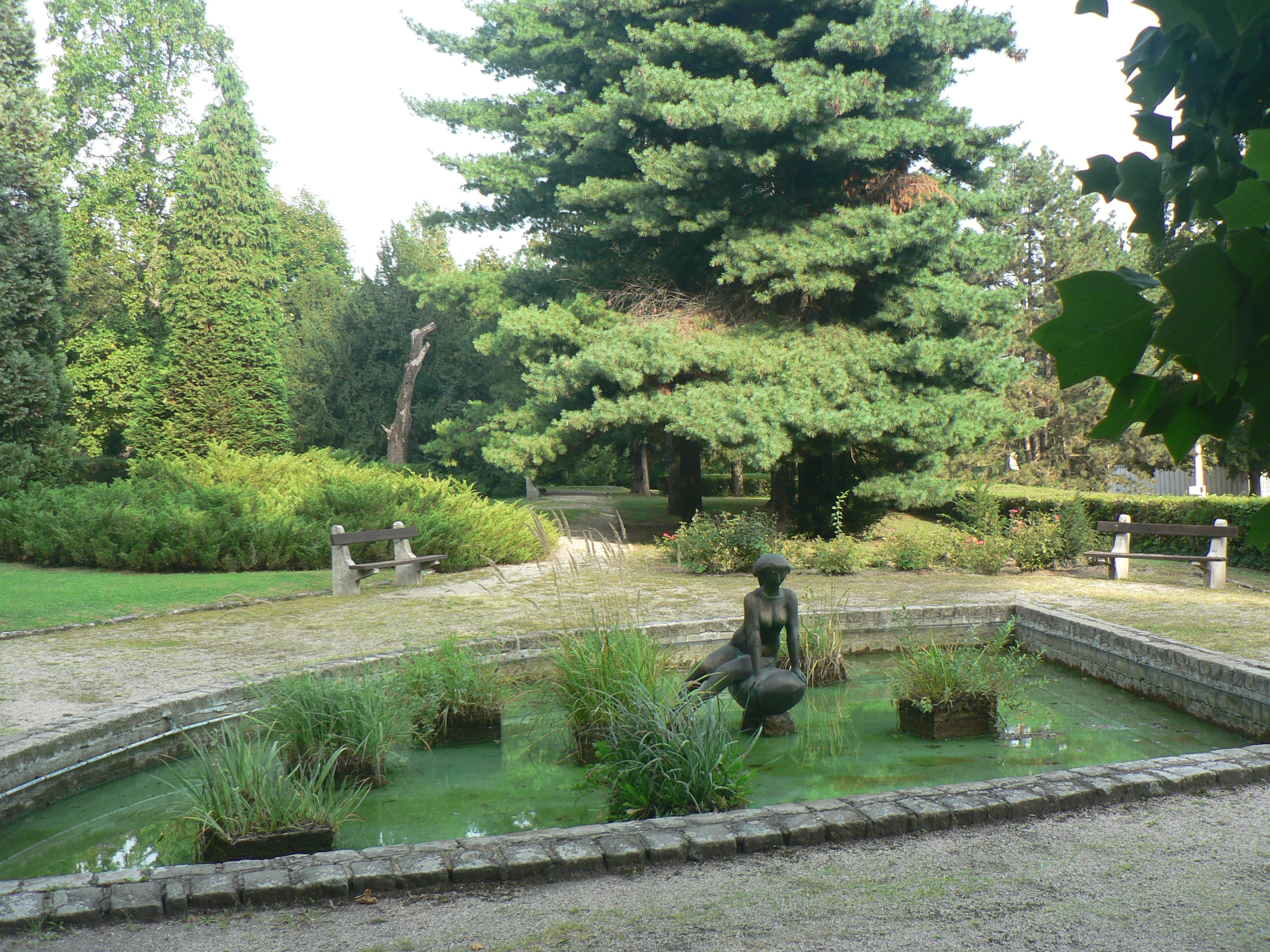

- Flag Coat of arms

- Location of Leányfalu
- Coordinates: 47°43′36″N 19°5′22″E
- Country: Hungary
- Region: Central Hungary
- County: Pest
- District: Szentendre

Area
  - Total: 15.37 km^{2} (5.93 sq mi)

Population (1 January 2026)
  - Total: 4,096
  - Density: 266.5/km^{2} (690.2/sq mi)
- Time zone: UTC+1 (CET)
  - Summer (DST): UTC+2 (CEST)
- Postal code: 2016
- Area code: (+36) 26
- Website: www.leanyfalu.hu

Leányfalu is a riverside village in Pest county, Budapest metropolitan area, Hungary. It is just north of Szentendre located at 47°43′36″N 19°5′22″E. Located between the branch of the Little Danube (Kis-Duna) and the spurs of the Visegrád Mountains, Leányfalu stretches some 5 kilometres in length. It was declared a holiday resort in 1936 and became an independent municipality in 1949.

To visit Leányfalu from Budapest, take the local Volán buses on the Budapest Újpest-Városkapu – Tahitótfalu – Visegrád – Esztergom line, which leaves around one to three times per hour. By automobile, take route 11 passing through Szentendre.

== Trivia ==
- Some of the best Hungarian writers, artists, and musicians have retreated to Leányfalu.
- The village received media attention in the Ciaran Tobin extradition case.

== Gallery ==
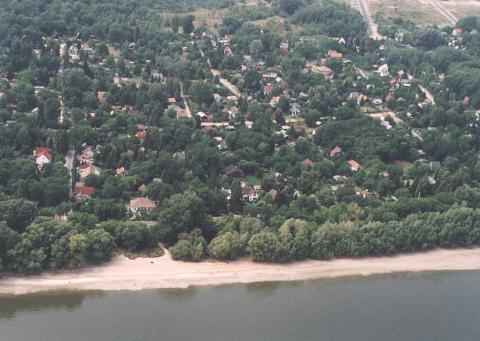

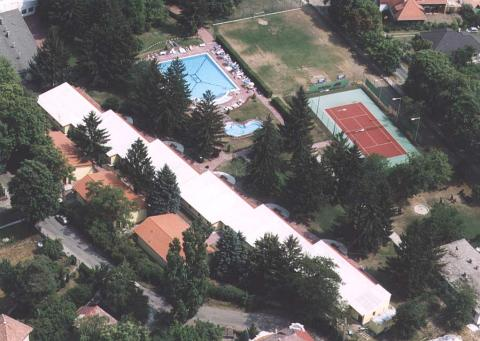

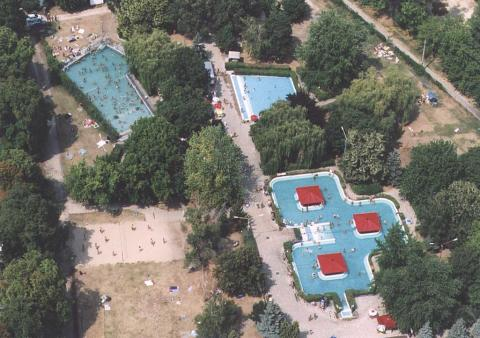
