= Ciarán Tobin extradition case =

Requests to extradite criminal from Ireland to Hungary

The Ciarán Tobin extradition case concerns requests for the extradition of Irish businessman Francis Ciarán Tobin from Ireland to Hungary. Tobin is the subject of a European Arrest Warrant issued by the Hungarian authorities after he was found guilty of causing serious bodily harm by negligent driving when his car went out of control killing two Hungarian children in the village of Leányfalu near Budapest in April 2000. He was tried in his absence after he failed to return from Ireland for his trial.

After joining the European Union in 2004, Hungary issued a European Arrest Warrant for Tobin's forcible surrender to Hungary to serve his prison sentence. The Irish Supreme Court has refused to extradite Tobin on two separate occasions.

Twelve years after the case, Irish Prime Minister Enda Kenny expressed regret but confirmed that the case is officially closed.

In January 2014 Tobin started to serve his time in prison.

== Facts ==
Ciarán Tobin is an Irish citizen. In 2000 he was working as a senior manager of Irish Life and Permanent Hungary, having been seconded there. On 9 April 2000, he was driving towards Budapest through the village of Leányfalu. His speed was established as at least 70 km/h (43 mph) in a 50 km/h (31 mph) zone. According to Tobin, he was in the process of changing lanes when his car became unresponsive, failed to straighten out into the rightmost lane and mounted the pavement. On mounting the pavement the car caused the immediate deaths of two children, 2-year-old Petra Zoltai who was sitting in a pram, and her brother 5-year-old Márton Zoltai.

== Trial and departure from Hungary ==
In the immediate aftermath of the accident, Tobin was placed under formal investigation by the Hungarian police and was taken to a police station to be interviewed. Tobin was not acquainted with any Hungarian lawyers but knew a young Hungarian woman Kata Soós whose father Tibor Soós was a lawyer. In the interviews which followed Ms. Soós was asked by the police to act as an interpreter in the absence of anyone else present who could speak both English and Hungarian.

Tobin was subsequently charged with negligent driving causing serious bodily harm and in accordance with Hungarian law chose not to attend court but was represented throughout the criminal proceedings by his lawyers. When Tobin was first interviewed by the police they had asked him to present his passport which they retained. In the autumn of 2000 he requested the return of his passport so that he could visit Ireland for a wedding and to see his family. This request was granted but he was not asked to return his passport on his return on 9 October 2000. On 30 October 2000 Tobin returned to Ireland permanently, his period of secondment to Irish Life Hungary having come to an end.

Tobin's trial took place in Hungary on 7 May 2002 in Tobin's absence albeit in the presence of lawyers acting on Tobin's behalf. Statements made by Tobin after his arrest were ruled to be inadmissible on the basis that they had been translated by his lawyer's daughter. His trial took place under section 187 of the Hungarian criminal code which provides that:

(1) A person who causes grievous bodily harm to another person or persons by violating the rules of public road traffic, by negligence, commits a misdemeanour, and shall be punishable with imprisonment of up to one year, labour in the public interest, or fine.

(2) The punishment shall be

a) imprisonment of up to three years, if the crime causes enduring handicap, serious health injury or mass catastrophe,

b) imprisonment between one to five years, if the crime causes death,

c) imprisonment from two years to eight years, if the crime causes the death of more than two persons or a fatal mass catastrophe.

He was convicted and sentenced to three years in prison. On appeal his sentence was amended to allow for the possibility of parole after 18 months.

== Tobin 1 ==
Meanwhile, Hungary joined the European Union on 1 May 2004, and transposed the European Arrest Warrant framework decision into their national law. Hungary requested the surrender of Tobin by issuing a European Arrest Warrant. However, Justice Michael Peart of the Irish High Court refused the surrender on the basis that Tobin had not "fled" Hungary as required by the Irish legislation which implemented the framework decision, since he left Hungary with the consent of the Hungarian authorities. This decision was later upheld by the Irish Supreme Court. The Irish authorities also refused the Hungarian request to make Tobin serve his time in an Irish prison, an option within the EAW framework decision but never implemented in Ireland.

Hungary, on the other hand, strongly disagreed with this interpretation of the EAW law and the word "flee". Hungary argued that anyone not returning to serve his or her sentence is fleeing from justice. Hungary kept the warrant in effect as the Irish decision has no bearing for other EU members. Hungary also explored other legal options, including turning to various EU fora, to enforce its court's decision.

== Tobin 2 ==
In 2009, Ireland amended its domestic EAW legislation to bring it into line with the EAW framework decision by removing the requirement that, in conviction cases, a person the subject of an EAW had "fled" the issuing country. An amendment which came into force on 29 August 2009. On 17 September 2010, Hungary issued a new European Arrest Warrant seeking Tobin's arrest and surrender. Tobin was arrested on 10 November 2009 and his surrender was ordered on 11 February 2011 by Justice Peart, the same High Court judge who had previously refused the surrender.

However, Tobin was again successful in gaining the leave of the High Court to appeal its decision. Notwithstanding this Ciaran Tobin voluntarily entered custody in Ireland on 9 November 2011 on the basis that any time spent in prison in Ireland will be deducted from any time in prison that he might ultimately spend in Hungary.

Tobin won the appeal against surrender on 19 June 2012 when the Supreme Court over-ruled the High Court on a three to two majority.

== In prison ==
On 14 January 2014 Tobin voluntarily returned to Hungary to begin his prison sentence in a Hungarian jail. As a part of an agreement with the Hungarian Minister of Justice, Tibor Navracsics, on 17 January Tobin flew back to Ireland to serve the remainder of his time there. On 5 February 2014 Mr Tobin sent a letter to the family of the deceased children in which he expressed his regret and apologized. According to the lawyer of the family, the father sees it as a kind of closing of the case.
