= Bence Rétvári =

Hungarian politician

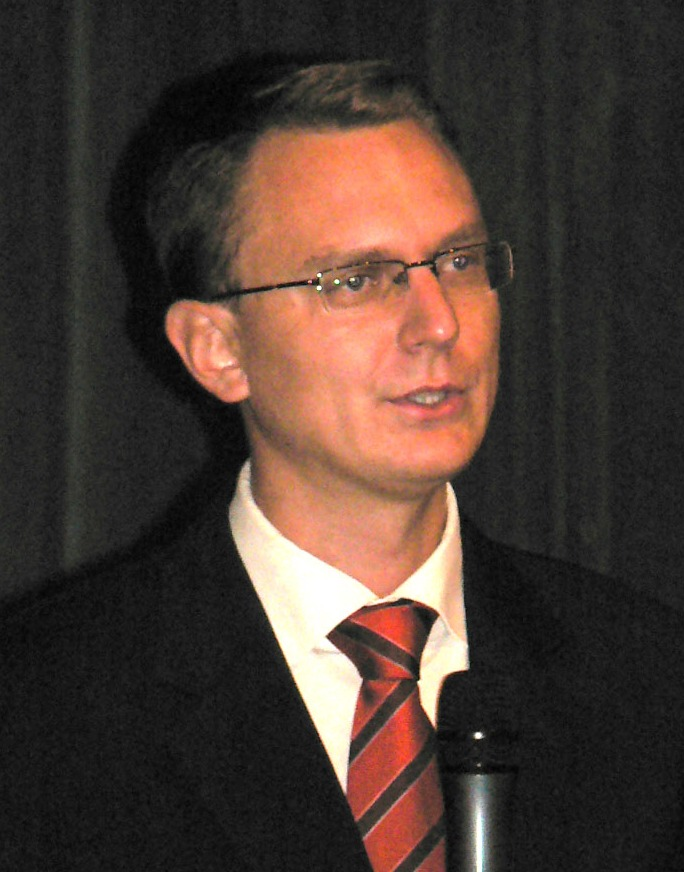

Member of the National Assembly
- Incumbent
- Assumed office 25 February 2008

Personal details
- Born: 10 December 1979 (age 46) Budapest, Hungary
- Party: Fidesz, KDNP
- Profession: jurist, politician

Dr. Bence Rétvári (born 10 December 1979) is a Hungarian jurist and politician, who served as Secretary of State for Public Administration and Justice between 2 June 2010 and 5 June 2014. He served as Deputy Minister and Parliamentary Secretary of State of the Ministry of Human Resources, then the Ministry of the Interior from 15 June 2014 to 12 May 2026. He also has been a Member of Parliament since 2008, leading the KDNP parliamentary group since 2026.

== Career ==
He became a member of the National Assembly (MP) for Újbuda (Budapest Constituency XV) on 25 February 2008, when replaced András Deák. He joined the Christian Democratic People's Party (KDNP) parliamentary group. He was a member of the Economic and Information Committee in 2008 and of the Parliamentary Committee for Environment between 2008 and 2010.

He was re-elected MP for Újbuda in the 2010 parliamentary election. He was elected via the Fidesz–KDNP national list in the 2014 parliamentary election. He was elected MP for Pest County 4th constituency (Vác) during the 2018 and 2022 parliamentary elections. Throughout these 16 years, Rétvári was the most active government MP in terms of the number of speeches, most of which he said as a parliamentary secretary of state.

Rétvári was defeated by Tisza candidate Renáta Szimon in Vác constituency during the 2026 Hungarian parliamentary election. Nevertheless, Rétvári became MP via the joint national list of Fidesz–KDNP. He was appointed leader of the KDNP parliamentary group. He also became a member of the parliament's Social Participation Committee.

National Assembly of Hungary
Preceded by István Simicskó	Leader of the KDNP parliamentary group 2026–	Incumbent
