= Béla Krekó =

Hungarian mathematician

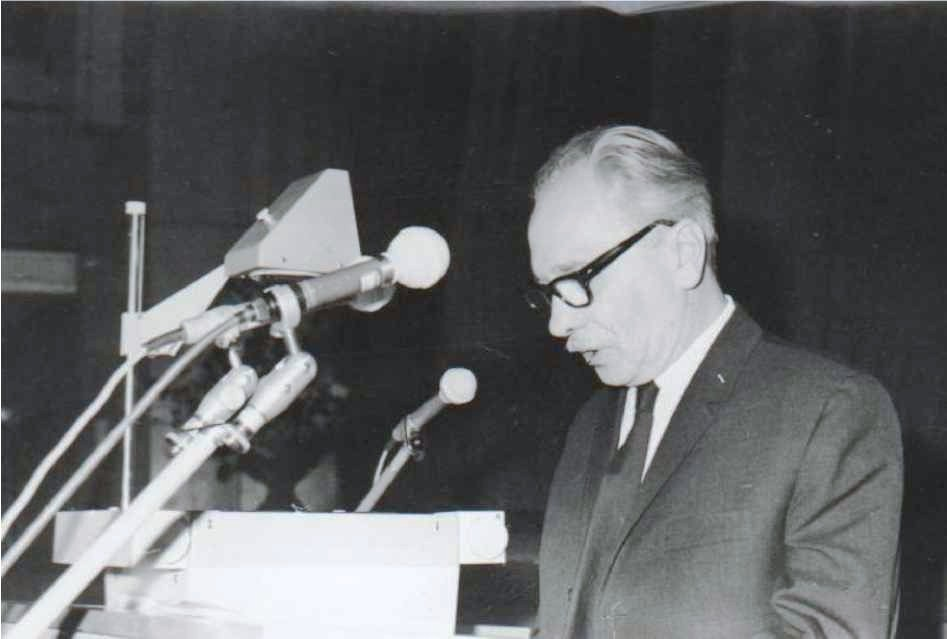
- Béla Krekó 1980.
- Born: September 29, 1915; Kisbér, Austria-Hungary
- Died: December 7, 1994 (aged 79); Budapest, Hungary
- Citizenship: Hungarian
- Known for: linear programming matrix ring
- Spouse: Katalin Kovács(1919–2010) (h. 1944-1994)
- Scientific career
- Fields: mathematics, economics
- Institutions: Corvinus University of Budapest

Béla Krekó (29 September 1915 – 7 December 1994) was a Hungarian mathematician. His main research interests were linear programming and matrix ring. He was a university professor in Károly Marx University of Economics

== Biography ==
Krekó's parents were Ferenc Krekó and Terézia Princz. He married his wife Katalin Kovács (1919-2010) in 1944. His children are Béla (1945), István (1946), Ágnes (1948), and László (1951). In 1940, he obtained a degree in mathematics at the Pázmány Péter University, then in 1948 he also obtained a qualification in economics and a doctorate from the József Nádor University of Technology and Economics. From 1949 to 1954 he was a college teacher at the Academy of Commerce and then the Academy of Economic Engineering. From 1954 he was an associate professor at the Department of Mathematics of the Károly Marx University of Economics. In 1957, he wrote his book, "Introduction to Linear Programming." Author of additional books that serve as a foundation for generations. In 1959, he was the head of the department at the Department of Mathematics at the university, where he began the reform of mathematics education and the integration of the most important areas of operations research into education. From 1967 to 1980, he was director of the University Computer Center. He was appointed university professor in 1969. He played a prominent and decisive role in the 1961 launch of the plan-mathematical economist program. In 1975 he defended his dissertation at the Hungarian Academy of Sciences. He is the organizer and regular speaker of the first computer science education conferences. Until his death in 1994, he took part in the modernization of university education.

The National Memorial and Commemorative Committee decided to declare the resting place of Béla Krekó, economist, mathematician, part of the national cemetery by its decision No. 85/2022 (Budapest, Óbuda cemetery, 20-0-1-225)

== Notable works ==
- Bacskay Zoltán-Krekó Béla. Kombinatorika és valószínűségszámítás. A közgazdasági technikumok számára. Tankönyvkiadó. Bp., 1953. (in Hungarian)
- Krekó Béla–Bacskay Zoltán: Bevezetés a Lineáris programozásba; Közgazdasági és Jogi Könyvkiadó, Bp., 1957. (in Hungarian)
- Einige Fragen der linearen Programmierung. Wiss. Z. de:Technische Universität Dresden 1961. 10: 1073-1075. (In German)
- Lineáris programozás; Közgazdasági és Jogi Könyvkiadó, Bp., 1962. (in Hungarian)
- Ein neues Modell in der Verkehrsprogrammierung. Wiss. Z. de:Universität Rostock. 1962. 11:447-451. (In German)
- Krekó Béla–Berend Miklós: Kereskedelmi számtan; Közgazdasági és Jogi Könyvkiadó, Bp., 1962. (in Hungarian)
- Bacskay Zoltán–Krekó Béla: Matematikai alapismeretek; Közgazdasági és Jogi Könyvkiadó, Bp., 1963. (in Hungarian)
- Matrixszámítás; Közgazdasági és Jogi Kiadó, Bp., 1964 és 1966. (in Hungarian)
- Lehrbuch der linearen Optimierung; Berlin, VEB Deutscher Verlag der Wissenschaften, 1964. (in German)
- Über das stetige Optimierungproblem. Mathematik und Kybernetik in der Ökonomie. Akademie Verlag. Berlin. 1965. 285-295. (In German)
- Lineáris programozás (az 1962-ben megjelent könyv átdolgozott és bővített kiadása); Közgazdasági és Jogi Könyvkiadó, Bp., 1966. (in Hungarian)
- Linearno programiranje; Savremena administracija, Beograd 1966. (in Serbo-Croatian)
- Linear programming. Pitman, London. 1968 és American Elsevier Publishing Company, Boston. 1968.
- Optimumszámítás; Közgazdasági és Jogi Könyvkiadó, Bp., 1972. (in Hungarian)
- Optimierung: nichtlineare Modelle. VEB Deutscher Verlag der Wissenschaften; Berlin, 1974. (in German)
- Lineáris algebra; Közgazdasági és Jogi Könyvkiadó, Bp., 1976. (in Hungarian)
- Biztosítási matematika. Életbiztosítás I.; Aula, Bp., 1994. (in Hungarian)
- Krekó Béla. Új módszer az optimumszámításban. (in Hungarian) ANZDOC.
