= Szigetmonostor =

Coordinates: 47°41′N 19°07′E

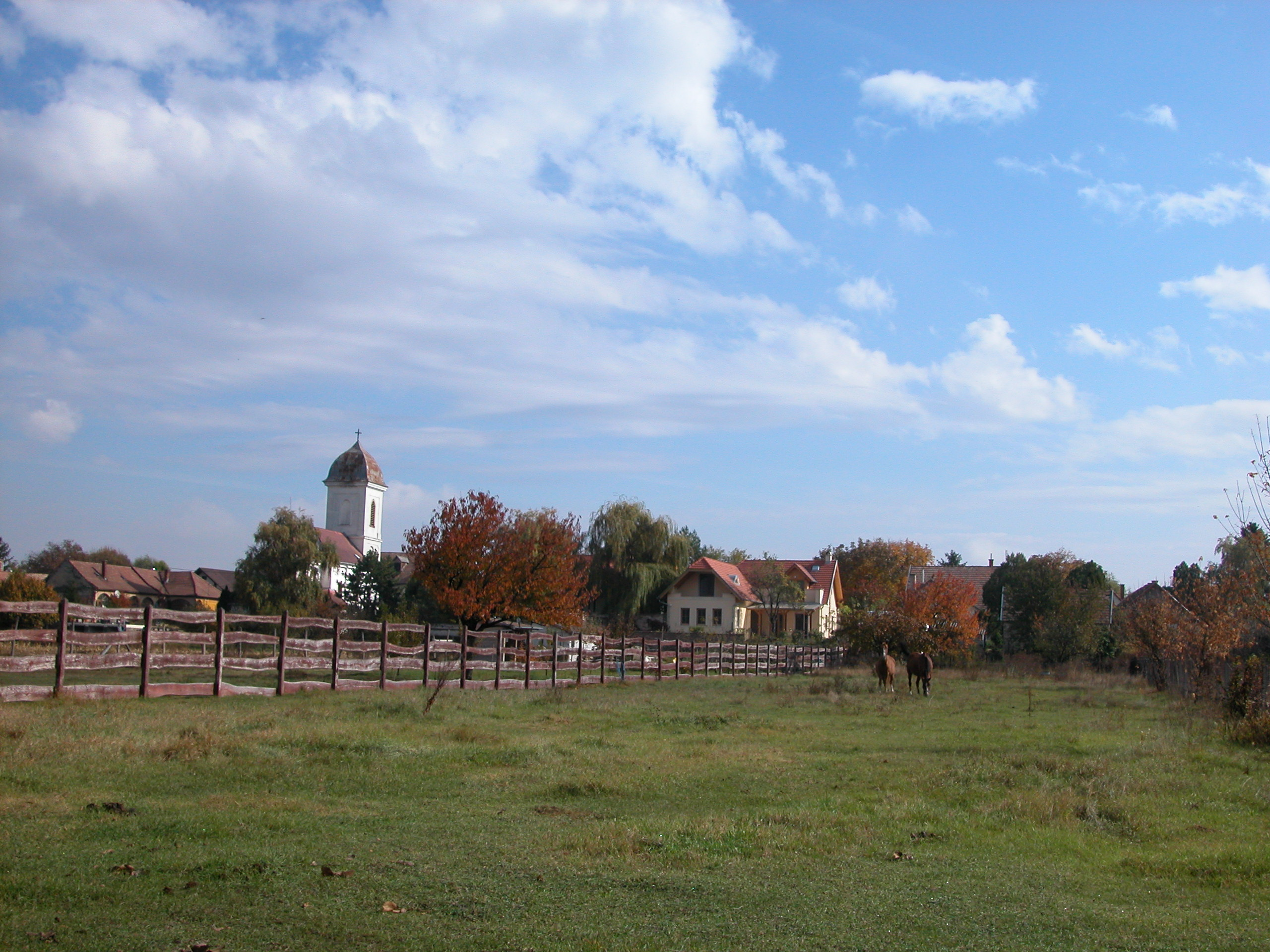

- Coat of arms
- Interactive map of Szigetmonostor
- Country: Hungary
- County: Pest
- District: Szentendre

Area
  - Total: 23.51 km^{2} (9.08 sq mi)

Population (2015)
  - Total: 2,292
  - Density: 97.49/km^{2} (252.5/sq mi)
- Time zone: UTC+1 (CET)
  - Summer (DST): UTC+2 (CEST)
- Postal code: 2015
- Area code: 26

Szigetmonostor is a village in Pest county, Hungary on Szentendre Island in the Danube north of Budapest. Most of the fresh water of Budapest came from the fountains of the village. In the village there is a ferry to Göd which is located on an island in the lake. The area is part of the Danube-Ipoly National Park.
