= Dunabogdány =

Place in Pest, Hungary

Dunabogdány Bogdan
- Village
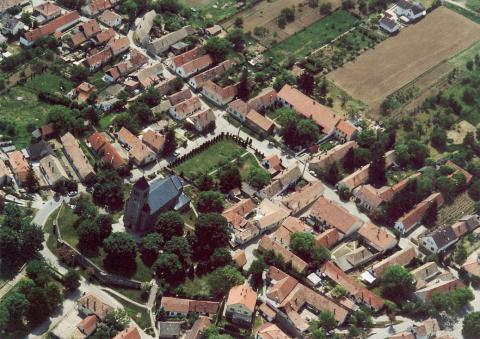
- Aerial photograph

- Flag Coat of arms

- Location of Dunabogdány
- Coordinates: 47.783333°N 19.033333°E
- Country: Hungary
- Region: Central Hungary
- County: Pest
- District: Szentendre

Area
  - Total: 25.5 km^{2} (9.8 sq mi)

Population (2023)
  - Total: 3,198
  - Density: 125/km^{2} (325/sq mi)
- Time zone: UTC+1 (CET)
  - Summer (DST): UTC+2 (CEST)
- Postal code: 2023
- Area code: (+36) 26
- Website: www.dunabogdany.hu

Dunabogdány (German: Bogdan; Slovak: Bohdanovce; Latin: Cirpi) is a village in Pest County, Budapest metropolitan area, Hungary.

The population consisted of 3,198 inhabitants in 2023.

In 2011 the settlement had a population of 3200. During the 2011 census, 89.3% of the residents identified themselves as Hungarian, 26.7% as German, 0.8% as Romanian, 0.5% as Romani, and 0.2% as Serb (10.6% did not declare). The religious distribution was as follows: Roman Catholic 62.8%, Reformed 10.3%, Lutheran 0.7%, Greek Catholic 0.4%, non-denominational 7.4% and 17.4% did not declare.
