= Kisoroszi =

- Village
- Flag Coat of arms

- Location of Kisoroszi
- Coordinates: 47.809722°N 19.0125°E
- Country: Hungary
- Region: Central Hungary
- County: Pest
- District: Szentendre

Area
  - Total: 10.94 km^{2} (4.22 sq mi)

Population (1 January 2026)
  - Total: 920
  - Density: 84/km^{2} (220/sq mi)
- Time zone: UTC+1 (CET)
  - Summer (DST): UTC+2 (CEST)
- Postal code: 2024
- Area code: (+36) 26
- Website: www.kisoroszi.hu

Kisoroszi is a village on Szentendre Island in Pest county, Budapest metropolitan area, Hungary. It has a population of 913 (2025).

== Landmarks ==
=== Szigetcsúcs (Island's Tip) ===
This is the most famous landmark in the village, located where the Danube River splits. From this point, you can see a panoramic view of the Pilis and Börzsöny mountains.

=== Roman Watchtowers ===
The village territory contains archaeological remains of ancient Roman frontier watchtowers and fortifications, which were built along the Danube branch as part of the historic Roman Limes system.

== Transport and Access ==
=== Getting into the village ===
The way to get into the village are either driving in from the south via route 1113, or across the water via a passenger and car ferry from Visegrád.

=== Public transport ===
The village is a part of the regional bus line Volánbusz line 898. The line ends in Hősök tere bus station in the center Kisoroszi, where then having to go south and repeat the line.
