= Szentendre Island =

Hungarian Island in the Danube river

Native name: Szentendrei-sziget
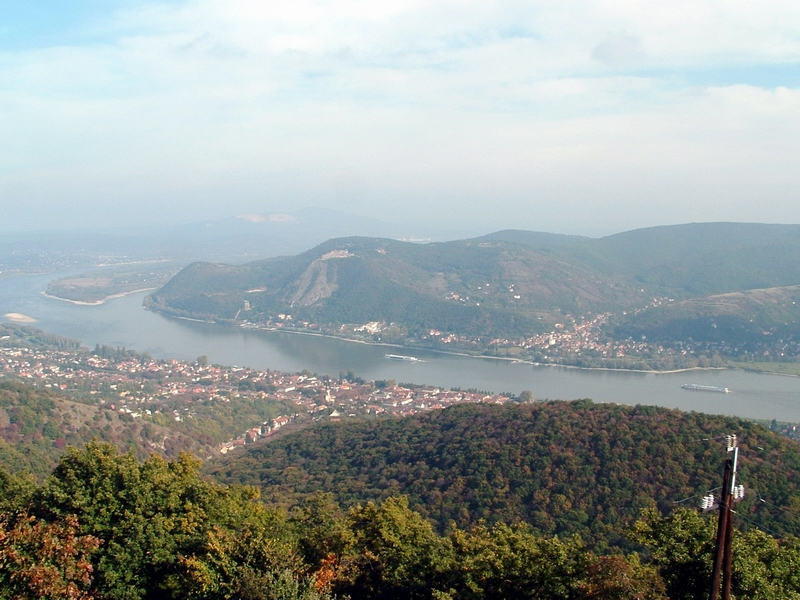
- The north end of Szentendre Island is visible on the left of this aerial view of the Danube Bend

- Location within Hungary

Geography
- Location: Danube River
- Coordinates: 47°44′50″N 19°06′32″E

Administration
- Hungary

Szentendre Island (Hungarian: Szentendrei-sziget) is an island in the Danube River between the Danube Bend and Budapest in Hungary. The island is flanked by the Szentendre branch of the Danube to the west, and the main branch of the river to the east. It is 31 km long with an area of 56 km^{2}, and forms part of the Szentendre District of Pest County.

The Megyeri Bridge, carrying Budapests's M0 motorway ring road, crosses the southern tip of the island, but there is no access to the island's road network from it. The island is connected to the mainland by the Tildy Bridge that crosses the Szentendre branch. There are also a number of ferries, across both the Szentendre and main branches of the Danube.

Several villages are located on the island including (from north to south) Kisoroszi, Tahitótfalu, Pócsmegyer, Surány, Szigetmonostor and Horány. In addition to farmland, orchards and vineyards, the island's most important role is to supply Budapest and the neighbouring towns with water.
