= Pócsmegyer =

- Flag Coat of arms

- Location of Pócsmegyer in Hungary
- Coordinates: 47.71697°N 19.10473°E
- Country: Hungary
- Region: Central Hungary
- County: Pest
- Subregion: Szentendrei
- Rank: Village

Area
  - Total: 13.08 km^{2} (5.05 sq mi)

Population (1 January 2008)
  - Total: 1,644
  - Density: 125.7/km^{2} (325.5/sq mi)
- Time zone: UTC+1 (CET)
  - Summer (DST): UTC+2 (CEST)
- Postal code: 2017
- Area code: +36 26
- KSH code: 04905
- Website: http://www.pocsmegyer.hu

Pócsmegyer is a village on Szentendre Island in Pest county, Hungary.
