= Tahitótfalu =

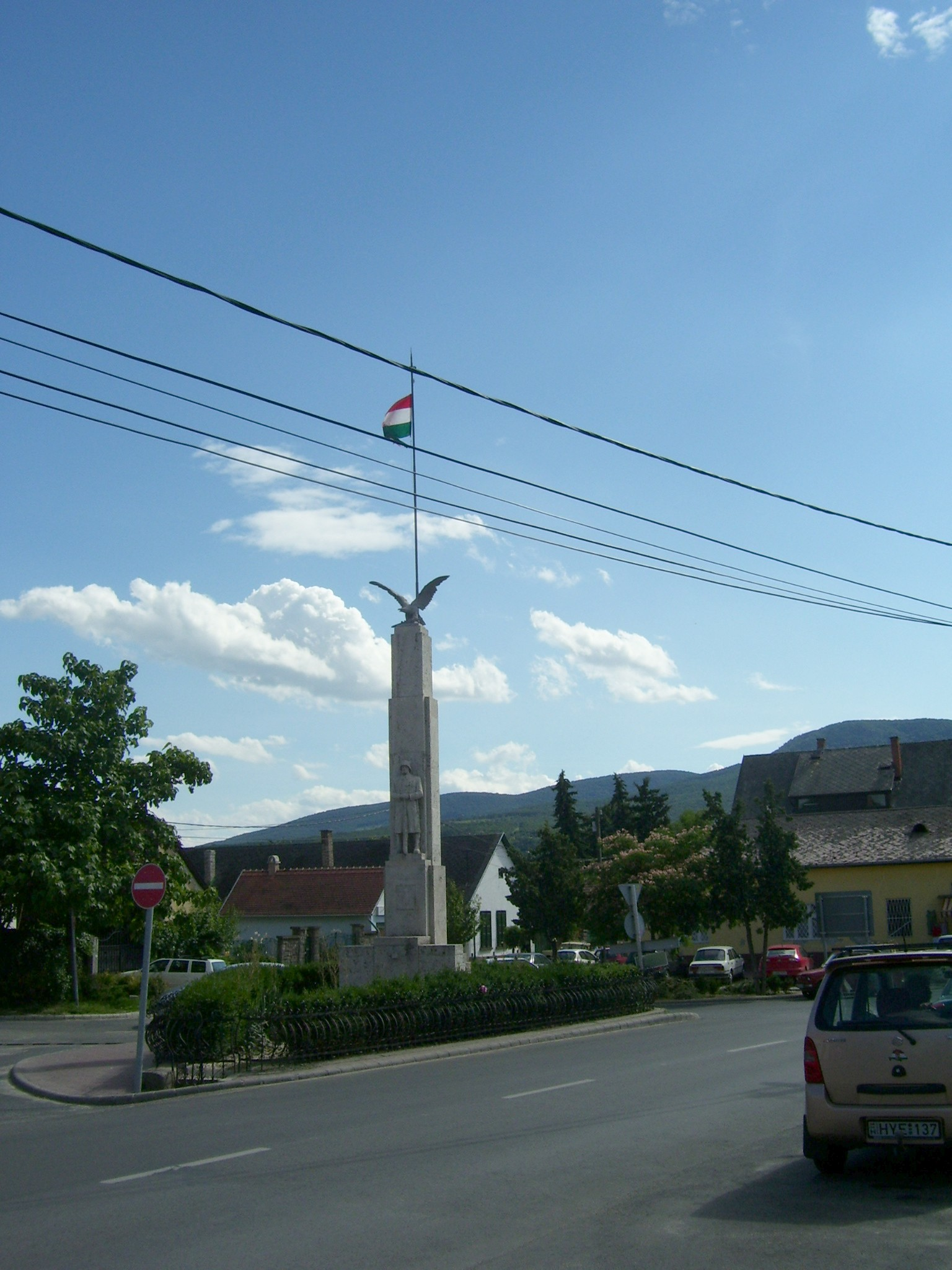

- Flag Coat of arms

- Location of Tahitótfalu in Hungary
- Coordinates: 47.75225°N 19.07808°E
- Country: Hungary
- Region: Central Hungary
- County: Pest
- Subregion: Szentendrei
- Rank: Village

Area
  - Total: 39.17 km^{2} (15.12 sq mi)

Population (1 January 2008)
  - Total: 5,317
  - Density: 135.7/km^{2} (351.6/sq mi)
- Time zone: UTC+1 (CET)
  - Summer (DST): UTC+2 (CEST)
- Postal code: Tótfalu: 2021, Tahi: 2022
- Area code: +36 26
- KSH code: 31963
- Website: www.tahitotfalu.hu

Tahitótfalu is a village in northern Pest county, Hungary, 28 kilometres (17 mi) north of Budapest on the Buda side. It is a union of two formerly distinct settlements: Tahi, on the mainland, and Tótfalu on Szentendre Island. They are connected by the Tildy Bridge, the only fixed link between Szentendre Island and the mainland.

== Etymology ==
Tahi (lit. 'of Tah') derives its name from the Thah family, who owned much of the land on the Danube's western bank. Tótfalu (lit. 'Slav Village') is named after the village's medieval Slovene inhabitants.

== Buildings and structures ==
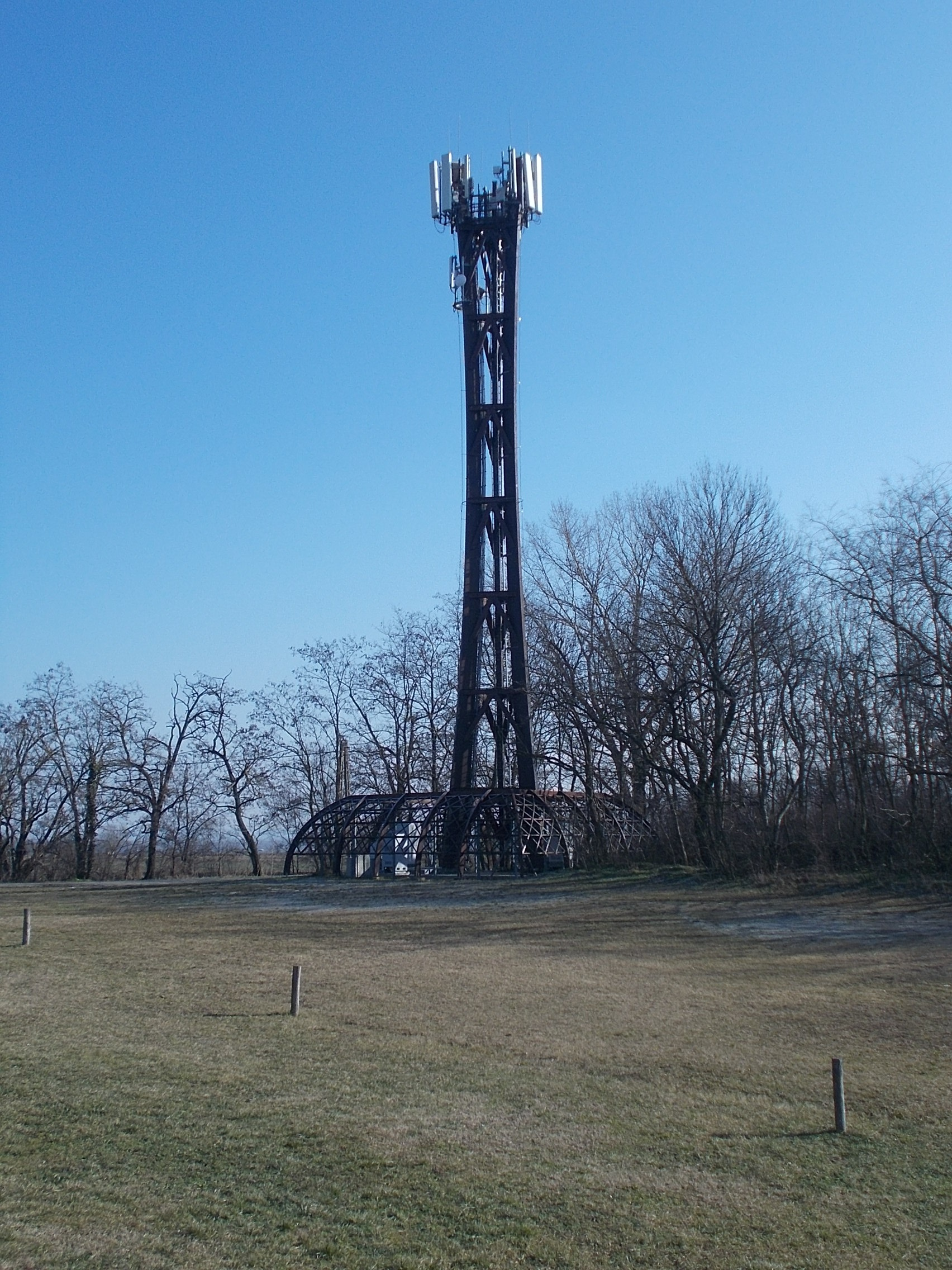
Wooden cellphone tower

At Tahitótfalu, there is a wooden cellphone transmission tower. Such towers are very rare.
