= Summer Campaign (1849) =

1849 campaign during the Hungarian War of Independence of 1848-1849

- Part of the Hungarian War of Independence of 1848–1849
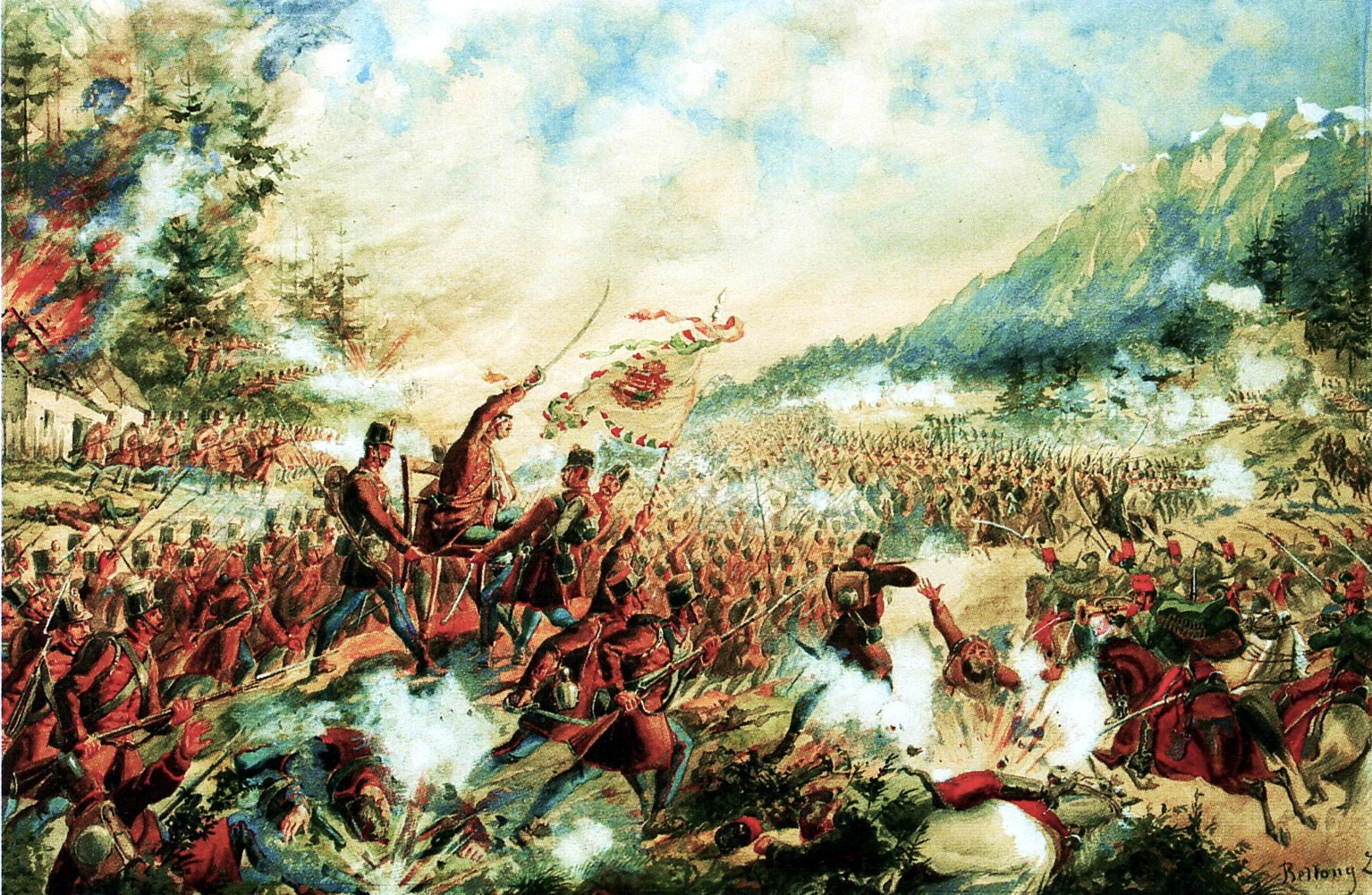
- The Battle of the Tömös Pass on 20 June 1849, when a small detachment of 5,000 Hungarian troops tried to stop an army of 27,000 Russians from breaking into Transylvania (painting by László Bellony)
Date	15 June – 2 October 1849
Location	Kingdom of Hungary and Principality of Transylvania (1711–1867)
Result	Austro-Russian victory: The achievements of the Hungarian Revolution of 1848 were abolished; Hungarian State was abolished; Restoration of the full authority of the Habsburg Empire over Hungary.

Belligerents
Austrian Empire: Kingdom of Croatia; Serbian Vojvodina; Serb rebels; Pro-Habsburg Hungarians; Slovak National Council; Transylvanian Romanians; Transylvanian Saxons; Supreme Ruthenian Council; Czech and Moravian volunteers; Russian Empire	Hungarian State: Legions of the revolutionaries from German states; Polish legions; Italian legions; Székelys; Hungarian Jews; Hungarian Germans; Hungarian Slovenes; Pro-Hungarian Slovaks; Pro-Hungarian Romanians; Pro-Hungarian Serbs; Pro-Hungarian Rusyns; Zipser Saxons; Croats from Western Hungary and Muraköz; Šokac and Bunjevac people; Banat Bulgarians

Commanders and leaders
(Austrian Empire) Franz Joseph I; (Austrian Empire) Julius Jacob von Haynau; (Austrian Empire) Ludwig von Benedek; (Austrian Empire) Franz Schlik; (Austrian Empire) Franz Wyss †; (Austrian Empire) Eduard Clam-Gallas; (Austrian Empire) Anton Puchner; (Austrian Empire) Josip Jelačić; (Austrian Empire) Stevan Knićanin; (Austrian Empire) Avram Iancu; (Russian Empire) Nicholas I; (Russian Empire) Ivan Paskevich; (Russian Empire) Grigory Skariatin †	(Hungarian State (1849)) Lajos Kossuth; (Hungarian State (1849)) Artúr Görgei (POW); (Hungarian State (1849)) György Klapka; (Hungarian State (1849)) Lajos Aulich (executed); (Hungarian State (1849)) Mór Perczel; (Hungarian State (1849)) Károly Vécsey (executed); (Hungarian State (1849)) Antal Vetter; (Hungarian State (1849)) Pál Kiss; (Hungarian State (1849)) Richard Guyon; (Hungarian State (1849)) Sándor Gál; (Poland) Henryk Dembiński; (Poland) Józef Bem

Strength
(Austrian Empire) 177,964 soldiers & 818 guns; (Russian Empire) 193,000 soldiers & 584 guns; (Austrian Empire) 70,000 men; (Austrian Empire) 900 men	172,440 soldiers & 472 guns

The Summer Campaign (Hungarian: nyári hadjárat) was the military campaign of the armed forces of the Habsburg Empire and Russian Empire against the troops of the Hungarian State with the intent to end its independence and abolish the achievements of the Hungarian Revolution of 1848. Following the Hungarian army's successful Spring Campaign, Franz Joseph I requested assistance from Tsar Nicholas I of Russia on May 21, 1849. The Tsar dispatched an army of nearly 200,000 Russian soldiers led by Marshal Ivan Paskevich to fight Hungary. The Austrian main army was led by Field Marshal Julius Jacob von Haynau. The enemy armies attacked Hungary from all 4 directions. The much smaller Hungarian army was led by General Artúr Görgei. Despite scoring many surprising successes, the Hungarian army was ultimately defeated by the superior forces of the two empires. On August 13, Görgei's main army surrendered to the Russian army. The remaining Hungarian troops and forts surrendered by October 2. Most of the Hungarian political and military elite fled the country. Those who remained were either executed or imprisoned.

== Background ==
On December 2, 1848, Ferdinand V was deposed and succeeded by Franz Joseph I because Ferdinand had signed the April Laws, preventing him from ordering an attack on Hungary. However, Franz Joseph had not signed the laws, allowing him to order the attack. The Hungarians did not support this change and continued to regard Ferdinand as their ruler. At this time, Hungary was not considered an independent state; therefore, until 14 April 1849 (declaration of Hungary's independence) the war can be regarded as a civil war. In December, Franz Joseph launched a general attack against Hungary. The main forces, led by Field Marshal Alfred I, Prince of Windisch-Grätz, attacked along the Danube. Opposing them was the Upper Danube Army, led by Artúr Görgei. Görgei retreated from the superior forces, strengthening his troops along the way. A conflict arose between Lajos Kossuth and Görgei. The commander-in-chief avoided a decisive battle with the much superior imperial army to preserve his troops, but the politician demanded victory to maintain morale. Görgei did not agree, but General Mór Perczel, trying to please Kossuth, attempted to confront the Austrian army. However, on December 30, 1848, Perczel suffered a crushing defeat in the Battle of Mór at the hands of the imperial army led by Lieutenant General Josip Jelačić. The main forces surrendered Pest without a fight (January 4). The National Assembly decided to continue the fight. In the middle of winter (taking advantage of the new Pest-Szolnok railway line), the government and the National Assembly were moved to Debrecen, and the military industry to Nagyvárad.

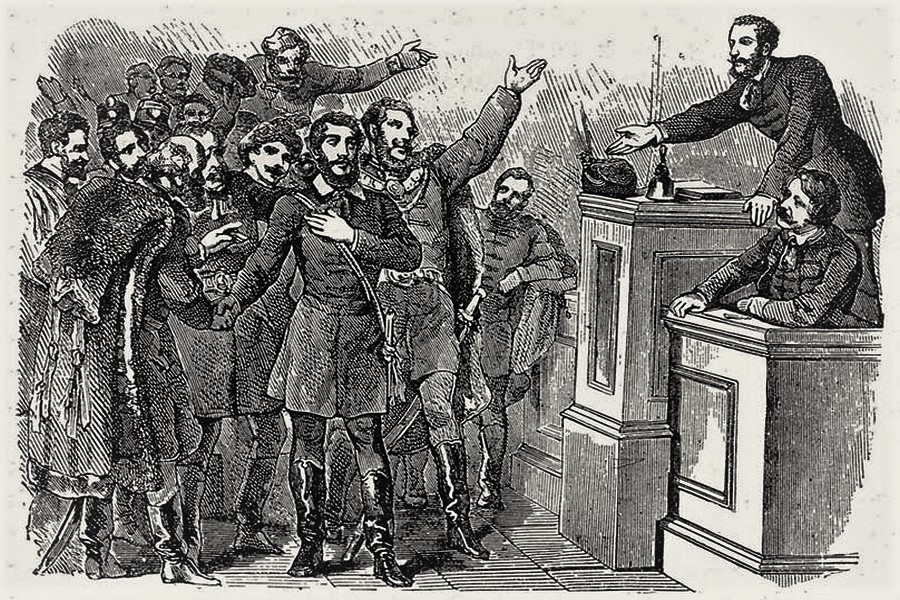
Kossuth is elected Governor of Hungary after the Declaration of Independence on 14 April 1849

Görgei marched through Vác towards Northern Hungary (Felvidék) to divert Windisch-Gratz's main forces from attacking Debrecen. In early February, the division led by Richard Guyon occupied the Branyiszkó Pass, thus opening the way for Görgei's army into the Hernád Valley. In the region of Kassa, he was able to unite with György Klapka's army, and together with the troops led by János Damjanich, significant forces were lined up against Windisch-Grätz. Kossuth appointed the Pole Henryk Dembiński to lead troops in a counter-attack against the main imperial army. However, due to Dembinski's indecisiveness, the Hungarian army suffered defeat in the Battle of Kápolna on February 26–27, 1849. Windisch-Grätz exaggerated the battle's significance and reported to the emperor that the uprising had been completely crushed. Thus, the Schwarzenberg government saw that the time had come to issue the Olmütz Constitution on March 4, 1849, which incorporated Hungary into the centralized empire. The defeat of Kápolna exacerbated the conflicts within the Hungarian army: Dembiński was deposed through a revolt of the Hungarian officers at Tiszafüred, but Kossuth did not want to appoint Görgei in his place, naming instead Antal Vetter as high commander. But at the end of March, Vetter got ill, forcing the reluctant Kossuth to appoint Görgei as commander in chief. In Transylvania, the local high command openly opposed the Hungarian government (October 18, 1848), and with the troops at its disposal launched an attack against the weak Hungarian forces in Transylvania, also relying on Romanian border guards and popular uprisings, but the Székely uprising prevented the enemy from breaking out into the Tiszántúl Region, which, after Pest's occupation, was the government's base. By the end of March, Polish General Józef Bem had driven the Austrians out of Transylvania: he moved his troops quickly, made constant use of artillery, and did not shy away from daring ventures. Major battles: Capture of Kolozsvár (December 24, 1848) and Marosvásárhely (January 13, 1849), First Battle of Nagyszeben (21 January 1849), Battle of Vízakna (4 February 1849), Battle of Piski (February 9, 1849) and the Second Battle of Nagyszeben (11 March 1849).

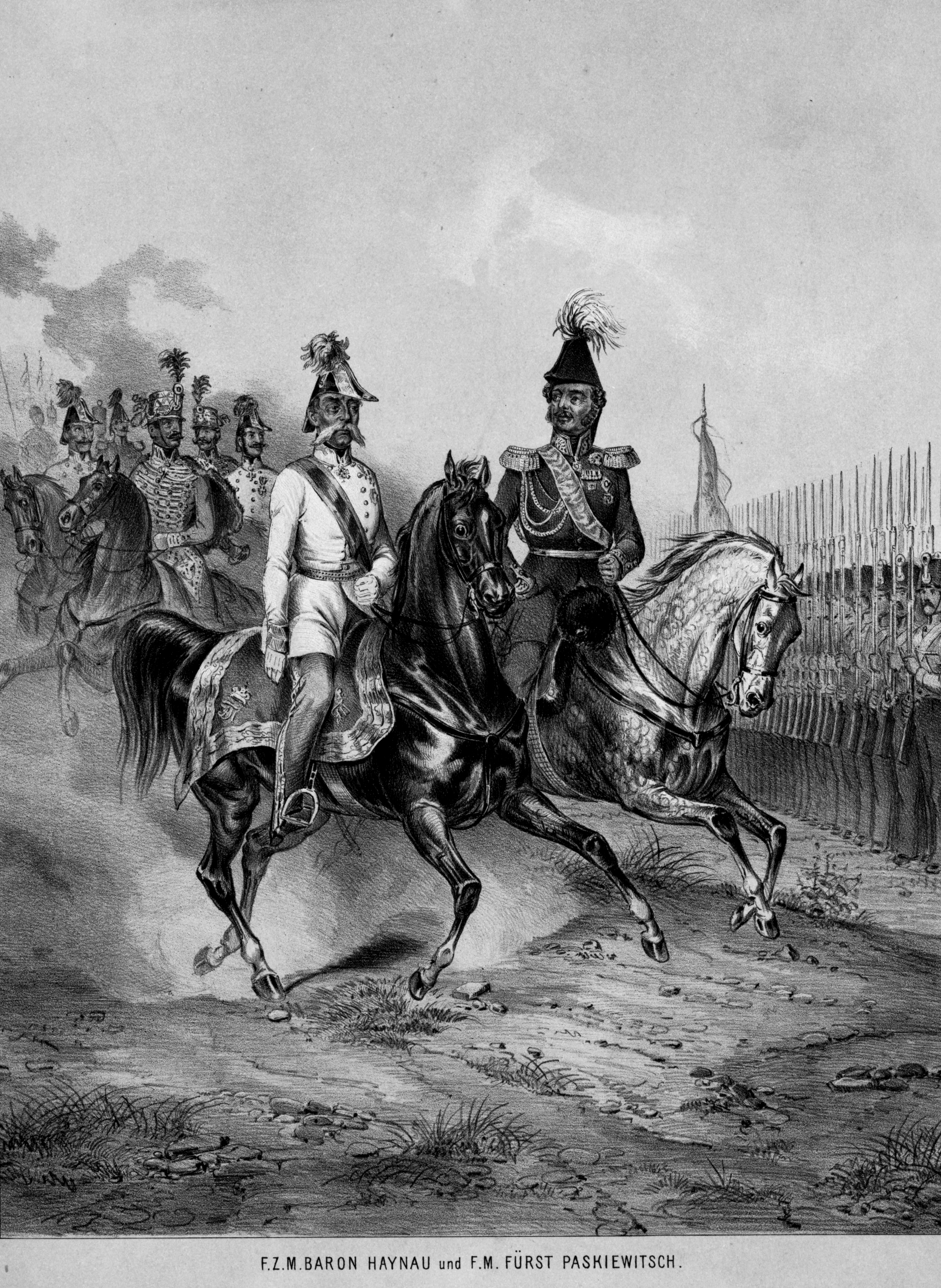
Ivan Paskevich and Haynau in front of the troops

The new Hungarian military leadership set out to encircle and defeat the enemy. In April, the Hungarian army defeated the imperial forces in six battles (Hatvan on 2 April, Tápióbicske on 4 April, Isaszeg on 6 April, Vác on 10 April, Nagysalló on 19 April, and Komárom on 26 April). However, the main Austrian forces escaped the encirclements at Gödöllő and Komárom. This enabled them to reorganize later. On May 21, 1849, the Hungarians captured Buda Castle by siege, thereby liberating the Hungarian capitals.

In the spring of 1849, Hungarians achieved additional successes on other fronts. Except for the fortresses of Arad and Temesvár, and the Syrmia region, they captured southern Hungary (Délvidék). The small Hungarian detachments led by Ármin Görgey and Lajos Beniczky occupied most of Upper Hungary. The popular uprising led by Gáspár Noszlopy captured southern Transdanubia. And, as mentioned before, the Transylvanian Army of Józef Bem captured much of Transylvania.

In response to the Olmütz Constitution, the Hungarian National Assembly declared the Habsburg dynasty deposed and Hungary independent on April 14 in Debrecen. Thus, the Hungarian State was founded. They did not decide on the form of government, but they did elect Lajos Kossuth governor and form a new constitutional government under the leadership of Bertalan Szemere. However, since the great powers regarded the Habsburg Empire as a pillar of European balance against the Russians, the declaration of independence did not improve the country's foreign policy situation.

Alarmed by Hungary's successes and fearing that he could not defeat them with his own forces, on May 21, 1849, Emperor Franz Joseph I asked the Russian Tsar, Nicholas I, for help.

== The calling of the Russians ==
According to the Treaty of Münchengrätz of 1833, Austria could count on the help of Russia's army, but the Austrian government was reluctant to ask for help. By the end of March 1849, it had become increasingly evident, that the imperial army alone was incapable of putting down the Hungarian "rebellion". Negotiations in preparation for the intervention started at the end of March, and the formal request for assistance was made on 21 April. The Austrian side wanted to ask for only a few tens of thousands of Russian auxiliary forces fighting under Austrian command. Tsar Nicholas I of Russia, however, believed that he had to act with a strong army that alone could crush the revolution.

== The opposing forces ==
=== The Anti-Hungarian coalition ===
==== The Austrian army and its allies ====
The Imperial Army under the command of Field Marshal Julius Jacob von Haynau consisted of the following army groupings.

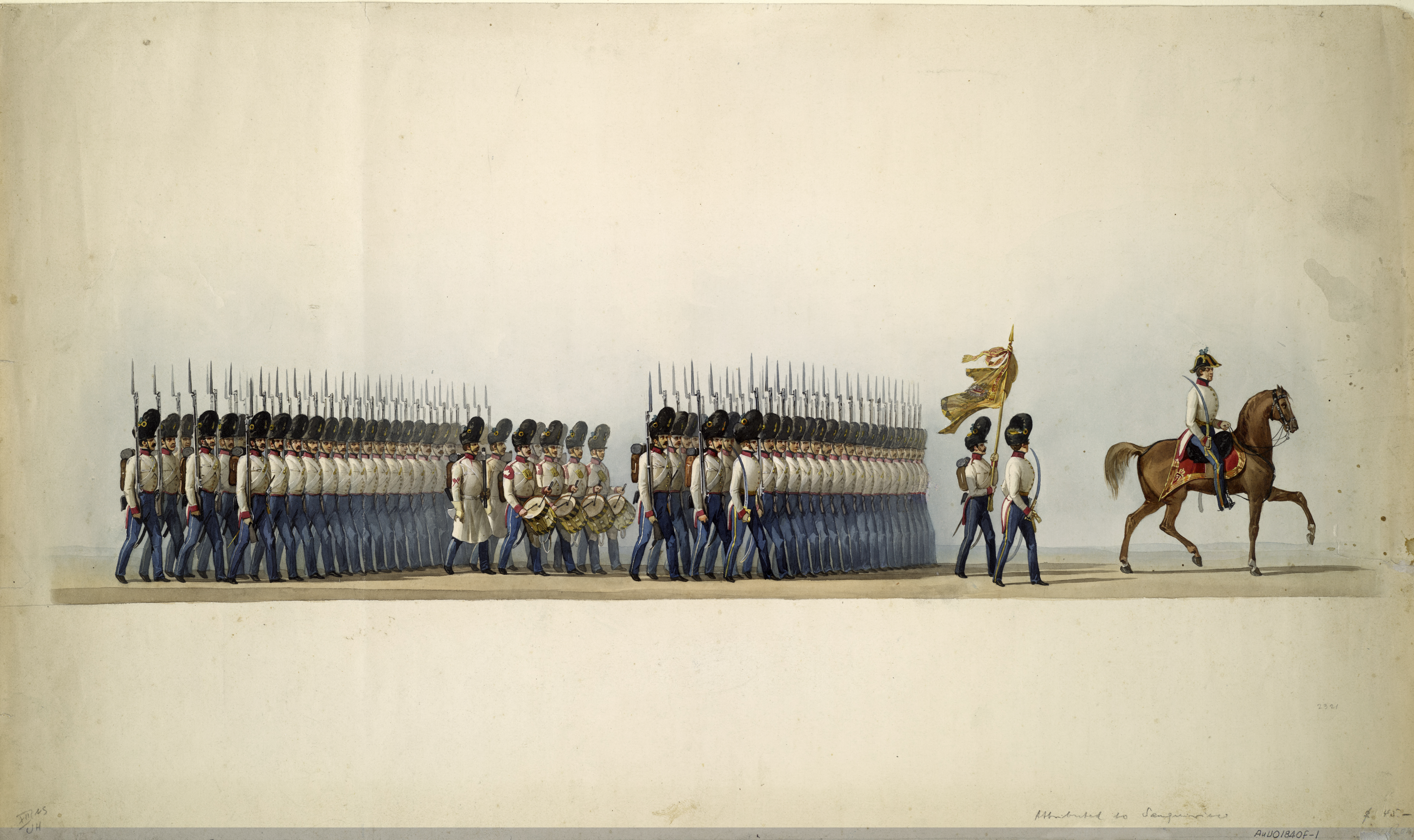
Austrian grenadiers parading (c. 1840)

The Army of the Danube consisted of 4 corps (I, II, III, IV) and a Russian division, which amounted to 82,570 soldiers and 336 guns.

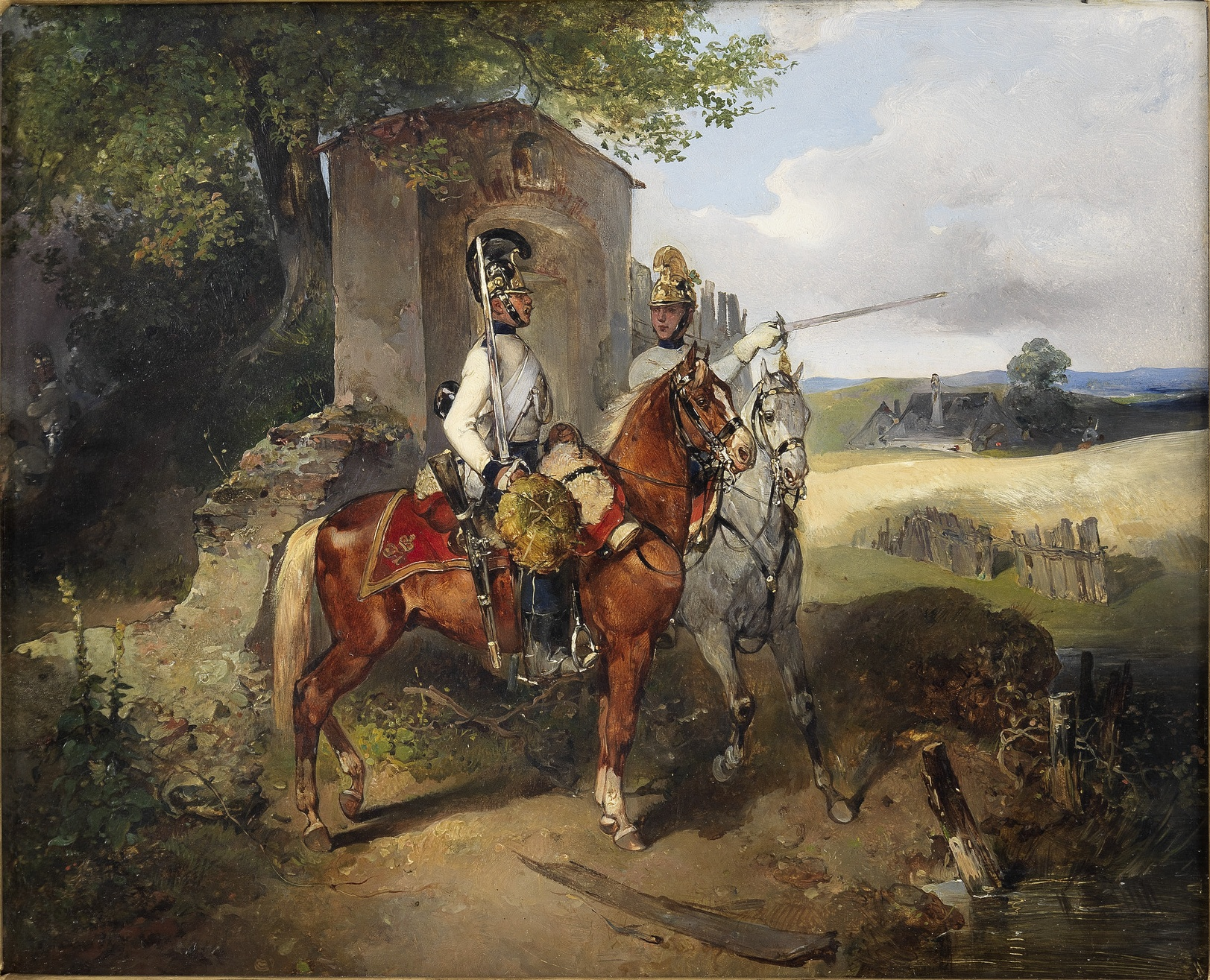
Two Dragoons (by Karl Schindler) 1842

In addition, there were two battalions and six companies stationed in various forts and towns in western Hungary or assigned to guard the main artillery reserves.

The Southern Army, commanded by Lieutenant General Josip Jelačić, consisted of a corps, 3 divisions, a cavalry division, and the Temesvár and Arad garrisons, which totaled 54,392 Austrian and Serbian soldiers and 401 cannons. The Transylvanian corps, led by Lieutenant General Eduard Clamm-Gallas consisted of 12,000 soldiers and 36 guns. The Austrian troops in Transylvania were joined by a column led by Colonel Karl Urban, then Colonel Springensfeld, with 3000 soldiers and 9 guns. These were joined by a couple of reserve corps, such as the 1st Reserve Corps under Lieutenant General Johann Nobili with 6,000 soldiers and 12 guns, and the 2nd Reserve Corps under Field Marshal Laval Nugent with 8,500 soldiers and 24 guns. The garrisons and other troops totaled 10,000 soldiers with an unknown number of guns. Thus, the total Imperial Army attacking Hungary consisted of 177,964 soldiers and artillery, which exceeded 818 guns.

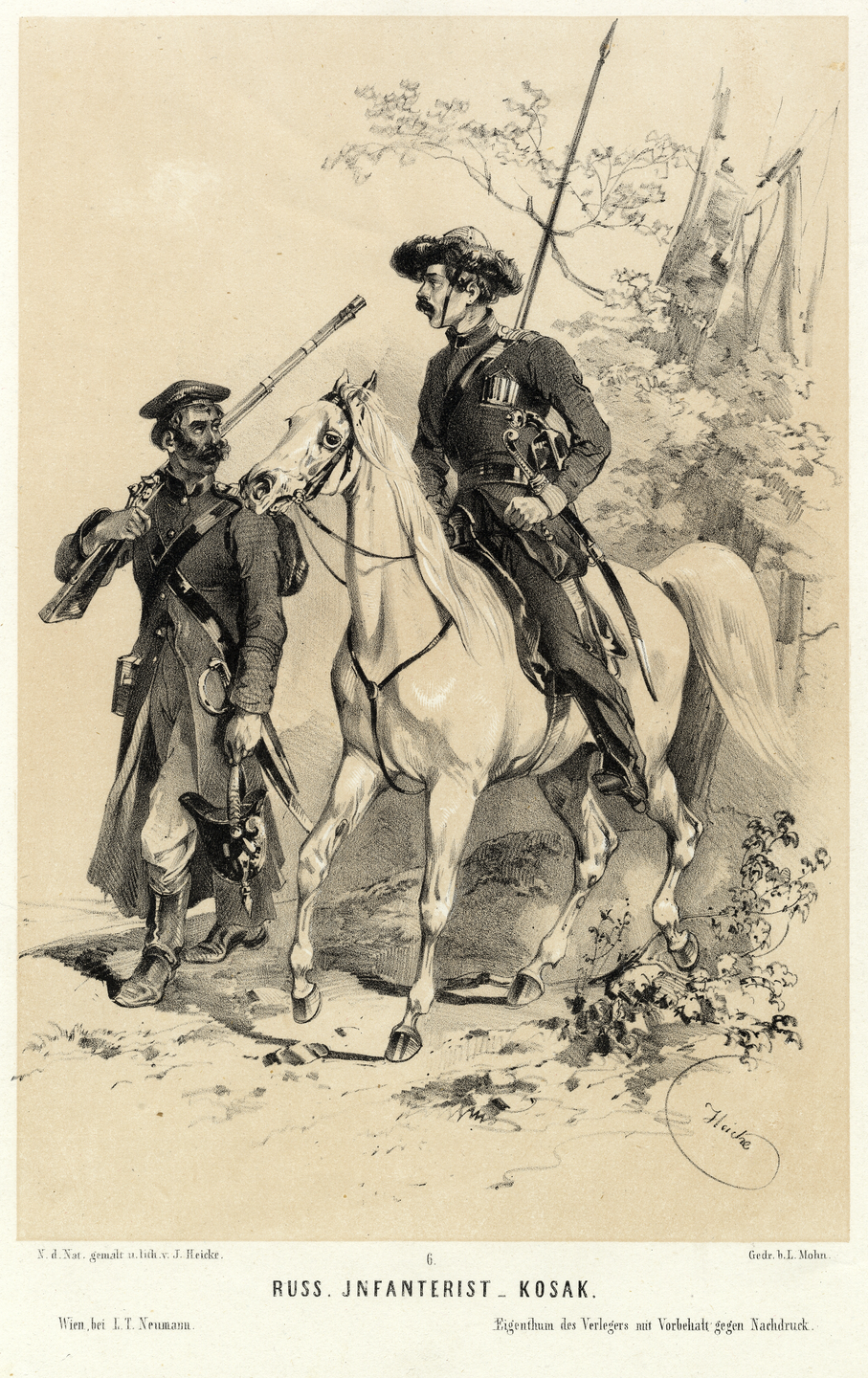
Russian Cosack and infantry soldier in 1849 (Joseph Heicke)

Among the irregular troops that supported the Austrians were the Romanians, who retreated to the Ore Mountains of Transylvania, led by Avram Iancu. The number of these Romanian rebels was estimated at 70,000. Besides them, it was the Slovak legion, which consisted of about 900 men.

==== The Russian army ====
In 1849 Tsar Nicholas I mobilized for the Hungarian campaign, the entire II, III, and IV Infantry Corps of the Russian army, the majority of the V Infantry Corps, some units of the I Infantry Corps and the II Reserve Cavalry Corps, about 10 Cossack regiments, 4 companies of Caucasian Circassian cavalry and 6 companies of Muslim cavalry from the southern Caucasus region. The I Infantry Corps, the undeployed part of the II Reserve Cavalry Corps, and the entire III Reserve Cavalry Corps were waiting at the Hungarian borders as reserves. These totalled 193,000 soldiers and 584 guns. Of these, 135,500 soldiers and 448 guns were stationed at the borders of Northern Hungary, 37,000 soldiers and 88 guns at the borders of Transylvania, while 12 000 Russian soldiers and 48 guns joined the Austrian main force under Haynau.

=== The Hungarian army ===
The Hungarian main army led by General Artur Görgei, which was concentrated in the western part of the country, around the Rába and Vág rivers, consisted of 5 corps (I, II, III, VII, VIII), 1 independent division (György Kmety's division) and 3 mobile columns (led by Lajos Beniczky, Ármin Görgey and János Horváth). This totalled 62 640 soldiers and 229 guns.

The Northern Army, led by Lieutenant General Henryk Dembiński, consisted of 1 corps (IX Corps) and a separate division (Kazinczy's Division) with 16 500 soldiers and 57 guns. The reserve corps, led by General Richard Guyon, had 9 500 soldiers and 12 guns. The southern (Bács-Bánság) army under the command of Lieutenant-General Vetter consisted of two corps (IV, V) and the garrison of Pétervárad, which totaled 36,800 soldiers and 109 field guns, 49 siege guns and 64 fortress cannons. The Transylvanian army, which included 1 corps (VI) and the siege troops of Gyulafehérvár, totaled 27 000 soldiers 65 field guns, and 10 siege cannons. To these were added the Székely and Hungarian militias and mobile national guards, which amounted to about 20,000 armed men.

This amounted to 172,440 soldiers and 472 guns.

In addition, there were 465 heavy guns in Komárom and 392 in Pétervárad, for a total of 857.

== Balance of forces ==
Before the new campaign, the balance of power could not be more disadvantageous for the Hungarians. The total number of the Hungarian regular troops is still not known most exactly: the most accurate estimate is about 150,000 men, 464 field, and 393 fortress cannons. The total number of the Imperial Army was close to 165,000, with 770 guns (about half of them fortress guns). The Russian intervention force numbered nearly 193,000 and 584 guns, i.e., 358,000 enemy soldiers and 1,354 guns against 150,000 soldiers and 857 guns. A further 60,000 Russian troops were still on standby in Galicia and 15,000 in Wallachia.

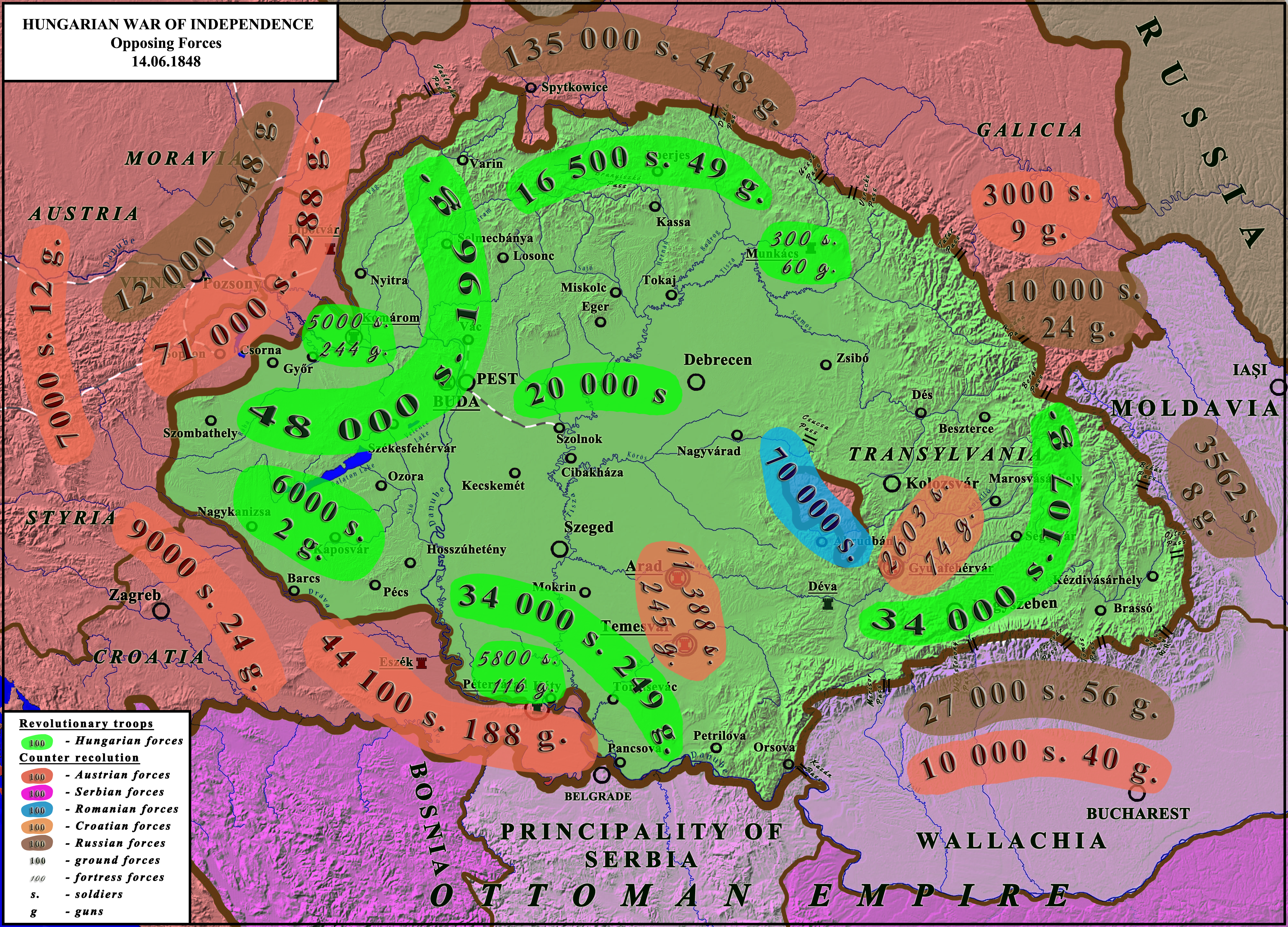
Balance of forces during the Hungarian wars of Independence of 1848–1849 before the start of the Summer Campaign

As for the balance of forces in the different theatres of war, the situation was as follows. The Hungarian main army, including the Komárom garrison, had about 53,000 men, 196 field guns, and 244 fortress guns. In contrast, the Danube army of Field Marshal Haynau had about. 71,000 troops and 288 guns. However, this force was supplemented at the beginning of the campaign by a combined Russian infantry division, which alone numbered about 12,000 troops and 48 guns. In total, under Haynau's command, an intervention force of 83,000 soldiers and 336 guns was ready to fight.

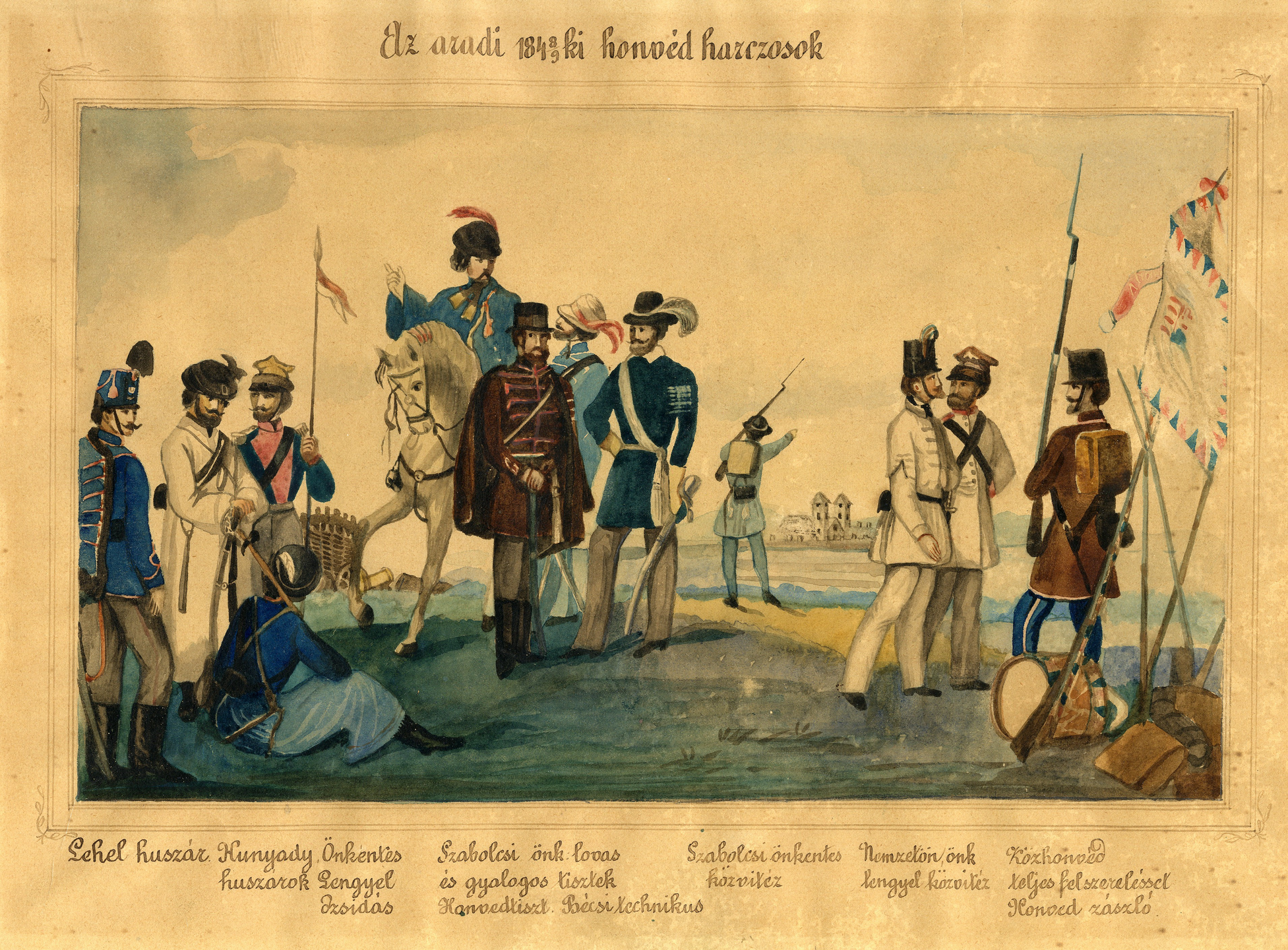
Honvéds in 1848–1849. From left to rightː 14th (Lehel) Hussar, 13th (Hunyadi) volunteer Hussar, Polish Uhlan, Volunteer rider and infantry officers from Szabolcs, Honvéd officer, Technician from Vienna, Volunteer Commoner from Szabolcs, etc.

The Hungarian forces in Northern Hungary were in the most desperate situation: 16,500 and 49 guns defended the border counties against 135,500 Russian soldiers and 448 guns. The overwhelming force here was nine times larger! In the southern theatre of operations, some 34,000 Hungarian soldiers and 249 guns fought against the 53,000 soldiers and 401 guns strong K.u.K. and Serb troops. In Transylvania, 39,000 Hungarians with 107 cannons faced 53,000 Russian and Austrian intervention forces with 133 guns. Besides these, the K.u.K. army had a reserve force of 25,000 soldiers and 36 guns in Styria and Moravia, ready to invade Hungary if needed, and also various garrison troops

The Hungarians' unfavorable situation was complicated even more by the fact that part of the Hungarian troops in southern Hungary and in Transylvania were encircling the fortresses of Arad, Temesvár, and Gyulafehérvár. This number was at least 12 000, with a further 8000 forming the permanent garrison troops of Pétervárad, Komárom, and Munkács. In other words, 13% of the Hungarian army could not be used in field battles.

Apart from the fact that the Hungarian troops were largely made up of young, inexperienced troops and that there was a lack of coordination and agreement in the leadership, the inadequate number of the forces available left little doubt about the sad outcome of the future uneven fighting.

== Fights on the main war theater ==
=== The battle of the main armies along the Danube and the Vág ===
Operations on the main battlefield did not restart until mid-June, but due to the Austro-Russian overwhelming force, the Hungarian resistance did not promise victory.

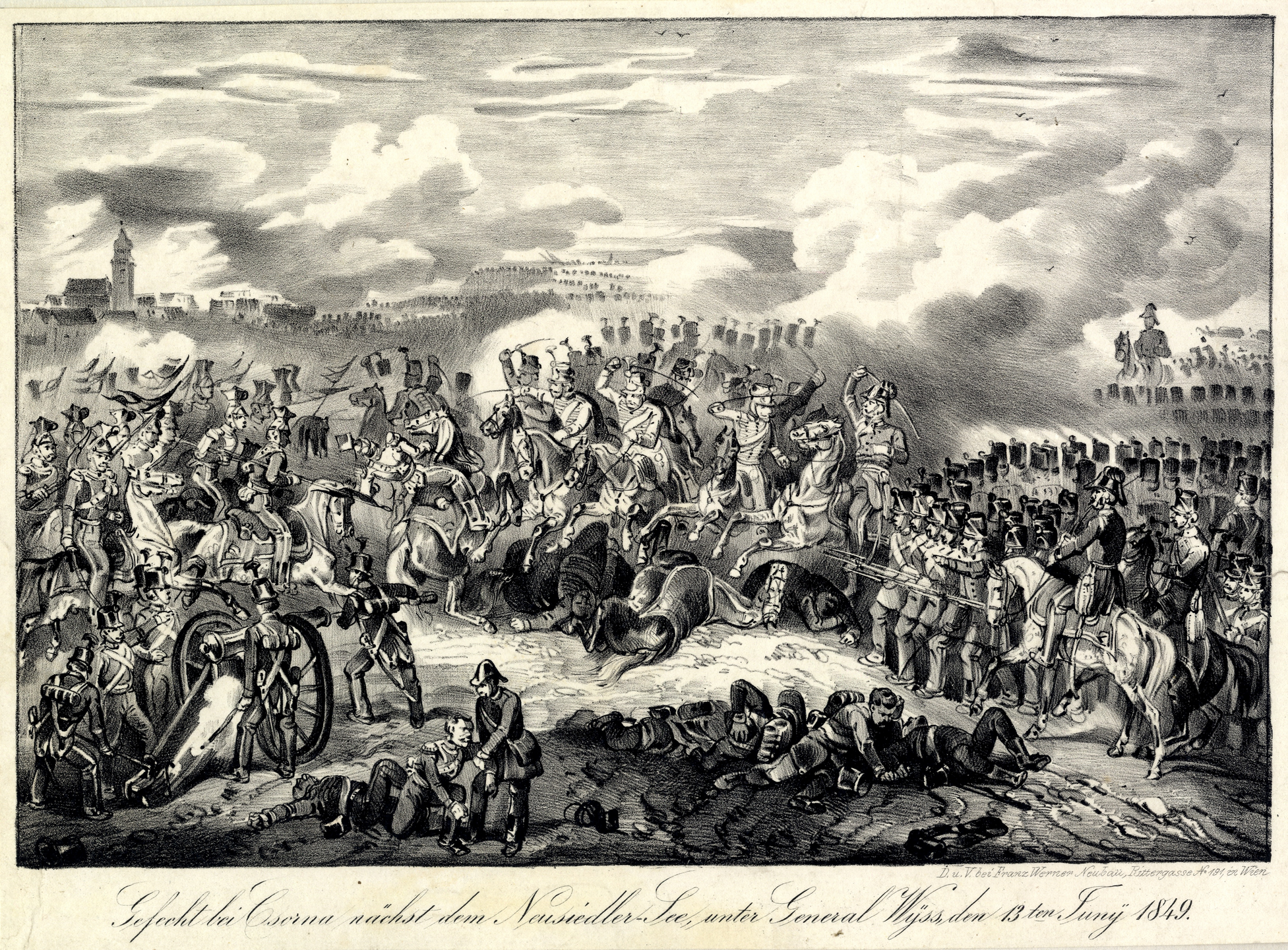
Battle of Csorna (13 June 1849)

But it was not the same whether the Hungarian army ended the war destroyed, or with some kind of success, or perhaps with a compromise. There was one way to do this: by concentrating forces. Görgei saw that he could only hope for success if he could defeat the K.u.K. Army before the slow-moving Russian main force arrived.

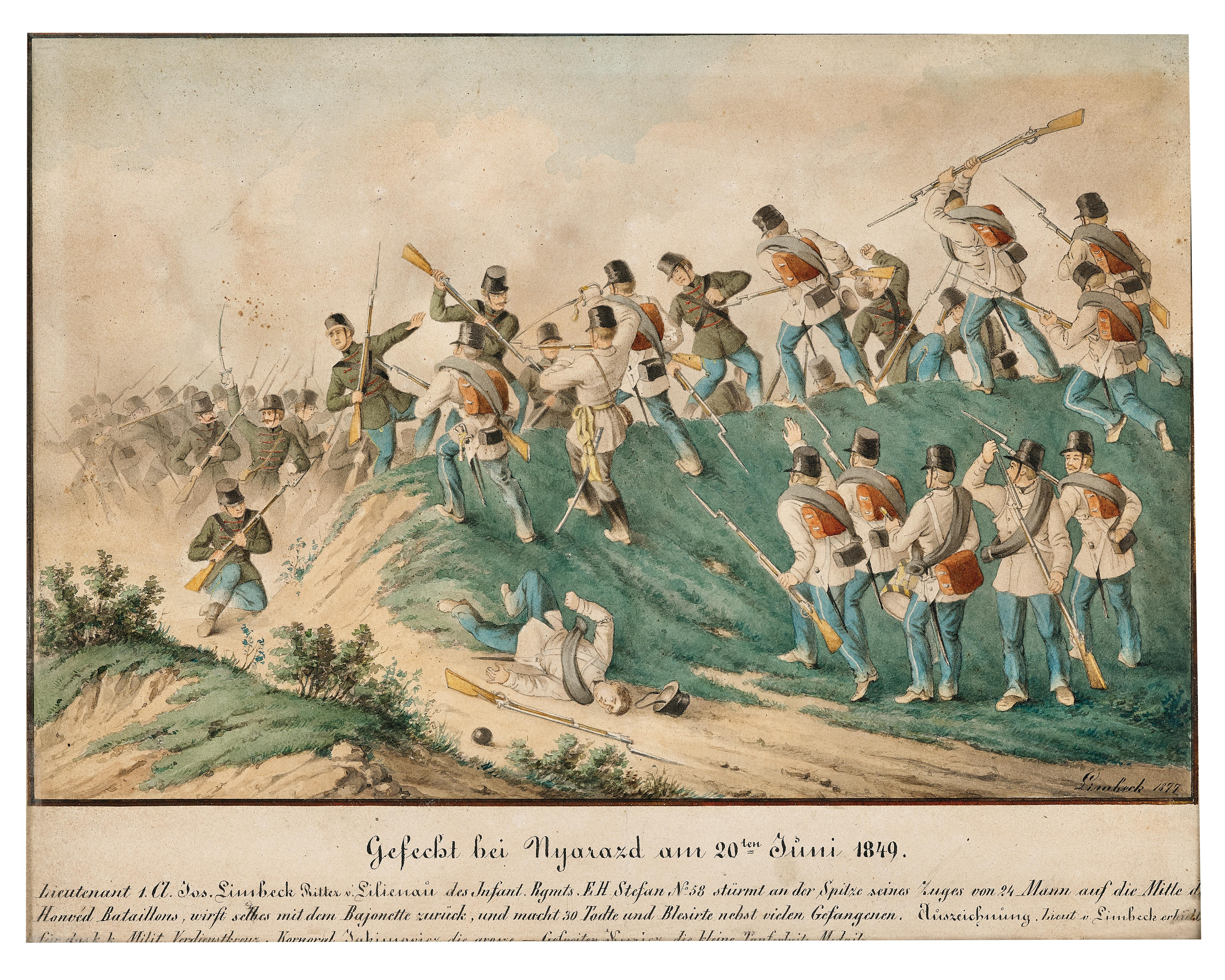
Battle of Alsónyárasd - 20 June 1849

However, the reinforcements hoped from southern Hungary did not arrive, so the Hungarian counter-offensive attempt along the Vág started with unfavorable signs. The operational plan was also rather complicated: it required the exact cooperation of the Hungarian corps lined up along the Vág, and if one of them did not demonstrate sufficient determination, the whole operation was threatened with failure. The likelihood of failure was also indicated by the fact that many highly experienced and talented Hungarian generals, who contributed to the victory in the Spring Campaign, were no longer present in the Hungarian army. General András Gáspár probably asked for his retirement because of the Hungarian Declaration of Independence, János Damjanich broke his leg at the end of April, György Klapka became at first deputy minister of war and then commander of Komárom, and Lajos Aulich was relieved of his troops because of illness. And the commanders who replaced them (Károly Knezich, József Nagysándor, and Lajos Asbóth) were not up to the task.

Field Marshal Julius Jacob von Haynau, who was appointed the third Imperial main commander of the K.u.K. armies since the beginning of Prince Windisch-Grätz's campaign against Hungary (if we do not count Jelačić's temporary command between Windisch-Grätz's resignation and Welden's arrival), replaced Ludwig von Welden dismissed for his failure against the Hungarians. Unlike his predecessors, he was a determined, resolute commander, ready to use any means necessary to achieve victory. The new commander-in-chief deployed the I and III Imperial Corps on the right bank of the Danube, while the II and IV (Reserve) Corps were deployed on the left bank. The Russian Panyutyin Brigade joined the latter corps.

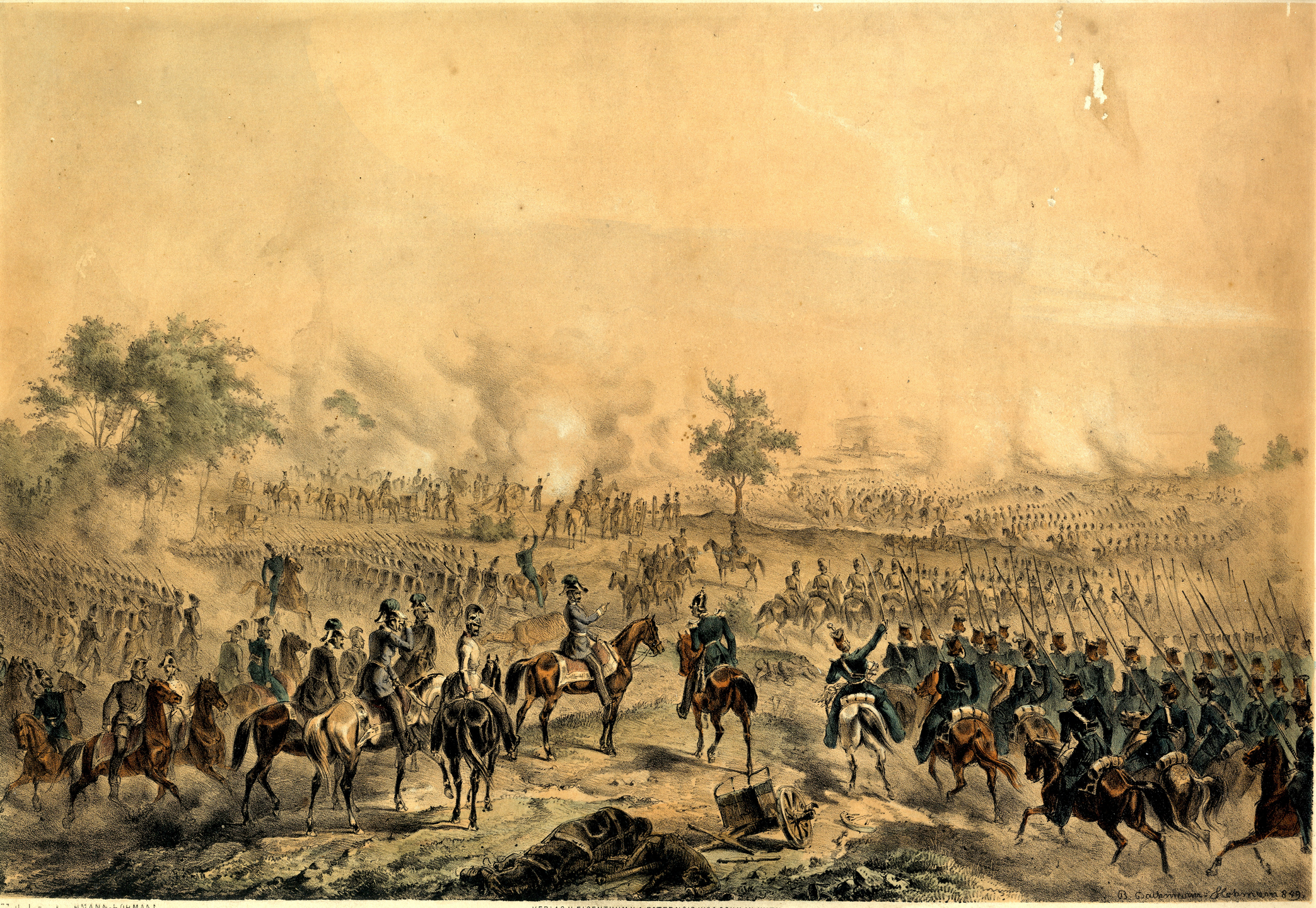
Battle of Pered on 20–21 June 1849 (Bachmann-Hohmann)

Nevertheless, the summer campaign began with Hungarian success. On 13 June, the Hungarian detachment deployed along the Rába, led by Colonel György Kmety, surprised the Austrian troops and inflicted a heavy defeat on them in the Battle of Csorna. In the battle, the commander of the Austrians, General Franz Wyss, was also killed in the battle. During those days, the Hungarians made several successful attacks on the right and left banks of the Danube and around the Vág, but these did not change the overwhelming superiority of the imperial armies.

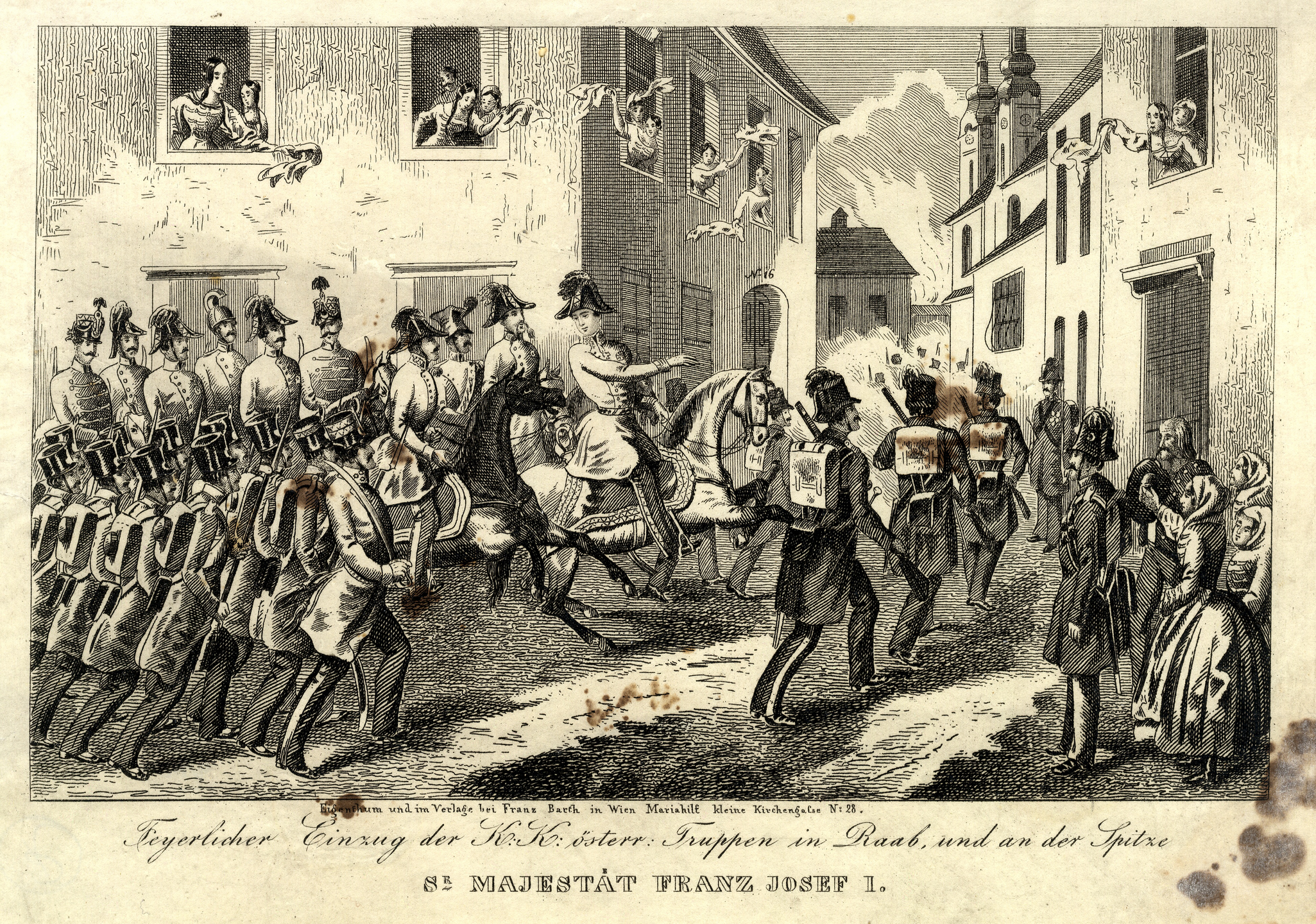
The Austrian troops enter in the occupied Győr led by emperor Franz Joseph on 28 June 1849

The Hungarian army then tried to make a breakthrough in the Vág region. On 16 June, Colonel Lajos Asbóth's II Corps launched an attack in the Zsigárd and Királyrév regions, but, after initial successes, the Battle of Zsigárd ended in defeat, because of the passivity of the other two corps commanders. Having learned of the failure, Görgei decided to repeat the attack on 20 June. On the first day of the Battle of Pered, Asbóth has once again done an excellent job. With his troops, he captured Királyréve, Zsigárd, and after several assaults, also Pered. But the other corps commanders failed. József Nagysándor and Károly Knezich did not show sufficient determination, while Klapka, was repulsed in the Battle of Alsónyárasd. Surprisingly, that evening the angry Görgei replaced the most successful officer, Lajos Asbóth. And, as could be expected, the next day, the numerically superior Austrian troops led by Lieutenant-General Wohlgemuth and the Russian Panyutyin division, which had been sent to support them, forced the Hungarian troops to retreat, and the Battle of Pered ended in defeat. Meanwhile, unbeknownst to the Hungarians, Haynau had redeployed his troops from the left bank of the Danube to the right bank, and the Hungarian attack along the Vág River, which resulted in the aforementioned defeat, was of great help in this, because it distracted the Hungarians. The Austrian victory, in which the Russian division led by Lieutenant General Feodor Sergeyevich Panyutyin played a major role, gave the impression that their main forces were still on the left bank, while Haynau was already preparing to attack Győr.

On 26 June Haynau's forces of almost 66 000 men attacked along the Rába line, and first, on 27 June, in the Battle of Ihász, they pushed the Kmety division towards Pápa, and on 28 June in the Battle of Győr, they forced General Ernő Poeltenberg's VII Corps and the troops sent to his aid, to retreat from the city. Artúr Görgei, who, because of his ministerial duties, arrived only at the end of the battle, risked his life at the head of the Hungarian Hussars to repulse the enemy's attacks, saving in this way his retreating troops from destruction.

=== The conflict between Kossuth and Görgei escalates ===
Even though the president of the National Defence Committee, Kossuth, had been hostile to Görgei since January because of the Declaration of Vác and because he suspected him as the initiator of the rebellion of Hungarian officers against Dembiński in Tiszafüred, the fact that he was with the army in the first part of the spring campaign, and the victories of Görgei in this campaign, had settled their differences, and the two became friends, and as a result of this, on 17 April Kossuth offered Görgei to be the new Minister of War.

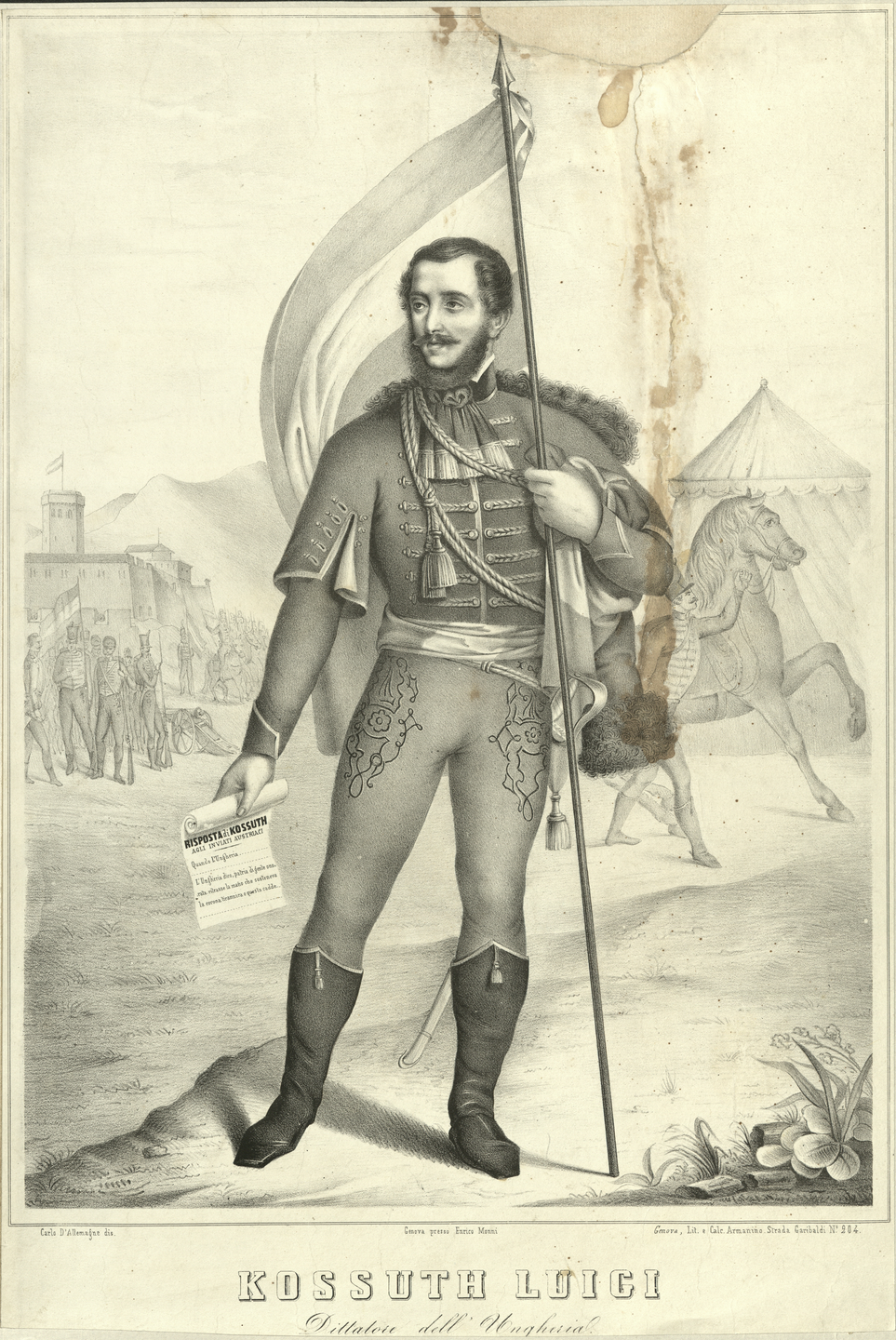
Kossuth the Governor of Hungary

However, their relationship started to deteriorate again at the end of April. Kossuth's political actions - above all the dethronement of the House of Habsburg - and his measures in matters concerning the army did not necessarily please the military leadership. Görgei believed that the Russian invasion was caused by the Declaration of Independence (Görgei was wrong, however, because the Russian invasion had already been agreed between the Habsburgs and the Russians before the dethronement). He blamed Kossuth for this, and believed that if Kossuth and those politicians who were in favor of the independence were removed from power, the Russian invasion could be avoided, and a deal could be negotiated with the Habsburgs, at the cost of Hungary's renewed recognition of the Habsburg monarch as its king, in return for the king's recognition of the April 1848 laws (i.e. Hungary's autonomy). This dislike was perhaps also signaled by the fact that when, after the recapture of Buda, Kossuth offered him the Royal Palace of Gödöllő as a "gift of the nation" and then his promotion to lieutenant-general, Görgei refused both. At the same time, Görgei contacted the so-called Hungarian Peace Party, which, like him, did not agree with the dethronement. Görgei told them that he was prepared to use the military to overthrow Kossuth's government in order to have the Declaration of Independence revoked, but the Peace Party did not agree, and Görgei left the meeting. Kossuth, however, had learned of Görgei's meeting with the Peace Party and wanted to remove Görgei from his position as head of the Hungarian army, but would have allowed him to keep his position as Minister of War.

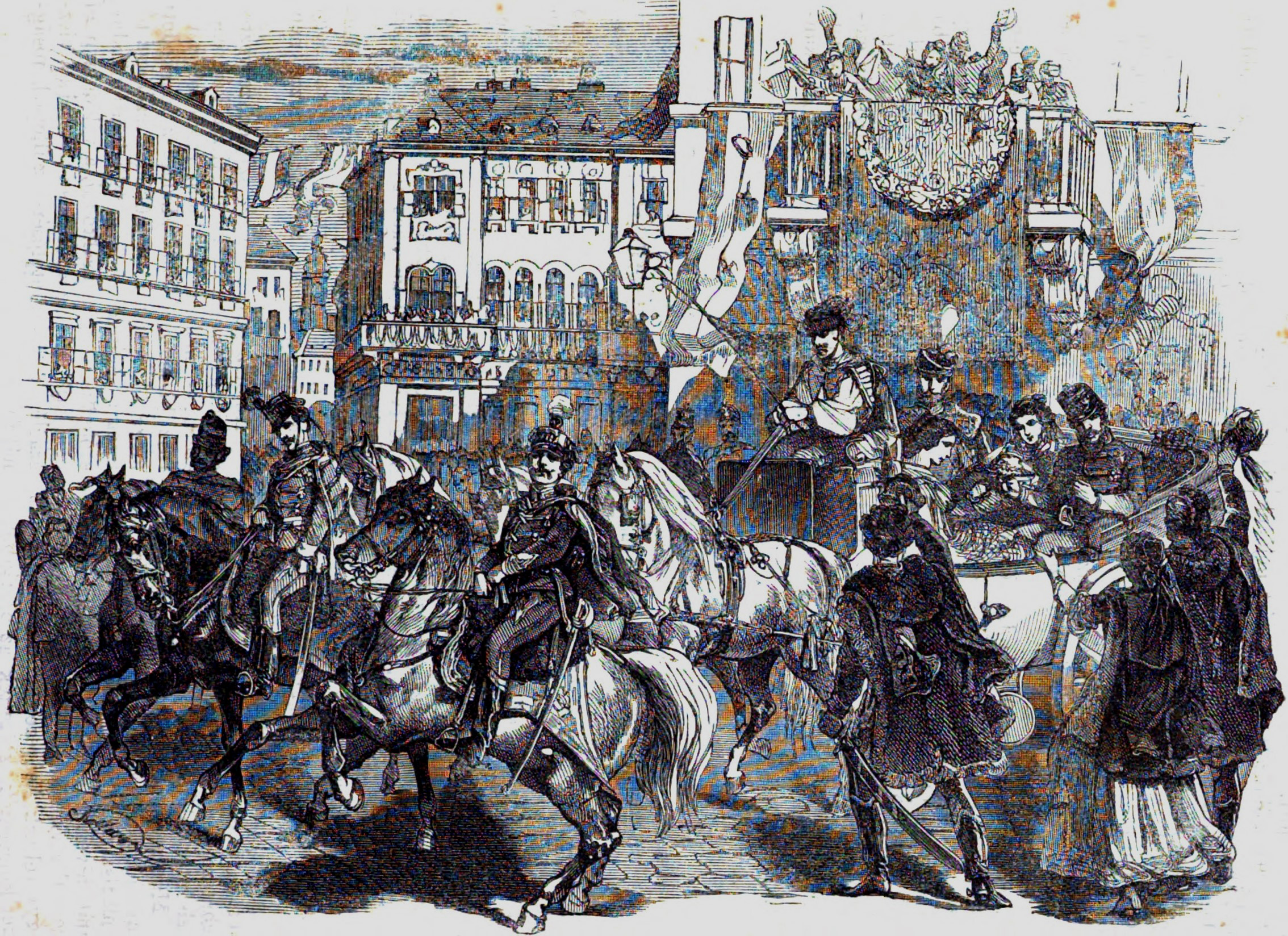
Kossuth and his family being welcomed by the population in the liberated Buda and Pest

Due to the escalating fighting, Görgei was unable to carry out his duties as minister and commander-in-chief at the same time. In practice, this meant that he had to commute between the army headquarters and the capital, which meant the road between Komárom and Pest. As a consequence, as mentioned above, he was absent from the Battle of Zsigárd and the first day of the Battle of Pered, and when he appeared on the second day of the latter battle, he was unable to appreciate the situation that had developed in the meantime and therefore lost both battles.

At the Council of Ministers meeting on 26 June 1849, on Görgei's proposal, the following operational plan was accepted. Since there was no possibility of attacking or defending successfully on all fronts, the troops would have to be concentrated in two strategical points. One of the groupings, representing the main army, should be united in the area of Komárom. The task of Wysocki's IX Corps would have remained the same: to hold back or slow off the advance of the Russian main force. The other grouping would have consisted of the Hungarian forces of Bácska, Banat, and Transylvania, as well as Lajos Kazinczy's detached division. This grouping's task would have been to take up a position along the Tisza, with Nagyvárad as its center. Its task would have been to defend the Tisza line, defend Banat, and capture the two fortresses (Temesvár and Arad) still in enemy hands. The decision therefore envisaged a two-centred concentration. Its most essential element was to attack Austria.

However, on 29 June, the Council of Ministers reconsidered the decision of 26 June. The Minister of War, without Görgei's knowledge, decided to abandon the plan of concentration around Komárom, and Görgei's, Bem's troops and Wysocki's troops were all ordered to Szeged, in order to ensure the success of the operations against Jelačić. The fact that this new operational plan was taken without the knowledge of the minister of war, by abandoning his own plan agreed earlier, insulted Görgei's dignity, and seriously damaged his authority as Minister of War. In Komárom, only a garrison of about 15,000 was planned to be left behind. According to this new operation plan made by Dembiński, the Kmety division also was to be sent to southern Hungary through Baja. So the Council of Ministers decided to concentrate all troops in southern Hungary, abandoning the rest of Hungary to the enemy.

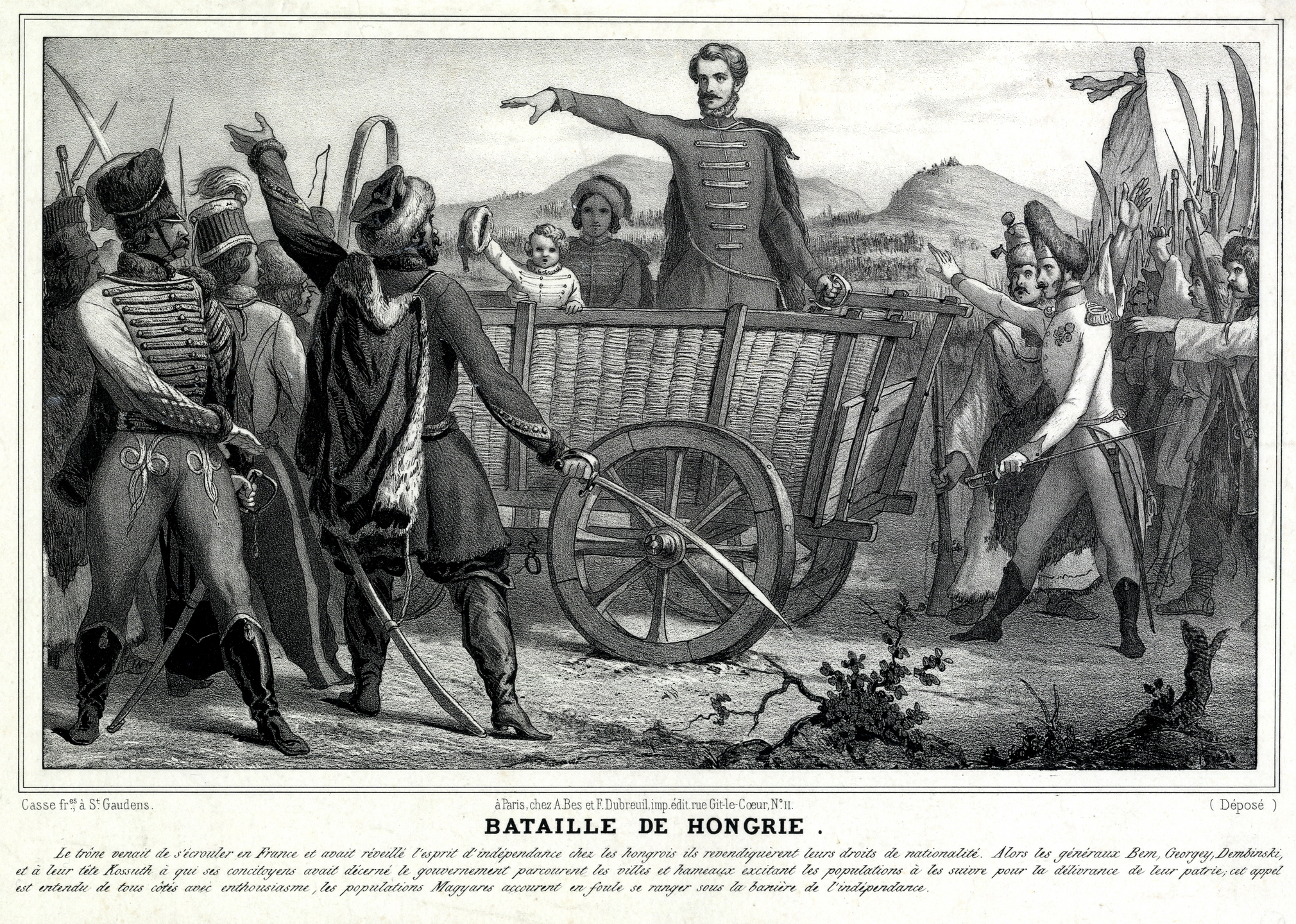
Kossuth among the soldiers (1849)

From a military point of view, Görgei's plan was the better one. As long as Komárom, one of the best fortifications of the Habsburg Empire, was in Hungarian hands, the imperial army could not ignore it. With the concentration of the forces at Komárom, the Hungarian forces would have had two weeks to try to inflict a decisive defeat on Haynau's army. Dembiński's Szeged concentration plan, however, meant that the Hungarian army would have drawn against the Hungarian army the concentrated attack of the Russian and the K.u.K. main armies, the result of which would have been certainly a catastrophe for the Hungarians.

Görgei on 30 June, before learning of the plan of the concentration at Szeged, wrote to Kossuth a letter to inform him that he intended to continue to operate in the spirit of the Komárom concentration plan and that he had not changed his mind because of the defeat of Győr. However, when the delegation with the new war plan arrived on the same day, although it was humiliating to him, and he disagreed with it, he verbally promised to obey this decision. Görgei's letter written before the arrival of the delegation, however, was delivered to Kossuth after the delegation returned, and informed him that the commander accepted to march to Szeged, so Kossuth received the two messages in reverse order. The governor-president, therefore, believed that the main commander had withdrawn his verbal promise to the delegation, thus he had disobeyed Kossuth's and the Council of Ministers' orders to concentrate in Szeged, classifying this as a rebellion against their authority, therefore he dismissed Görgei from the high command, and he sent immediately Lieutenant General Lázár Mészáros to Komárom, to take over the leadership of the Hungarian army.

=== Battles around Komárom ===
In the meantime, the Imperial Army after occupying Győr, began to advance towards Komárom, where the Hungarian troops retreated. Field Marshal Julius von Haynau ordered his troops to launch a general attack on 2 July.

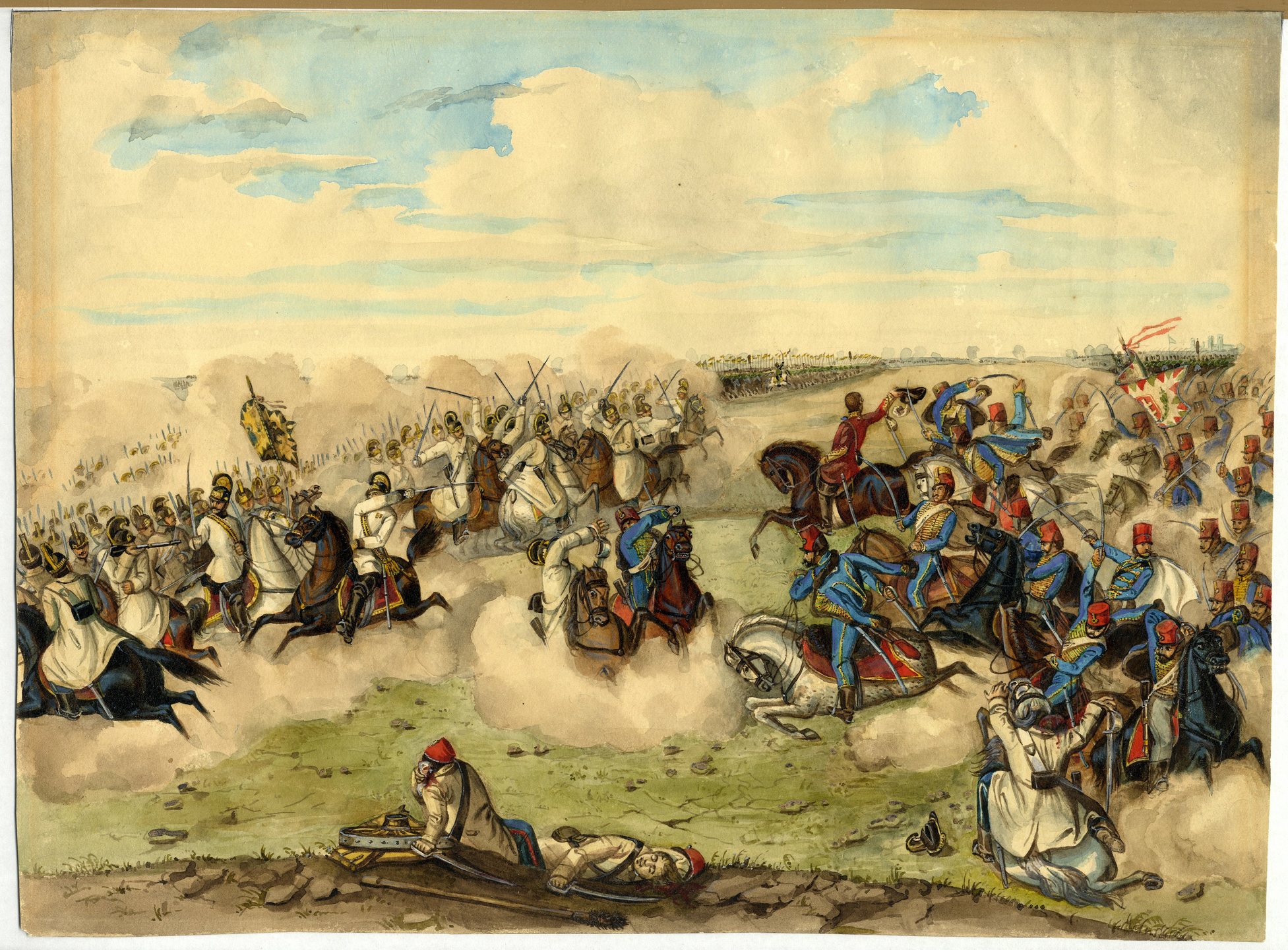
Battle of Komárom on 2 July (the cavalry skirmish at Ószőny), General Görgei, leading the hussars is wounded - Than Mór

In the first part of the Second Battle of Komárom, the imperial army of 52 000 soldiers forced the Hungarian troops numbering 26 000 men to flee, but Görgei counter-attacked and forced Haynau's troops to retreat. Towards the end of the battle, Görgei, who was personally leading the charge of the Hungarian cavalry, suffered a severe head wound from an enemy shell, which left him unconscious and unable to serve for days. The second Battle of Komárom proved that, despite the enemy's twice superior numbers, under a talented and determined leadership, the young Hungarian army could successfully stand against the main army of one of the Habsburg Empire, one of the strongest states in Europe.

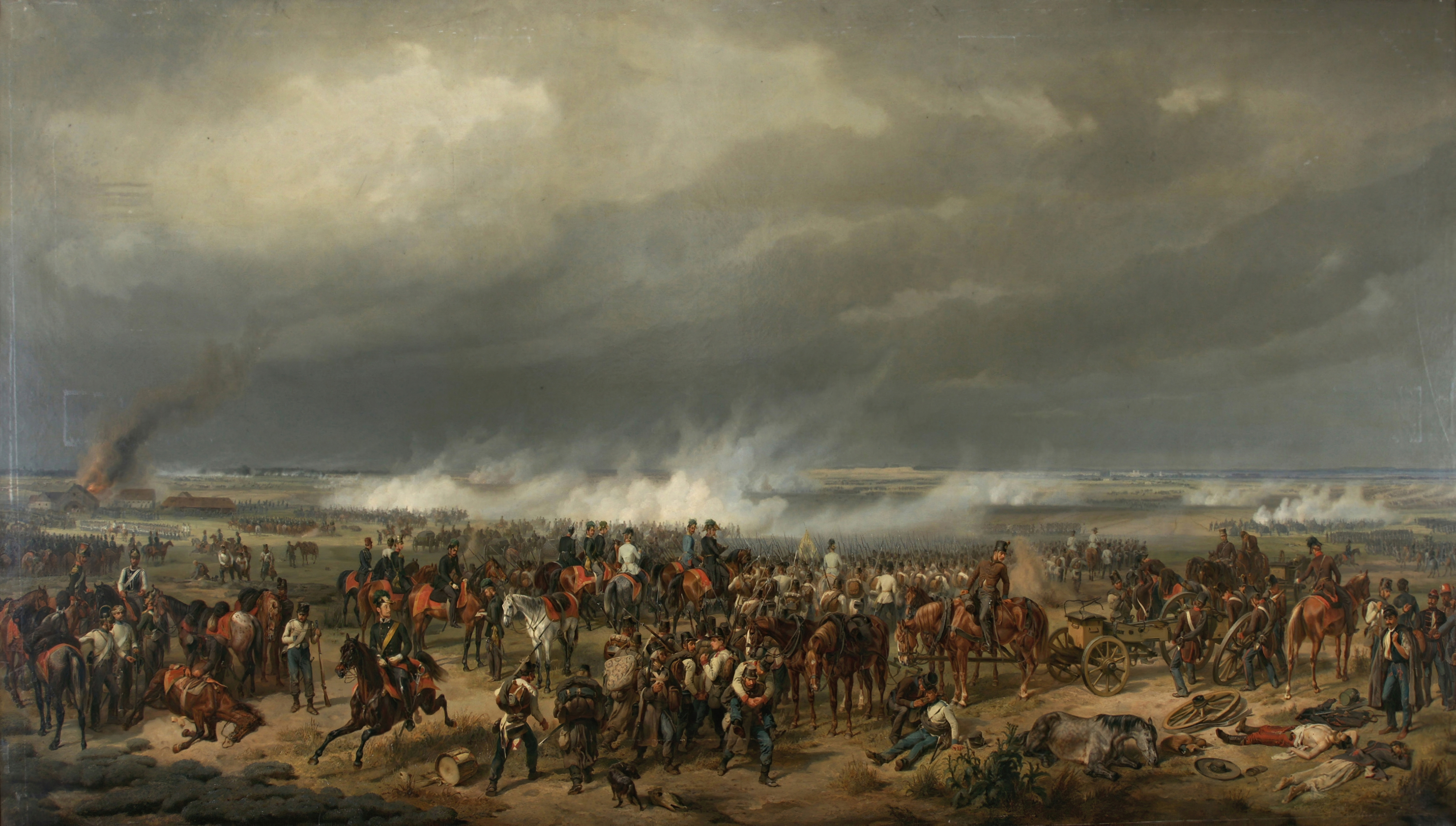
Battle of Komárom (11 July 1849) by Albrecht Adam

After the battle, the order to replace Görgei and to appoint the unskilled Lt. Gen. Lázár Mészáros arrived in Komárom. This news deeply upset the Hungarian officers, who still considered Görgei the most capable Hungarian commander. They sent Generals József Nagysándor and György Klapka to Pest, where the officers' protest was handed over to Kossuth, who was forced to temporarily reinstate Görgeit as commander of the Upper Danube Army and let him lead the troops' withdrawal to southern Hungary.

After the battle, because Görgei was unconscious, he could not fulfill the order of the Council of Ministers on 29 June, by leading the army to Szeged, so this was delayed for several days. So the Hungarian generals decided to use this time to try to break the Austrian encirclement around Komárom on the right bank of the Danube installed by Haynau, and then to retreat towards Szeged.

Since Görgei was not yet fully fit for service, on 11 July 1849 the Hungarian army led by Klapka attempted to break through the encirclement of the imperial troops on the right bank of the Danube. However, due to the lack of cooperation between the Hungarian troops, the Third Battle of Komárom ended in defeat.

=== Görgei’s troops’ march towards southern Hungary ===
Because, as a result of the defeat on 11 July, the imperial army was blocking the way on the right bank of the Danube, on 12-13 Görgei's troops started their march towards Pest on the left bank of the river, to

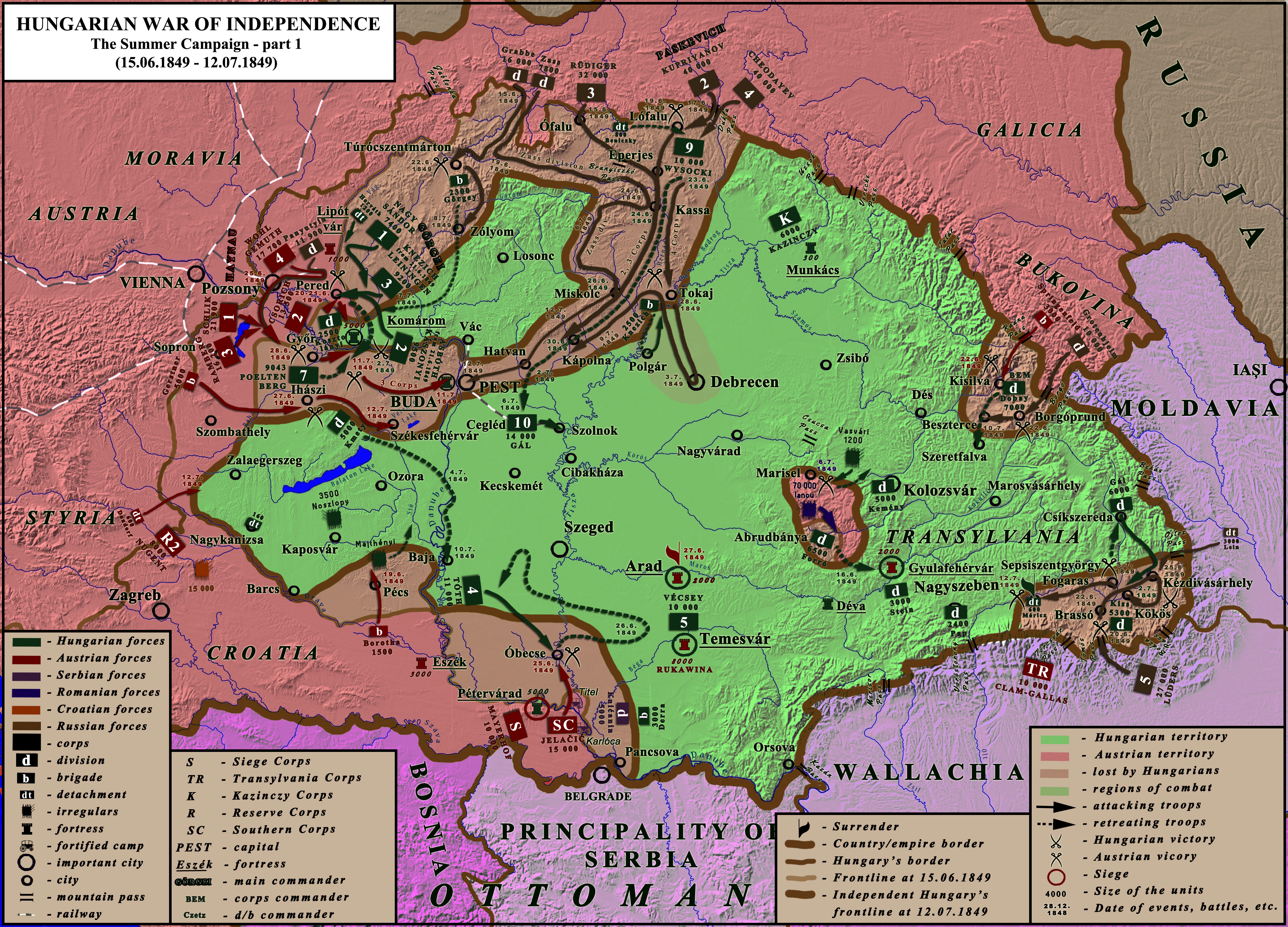
The Military Situation in Hungary between 15.06.1849 and 12.07.1849

join the Hungarian forces concentrating in the South. On the way, however, they encountered the vanguard of the Russian main army South of Vác. On 15 July, the first day of the Second Battle of Vác, Görgei's troops drove out the Cossacks from the city. In the afternoon, more Russian troops appeared in front of Vác and tried to push out the Hungarians from the city, but they were repulsed. Now Görgei knew that there were significant Russian forces south and southeast of Vác, and that was almost hopeless to break through them towards the South, so he decided to take a long detour to the northeast, drawing Field Marshal Paskevich's Russian main army after him, preventing it in this way to attack the Hungarian troops concentrating at Szeged. The retreat began on the evening of 16 July, and on 17 the Hungarian troops fought their way northeastwards in heavy fighting. Thus, after the repulse of the Habsburg Imperial Army led by Haynau at the Battle of Komárom on 2 July, Görgei this time achieved strategic success against the Russian army led by General Paskevich, which had twice the numerical superiority.

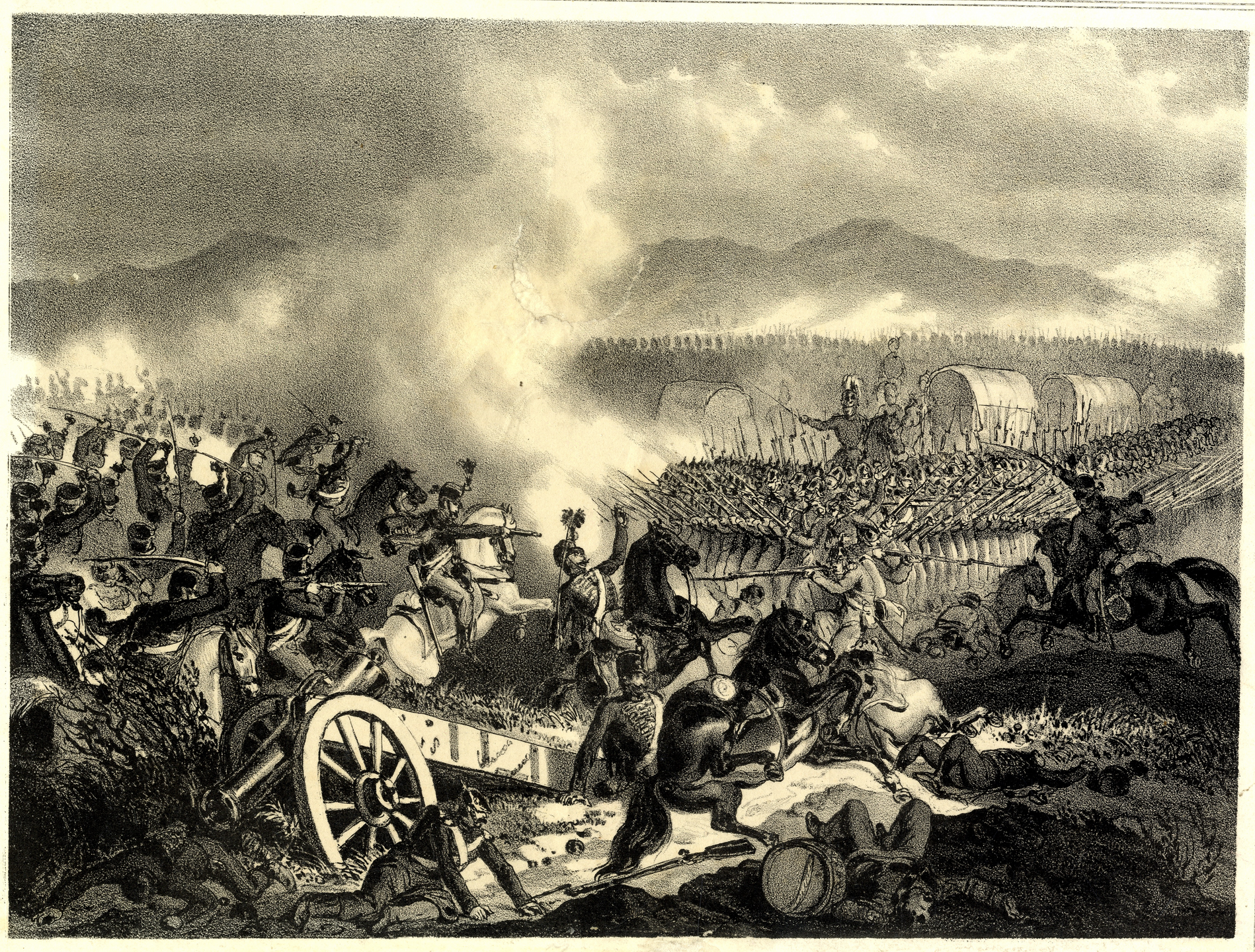
Battle of Váci, 15–17 July 1849 - Gerhart H

On 20 July General Mór Perczel's cavalry attacked the Russians from the side, and although, due to the intervention in the battle of the overwhelming Russian infantry, the Battle of Tura ended in a Hungarian withdrawal. Perczel's attack also played a role in Paskevich's failure to pursue Görgei with all his strength.

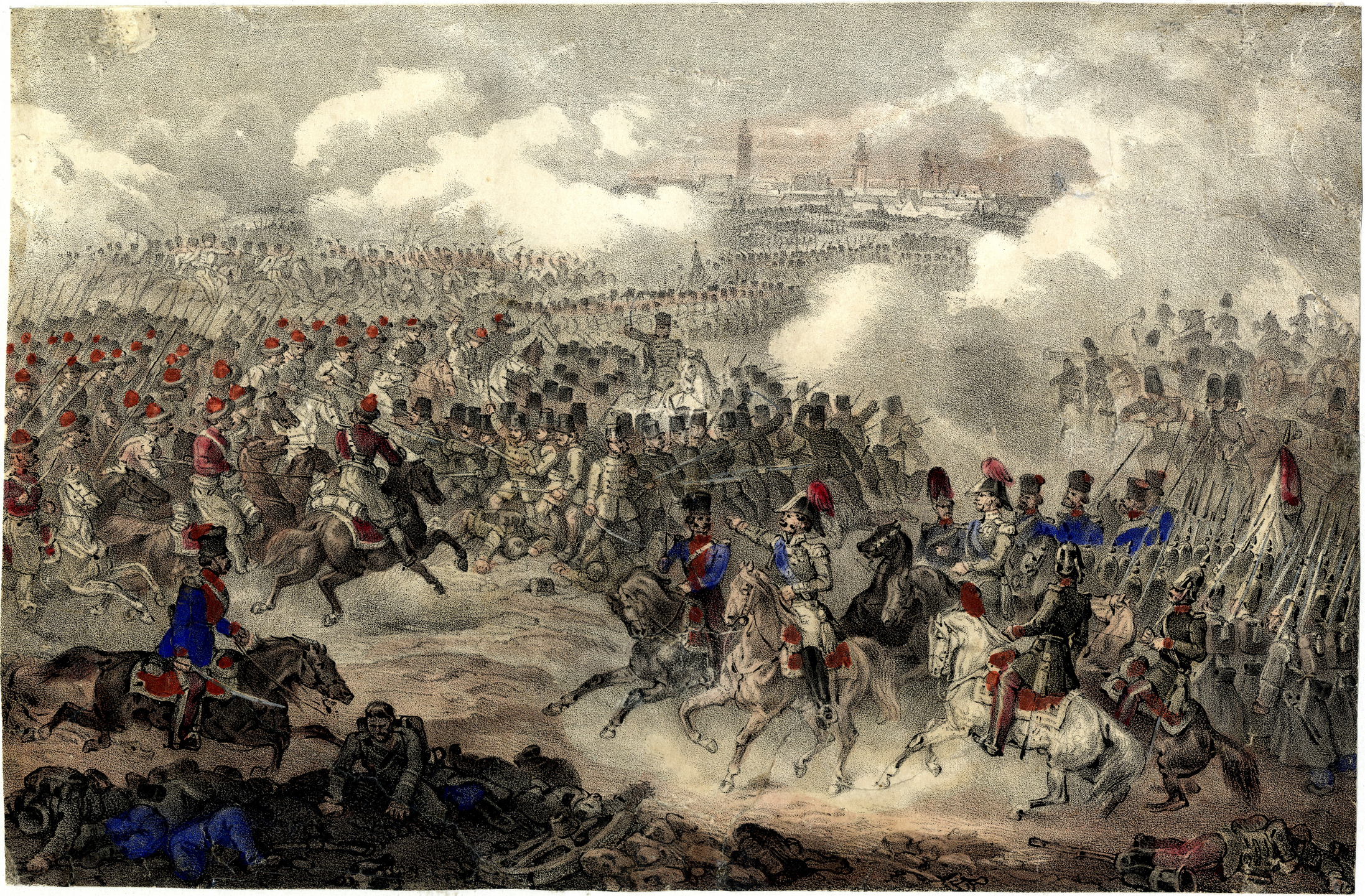
Battle of Debrecen, 2 August 1849

Görgei's retreat in northern Hungary threatened the Russian army's supply lines, so Paskevich, instead of marching south to link up with Haynau's Imperial Army, sent his corps after Görgei, delaying the end of the war for weeks. Now the Army of the Upper Danube marched towards Miskolc and fought successful defensive battles with the Russian IV Corps in the Battle of Görömböly on 24 July and the Battle of Zsolca on 25 July. Görgei, being informed on the 27th, that the Russians had crossed the Tisza at Poroszló, ordered his troops to march towards the river at an accelerated pace. However, before his troops reached the Tisza, on the 28th Károly Leiningen-Westerburg's III Corps repulsed Lieutenant-General Pavel Grabbe's numerically superior Russian detachment in the Battle of Gesztely. On the 29th Görgei crossed the Tisza at Tokaj and headed for Arad.

Görgei finally reached the Tisza with a long detour. He reached every destination of his march before the Russians and with one-sixth of the Hungarian army he had tied up one-third of the Austro-Russian intervention forces, four times his own. The Tsar himself wondered how Görgei's 30,000 men could outsmart Paskevich's 120,000 soldiers.

Görgei divided his army in Nyíregyháza on 30 July and marched towards Arad. In the Battle of Debrecen from 2 August 1849, General József Nagysándor, the commander of one of the columns, recklessly engaged in battle with the Russian main force outnumbering his troops seven to one, and suffered a serious defeat.

After the battle of Debrecen, however, the Russian forces remained several days behind the Army of the Upper Danube which was marching towards Arad, so if the Army of the South led by Henryk Dembiński and Görgei's Army had joined their forces, they could destroy Haynau's imperial army before the Russians arrived.

== Battles in Transylvania ==
=== The campaign in the mountains ===
In Transylvania, Bem gathered some 39,000 Hungarian soldiers and 107 guns against 53,000 soldiers and 133 guns of the Russian and Austrian intervention forces.

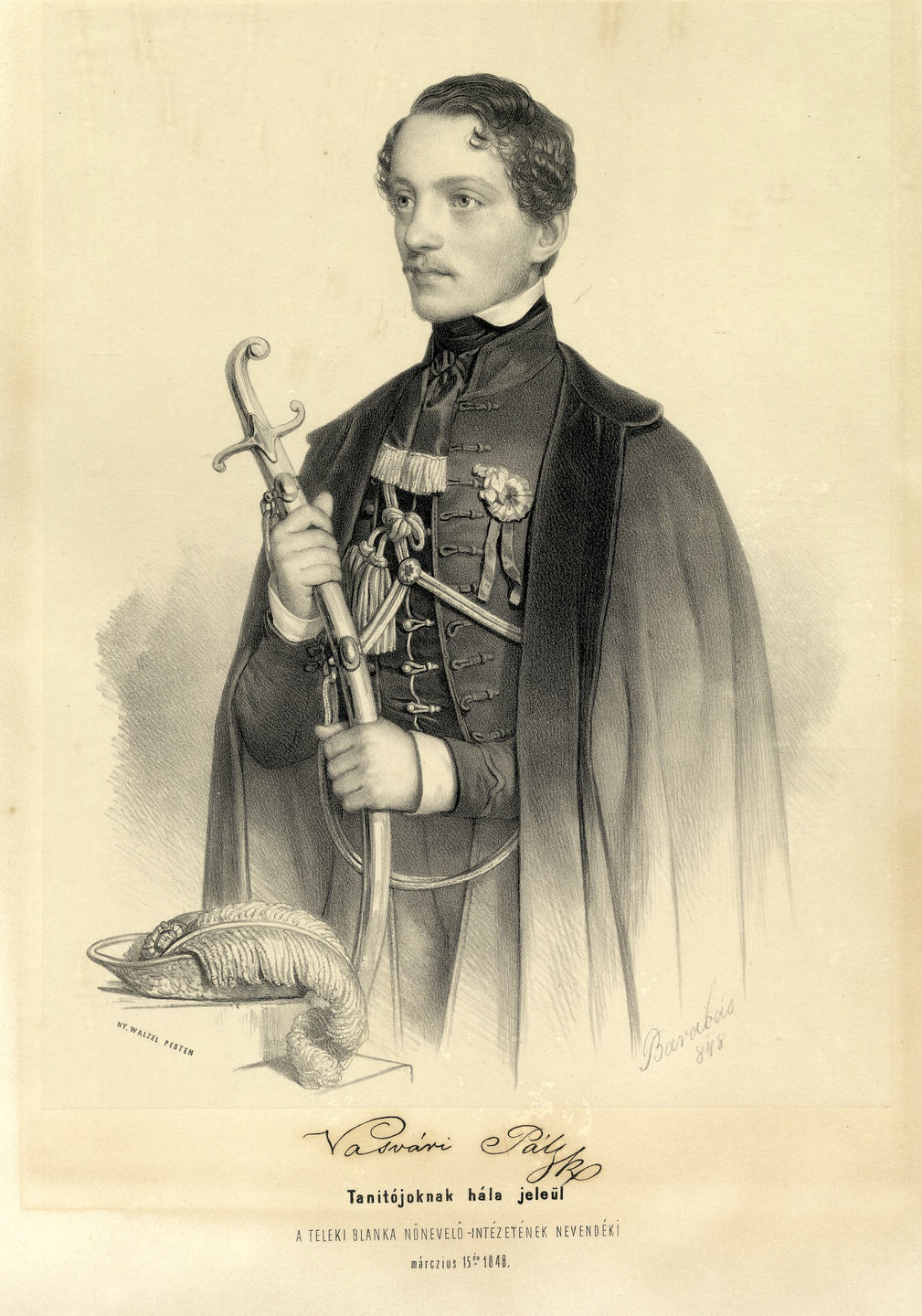
Vasvári Pál (1826–1849) - Barabás Miklós

But the best of Bem's soldiers were deployed to watch the Romanians from the Transylvanian Ore Mountains mountains, to encircle Gyulafehérvár, and to guard Banat. Most of the troops on the borders threatened by the Russian invasion were poorly equipped recruits. Meanwhile, at the beginning of June, Bem sent Colonel Farkas Kemény with 5000 soldiers against Avram Iancu's troops in the mountains, but the attack, carried out without sufficient force, against the numerically overwhelming Romanians (according to Kemény there were 10 000 riflemen and 60 000 spearmen) who were using guerilla tactics, fizzled out by 16 June and Kemény was forced to retreat. As a result, on the eve of the Russian intervention, the insurgents continued to tie down a significant part of the Hungarian forces in Transylvania. At the beginning of July, the army troops camped around the Ore Mountains, prepared for another attack on Bem's orders, but it was soon called off or postponed. However, the decision did not reach the Rákóczi Volunteer Troop led by Pál Vasvári, which was surrounded by Romanian rebels at Havasnagyfalu on 5 and 6 July and was wiped out. In the bloody clash, the commander himself was killed. At the same time, the Romanians too tried to break out of the mountains and attack the villages and towns near them. On 9 June a Romanian militia troop of about 4000 men attacked the Hungarian units consisting of 1170 men led by Major István Csanády, but the Romanians were put to flight in the Battle of Nagyhalmágy. In the end, thanks to the help of the Romanian revolutionaries from Wallachia, at the beginning of August, Avram Iancu promised that he would not attack the Hungarians if they too would refrain from attacking the Romanians.

=== The start of the Russo-Austrian invasion against Transylvania ===
Being certain about the imminency of the intervention, Bem knew that if he, with his inferior and rookie troops, engaged in a decisive battle against the Russian-Austrian troops, his army could easily be destroyed. He, therefore, decided to spread his troops along the border and to constantly move from one division to another, by leading continuous attacks against the enemy to prevent the Russo-Austrian forces from entering the Great Hungarian Plain and to protect from enemy occupation his main base of operations, the Székely Land.

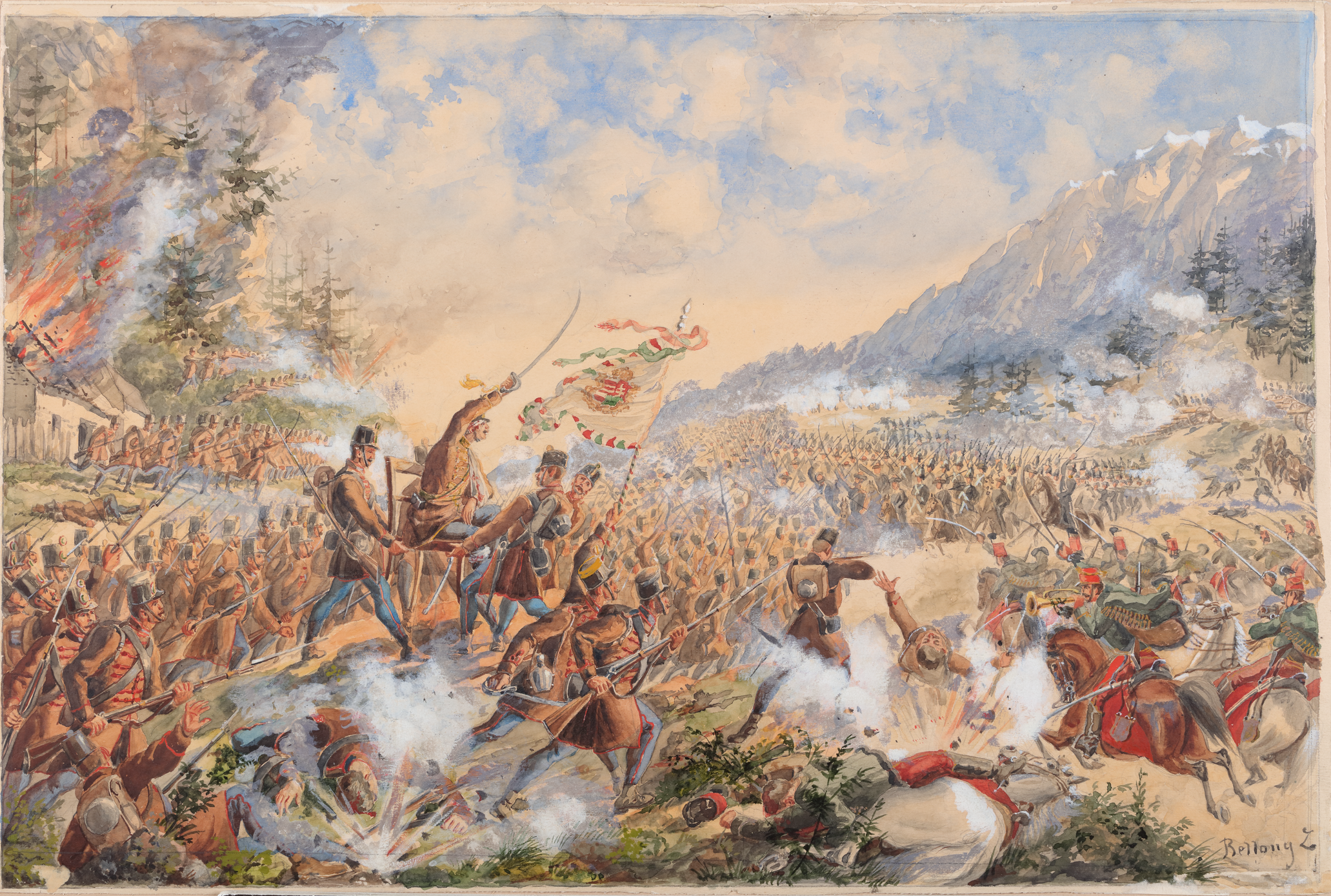
Battle of Tömös Pass (20 June 1849) - László Bellony. Honvéd Despite being wounded, Colonel Sándor Kiss with his troops tries to stop the overwhelming Russian forces to break into Transylvania

On 19–20 June, Alexander von Lüders' main Russian force broke through the Tömös Pass, defeated in the Battle of Tömös the Hungarian division which was defending the Strait, and occupied Brassó the same day. After the capture of Brassó, Lüders sent a 9,000-strong brigade into Székely Land, which defeated part of the Székely division on 23 June.

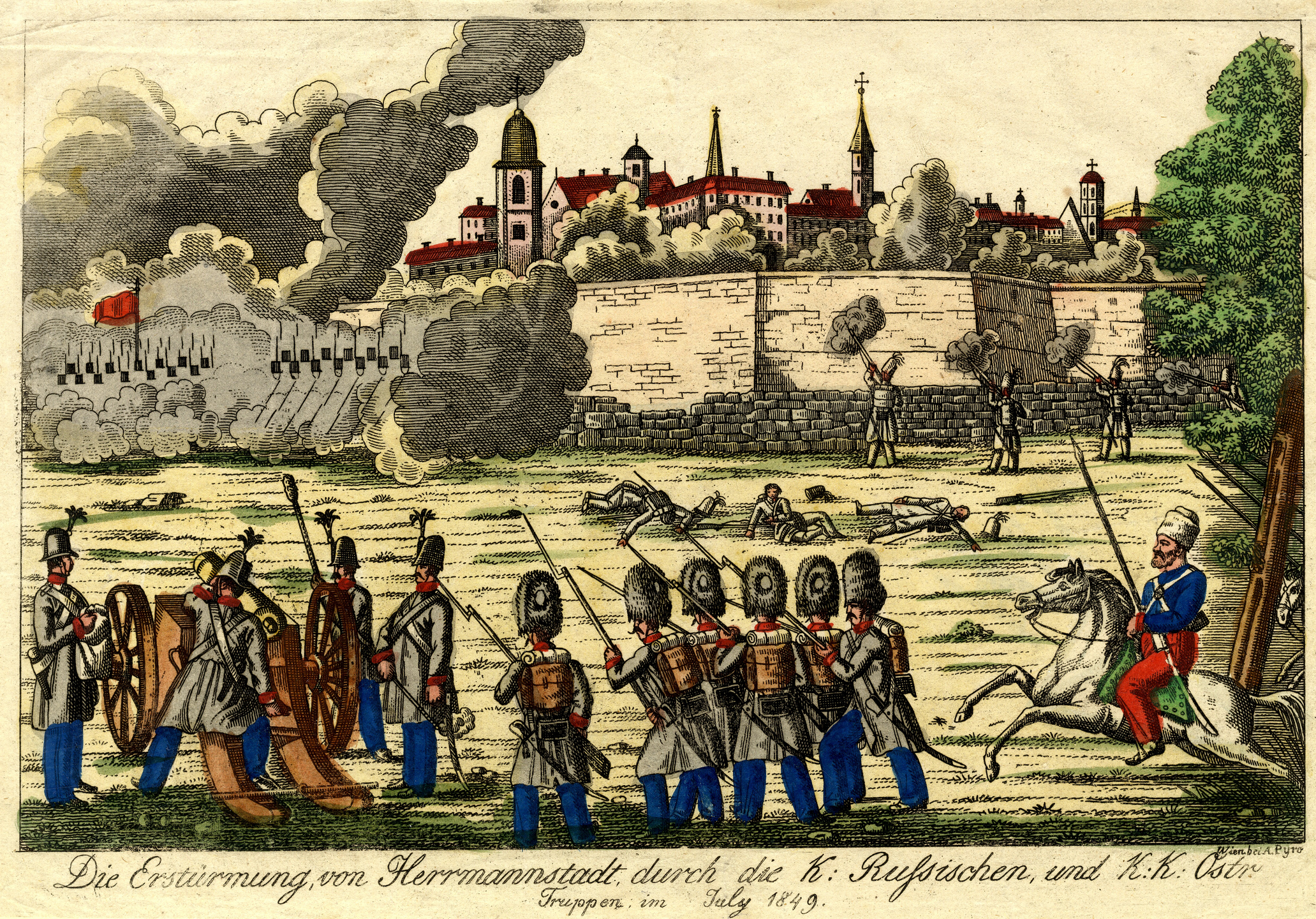
Russian and Austrian troops attacking Nagyszeben on 21 July 1849

Lüders then moved his troops towards Nagyszeben, to capture the city and chase away the Hungarian troops defending the Vöröstorony through which the Imperial Corps led by Eduard Clam-Gallas was preparing to invade Transylvania. Lüders defeated a brigade of the Nagyszeben division in the Battle of Fogaras on 13 July and the other in the Battle of Fenyőfalva on 18 July, after which the Hungarian division evacuated Nagyszeben and retreated to Székely Land. The Hungarian garrison defending the Vöröstorony Pass was attacked on 20 July by Lüders' troops and pushed into Wallachia. The detachment laid down their arms in front of the Turkish troops stationed there.

On 20 June, the Russian division led by General Magnus Johann von Grotenhjelm entered Transylvania through the Borgó and Radna passes. After two defeats, Lieutenant Colonel József Dobay, who was in charge of the defence, gave up Beszterce and retreated as far as Dés. On 24 June, however, Bem took command of the division from Dobay. He occupied Beszterce and then attacked Grotenhjelm. On 27 June Grotenhjelm repulsed the attack in the Battle of Jád and on the 28th he drove the Hungarian army back to Szeretfalva. After the victory, however, Grotenhjelm returned to the foothills of the Borgó Strait, and Bem could reoccupy Beszterce on July 1.

On 10 July Grotenhjelm attacked the Hungarian troops, but after the victory in the Battle of Beszterce, he retreated again to the foreground of the Borgó Pass. After this, Bem handed over command of the Beszterce division to Colonel György Damaszkin. On 16 July, Grotenhjelm attacked again, and in the Battle of Szeretfalva pushed the Damaszkin's division towards Szászrégen, and then returned to Beszterce. On 21 July, Colonel Damaszkin made a weak attempt to attack, but then retreated again as far as Szászrégen. On 23 July, Grotenhjelm's much superior army attacked and defeated Damaszkin's 3000 soldiers in the Battle of Szászrégen, but the delay of the Russian encircling column allowed the Hungarians to leave the battlefield without serious losses.

=== Fights in Székely Land and Moldavia ===
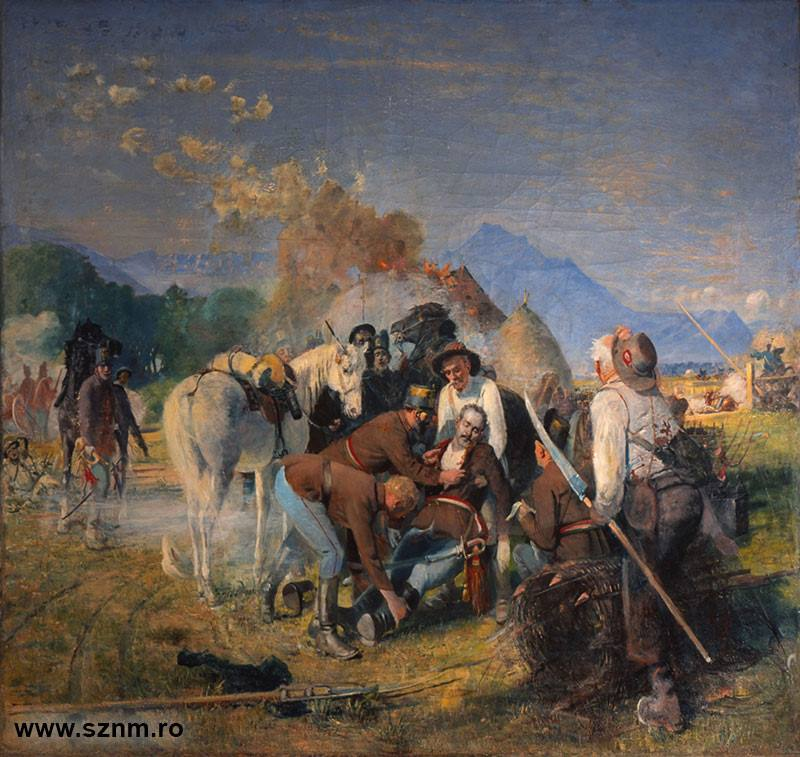
Death of Áron Gábor in the Second Battle of Kökös (2 July 1849) - by Jenő Gyárfás

On July 2, in the Second Battle of Kökös, the Székely division led by Colonel Sándor Gál repelled the attack of the Russian troops led by General Hasford. However, the Székelys had a great loss in the death in this battle of Major Áron Gábor, the founder of the cannon production in Háromszék and the artillery commander of the Székely Land division. On the news of the outcome of this battle, General Lüders turned back from Nagyszeben and pushed into Székely Land, and on 5 July he attacked Colonel Sándor Gál's division and defeated it in the Battle of Sepsiszentgyörgy after which the Hungarians retreated to Csíkszereda.

On 20–21 July, Bem attacked and drove Clam-Gallas' corps out of Székely Land in several battles, and on 23 July he invaded Moldavia through the Oituz Pass. He took some 2,000 troops to this diversion, and in the Battle of Grozești, he defeated the Russian forces left behind in Moldavia, advancing as far as Onești and Târgu Ocna. During his incursion, he issued a manifesto calling on the Romanian population to rise against the Russian occupation, but it had little effect. So on 25 July, he turned back to Transylvania.

=== Bem’s defeat in Transylvania ===
Bem was confronted on 31 July by Lüders' Russian army in the Battle of Segesvár. In a battle with an overwhelmingly superior enemy forces, in the beginning of which Russian General Grigory Skaryatyn lost his life, Bem was defeated and almost fell in the hands of the pursuers. The poet of the revolution, Major Sándor Petőfi, died at the end of the battle.

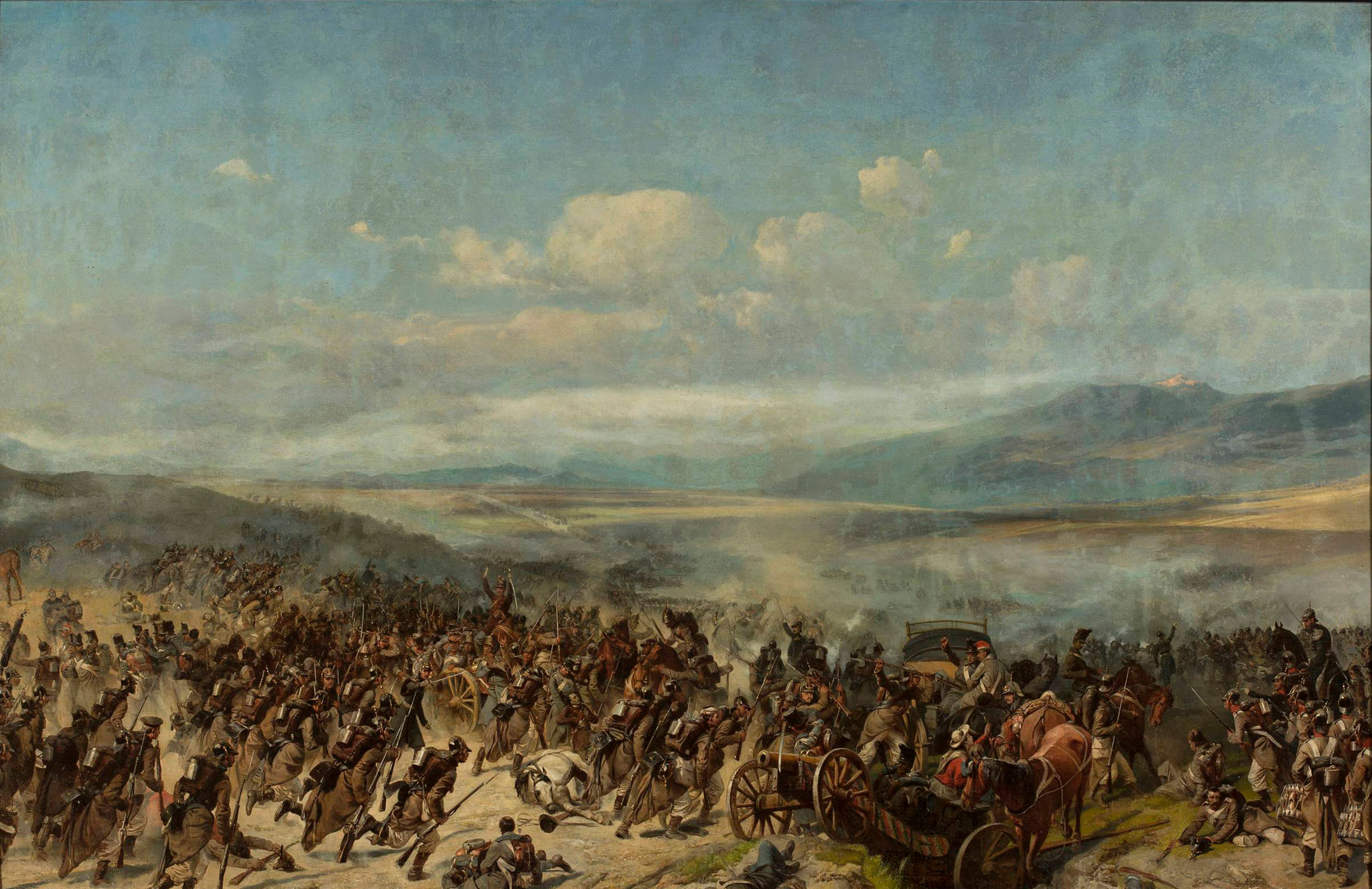
Battle of Segesvár 31 July 1849 Bogdan Willewalde

On August 1, Clam-Gallas's imperial corps defeated Gál Sándor's army of 6000 men in the Battle of Bükszád, and on August 2, he captured Csíkszereda, while Grotenhjelm captured Marosvásárhely. Gál's army reduced to 1100 men, retreated to Székelyudvarhely and from there to Kolozsvár.

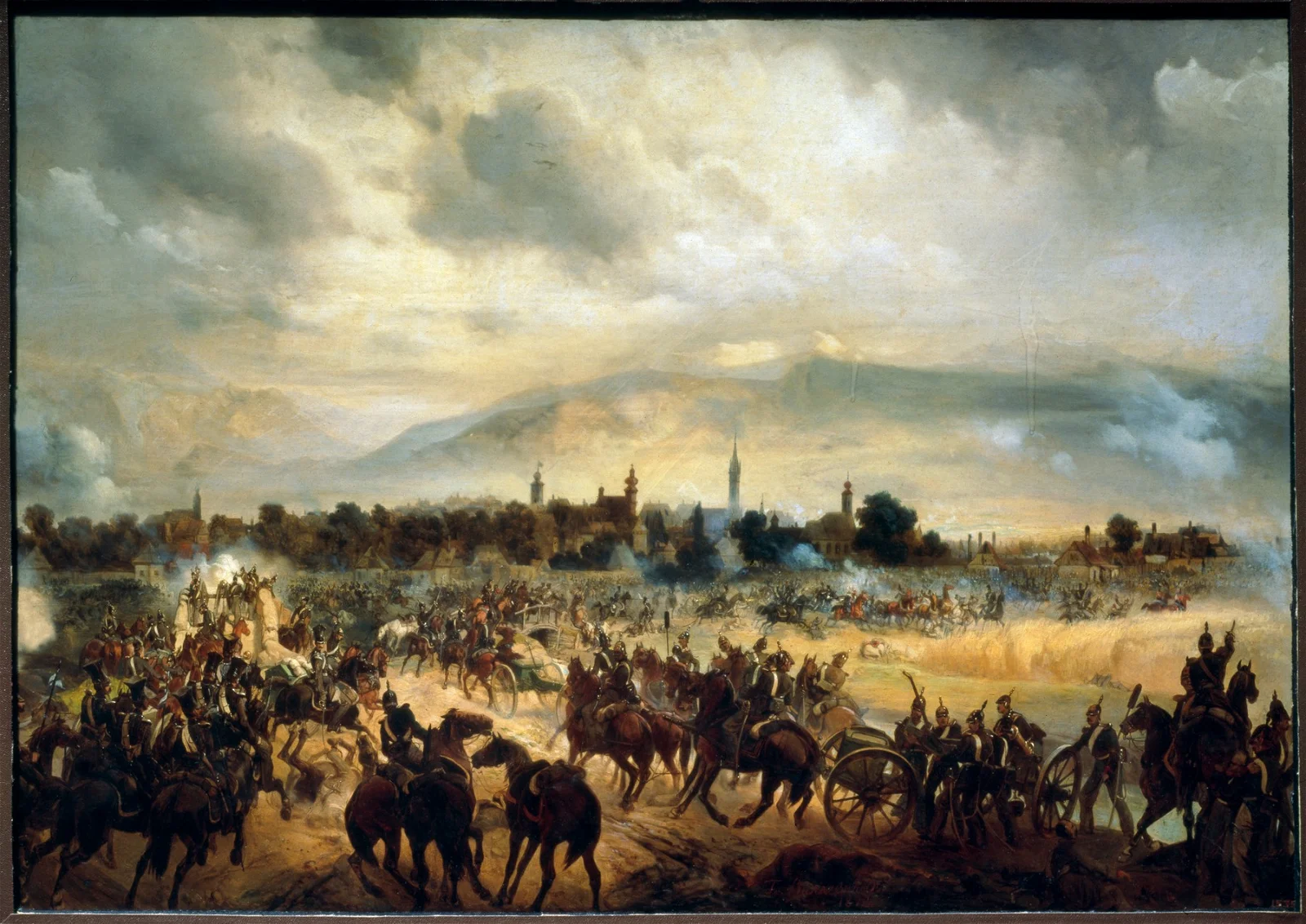
Battle of Nagyszeben (Bogdan Willevalde 1872)

Meanwhile, a few days after his defeat at Segesvár, Bem was already on his way, and on 5 August, behind Lüders back, as a result of the Third Battle of Nagyszeben, he again captured the city, repeating his feat of 11 March 1849. This forced the Russians heading towards Székely Land to turn back. But on 6 August, Lüders arrived with his troops at Nagyszeben, and in the Battle of Nagycsűr, they crushed Bem's troops despite their heroic defense, inflicting a decisive defeat on them. This was Bem's last battle in Transylvania. The remaining troops fled towards Déva, while Bem hurried to Hungary because Kossuth had entrusted him with the command of the main army.

If we want to conclude Józef Bem's performance in the Summer Campaign as the commander of the Army of Transylvania, we can say, that despite losing more battles than he won, he still managed to tie down the superior Austro-Russian forces, and preventing them from entering the Great Hungarian Plain, and to attack the Hungarian armies there from the back. The troops of Lüders and Clam-Gallas only reached Transylvania's western border after the main Hungarian army put down its weapons on 13 August. In conclusion, despite his defeats on the battlefield, Bem achieved his main goal.

== Fight for southern Hungary ==
=== Defeat of Perczel ===
In April 1849, Jelačić's troops marched to southern Hungary, where the Serbian and Austrian troops were in serious trouble, and in May they appeared on the battlefield, consolidating the positions of the Serbian and K.u.K. forces in the South. On the other side, Perczel's troops attempted on three occasions (on 22, 24, and 26 May) to capture the Serbs' strongest stronghold, the Titel plateau, but the Serbs, taking advantage of the marshy terrain, repulsed the attack on each occasion.

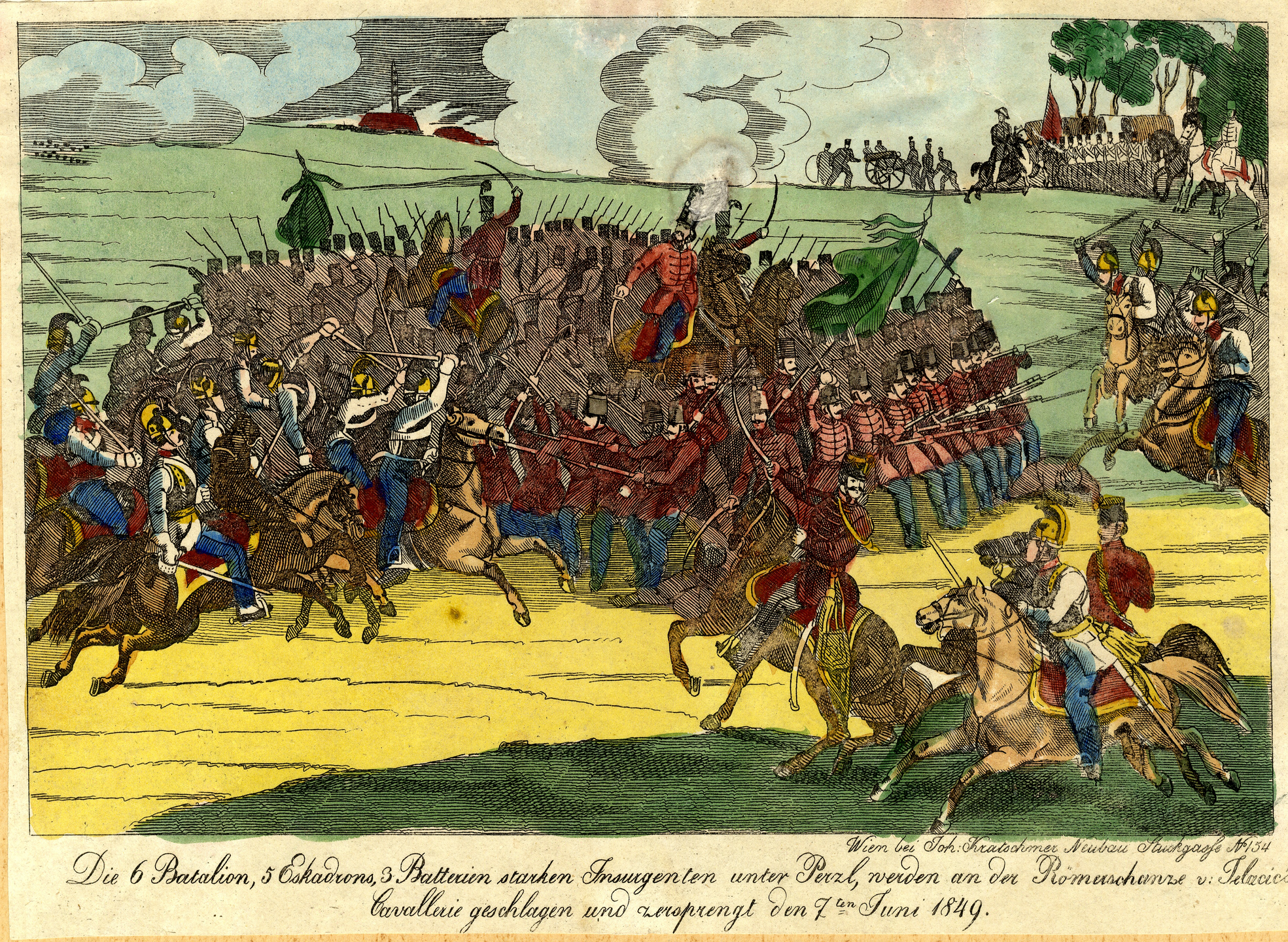
Battle of Káty, 7 June 1849

On 31 May, however, Jelačić's corps arrived near the plateau, causing Percze to withdraw his troops to Újvidék. On 4 June, Perczel attempted to break the imperial siege blockade surrounding the Pétervárad fortress from the south, but the attack was thwarted by the intervention of Jelačić's troops. Finally, the two sides clashed on 7 June in the Battle of Káty in an open battle and Perczel suffered a catastrophic defeat due to the charge of the enemy heavy cavalry led by General Ferenc Ottinger (the latter taking revenge for his defeats inflicted on him by Perczel in January at Szolnok and Battle of Cegléd). The Hungarian loss in the battle was nearly 1500 (more than a quarter of his troops), while the Imperial loss was only 2 dead and 12 wounded.

After the defeat at Káty on 7 June, Perczel handed over command of his troops to Colonel Ágoston Tóth. Tóth withdrew his troops to defend the Franz Canal (Danube-Tisza-Danube Canal). Jelačić, however, did not follow the Hungarian troops in a serious situation but he tried a Siege of Újvidék. He tried to take the city and the Danube bridgehead to a blockade on the fortress of Pétervárad from the north, but he was unsuccessful. The Ban then marched against Tóth, and in the Battle of Óbecse from 25 June drove the Hungarian troops to the left bank of the Tisza. There was no longer a serious obstacle for him to Szeged, but Jelačić was satisfied with his successes so far and retreated to the Franz Canal. It was not until mid-July that he launched another offensive.

On 13 June, the Hungarian garrison at Pétervárad bombarded Novi Sad for several hours, destroying the two thirds of city and forcing Jelačić's forces to retreat.

=== Jelačić’s defeat and retreat ===
By this time, however, the Hungarian troops were already prepared for the attack.

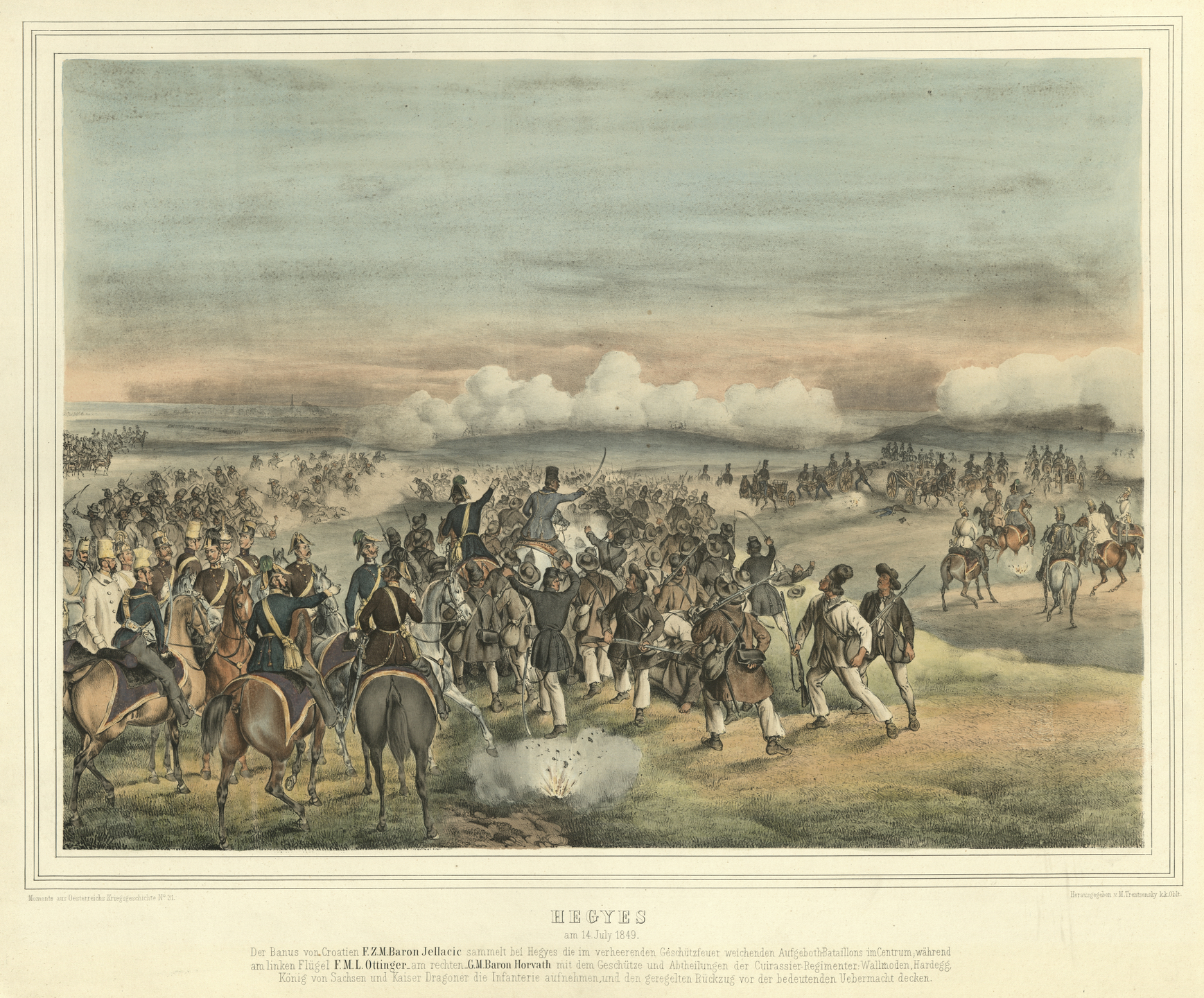
Battle of Kishegyes 14 July 1849

On 14 July Jelačić's more than twice numerous troops, tried to surprise them with a night attack, but the new commander of the Army of the South, Lieutenant-General Antal Vetter and General Richard Guyon defeated the Ban in the Battle of Kishegyes. As a result of this, Jelačić retreated to the Titel plateau and remained there until mid-August.

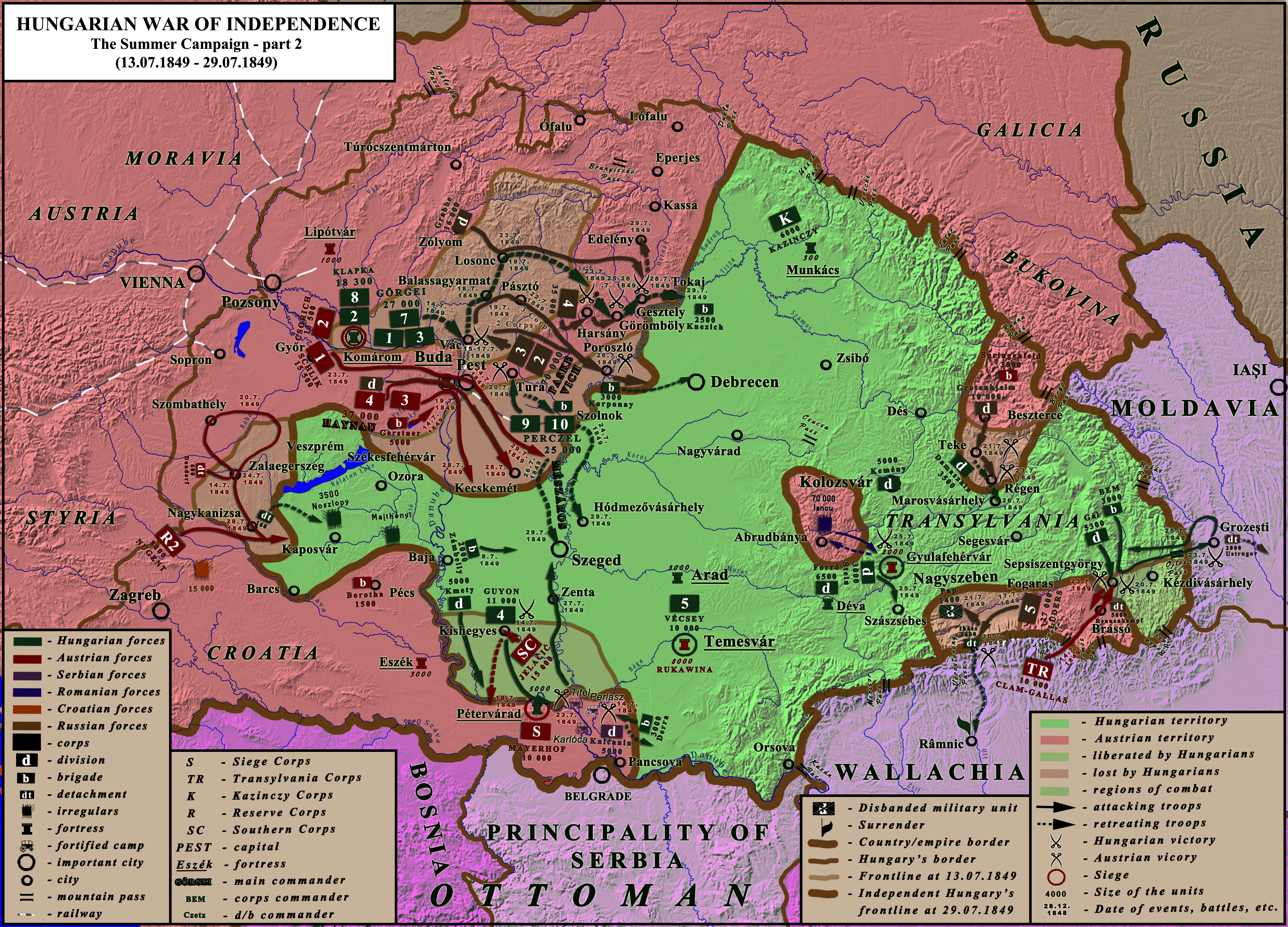
The Military Situation in Hungary between 13.07.1849 and 29.07.1849

Another victory for the Hungarian troops in southern Hungary was that on 1 July one of the most important Austrian fortresses, Arad, surrendered to the Hungarian besiegers led by Lieutenant-General Károly Vécsey, leaving only Temesvár in Austrian hands in the Banat region, around which the Hungarian troops had drawn a tight siege ring.

After Kishegyes, the initiative was again in the hands of the Hungarians. On 17 July Vetter installed his headquarters in the fortress of Pétervárad.

On 23 July, Richard Guyon's IV Corps launched several attacks to take the Titel plateau, but the defenders repulsed them in the Battle of Mosorin. But on the same day, the War Ministry ordered Vetter to send the IV Corps to Szeged, leaving only György Kmety's corps to defend the Danube line and to observe Titel. On 25 July the IV Corps moved towards Szeged. On 31 July the Ministry of War ordered Vetter to tell Kmety to retreat to the left bank of the Tisza. On 3 August, with the execution of this order, the operations in Bácska were essentially over.

== The decisive defeat of the Hungarian main army ==
Lieutenant General Lázár Mészáros, whom Kossuth had appointed commander-in-chief before the Second Battle of Komárom, resigned at the end of July after General Mór Perczel had refused to obey his orders.

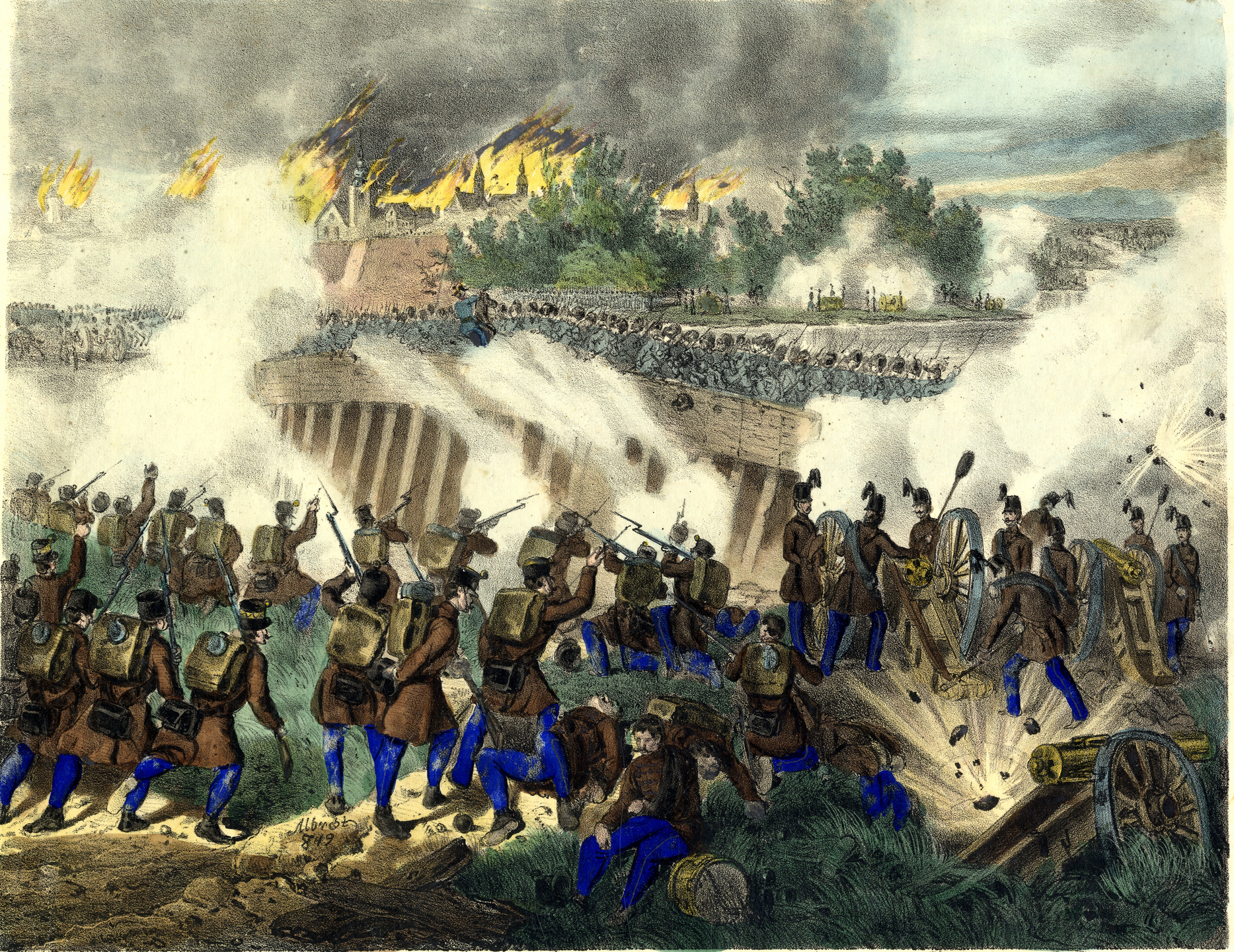
Battle of Szõreg (5 August 1849) - Albrecht J.

After the battle of Tura on 20 July, Perczel and his troops hurried along the Danube-Tisza towards Szeged, where they arrived on 29 July. The Council of Ministers, held on the night of 29–30 July, decided to entrust the choice of Mészáros' successor to Kossuth. Kossuth, inexplicably, did not appoint Antal Vetter, who had excelled in the Southern campaign as the new commander-in-chief, but Mészáros' former Chief of General Staff, Lieutenant General Henryk Dembiński.

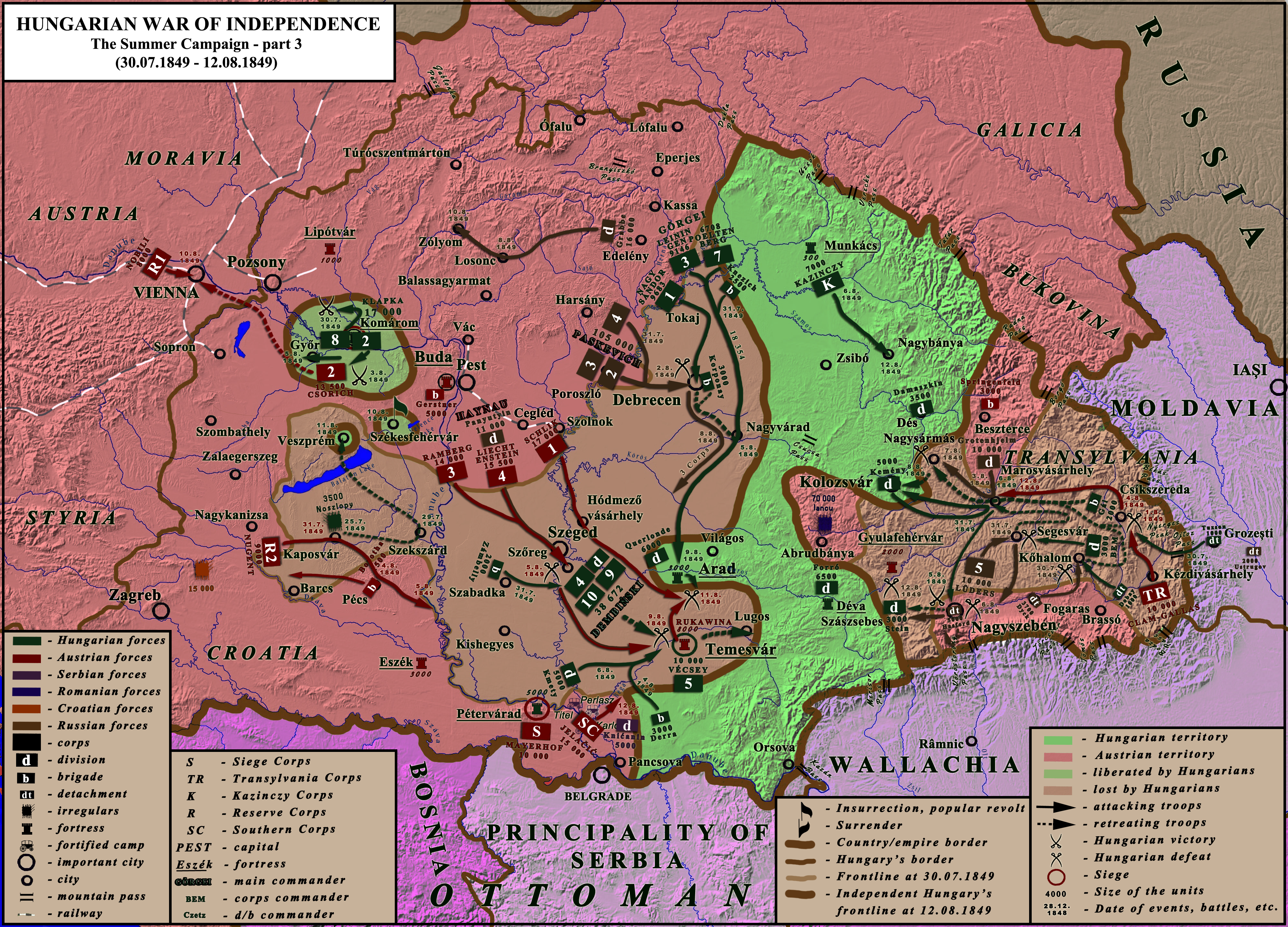
The Military Situation in Hungary between 30.07.1849 and 12.08.1849

At the end of July 1849, tens of thousands of Hungarians were in the fortified camp of Szeged waiting to finally meet the imperial troops led by Field Marshal Haynau approaching Szeged. However, the Hungarian commander-in-chief, Dembiński, who made the plan of the concentration in Szeged, claimed that Szeged was not yet suitable to fight the decisive battle with Haynau's smaller forces. Dembiński, therefore, abandoned the excellently fortified town and the trenches of Szőreg, and faced Haynau's troops outside them, and therefore he lost the Battle of Szőreg on 5 August, then retreated to Banat. Then, although the government ordered Dembiński to join Görgei's troops in Arad to fight together against Haynau, he sent his troops towards Temesvár, although this fortress was still in Austrian hands.

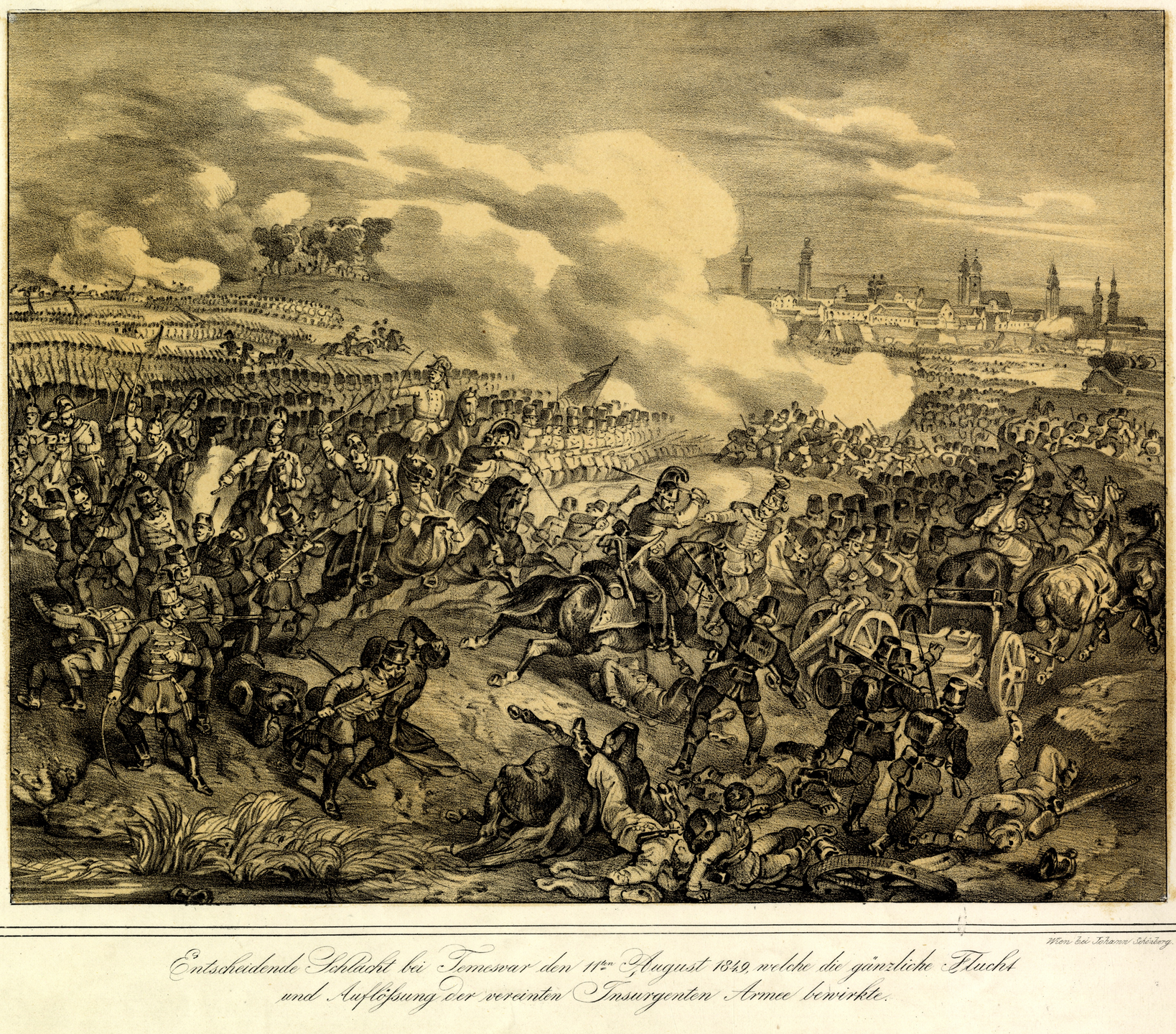
Battle of Temesvári (Schönberg, Johann)

Dembiński had just given the order to retreat towards Lugos when Lieutenant General Bem, newly appointed as commander-in-chief by Kossuth, arrived in the camp. Bem wanted to march to Arad, but he felt that the troops, depressed by the continuous retreat, would benefit from a victorious battle. So he stopped the retreating army and ordered an attack. Bem, including Temesvár's siege corps, had more than 50 000 men, and Haynau, including Temesvár's garrison, had about 38 000, but his artillery was vastly superior to the Hungarian.

The Battle of Temesvár started well for the Hungarians, their right flank drove back the enemy, but then suddenly the Hungarian guns ran out of ammunition. The cause of this was that, when he was still in charge, Dembiński sent the ammunition wagons to Lugos, and did not inform Bem about this. Bem personally tried to turn the tide of the battle, but when he rode into the front line, he fell from his horse and injured himself. The troops began to retreat towards Lúgos. During the retreat, panic broke out, and at Lugos, barely 20,000 of the 50,000-strong army could be gathered. With this defeat the Hungarian War of Independence was over.

== The capitulation ==
=== Negotiation attempts with the Russians ===
On the day of the disaster at Temesvár, the first units of the Army of the Upper Danube led by Görgei arrived at the new concentration point at Arad.

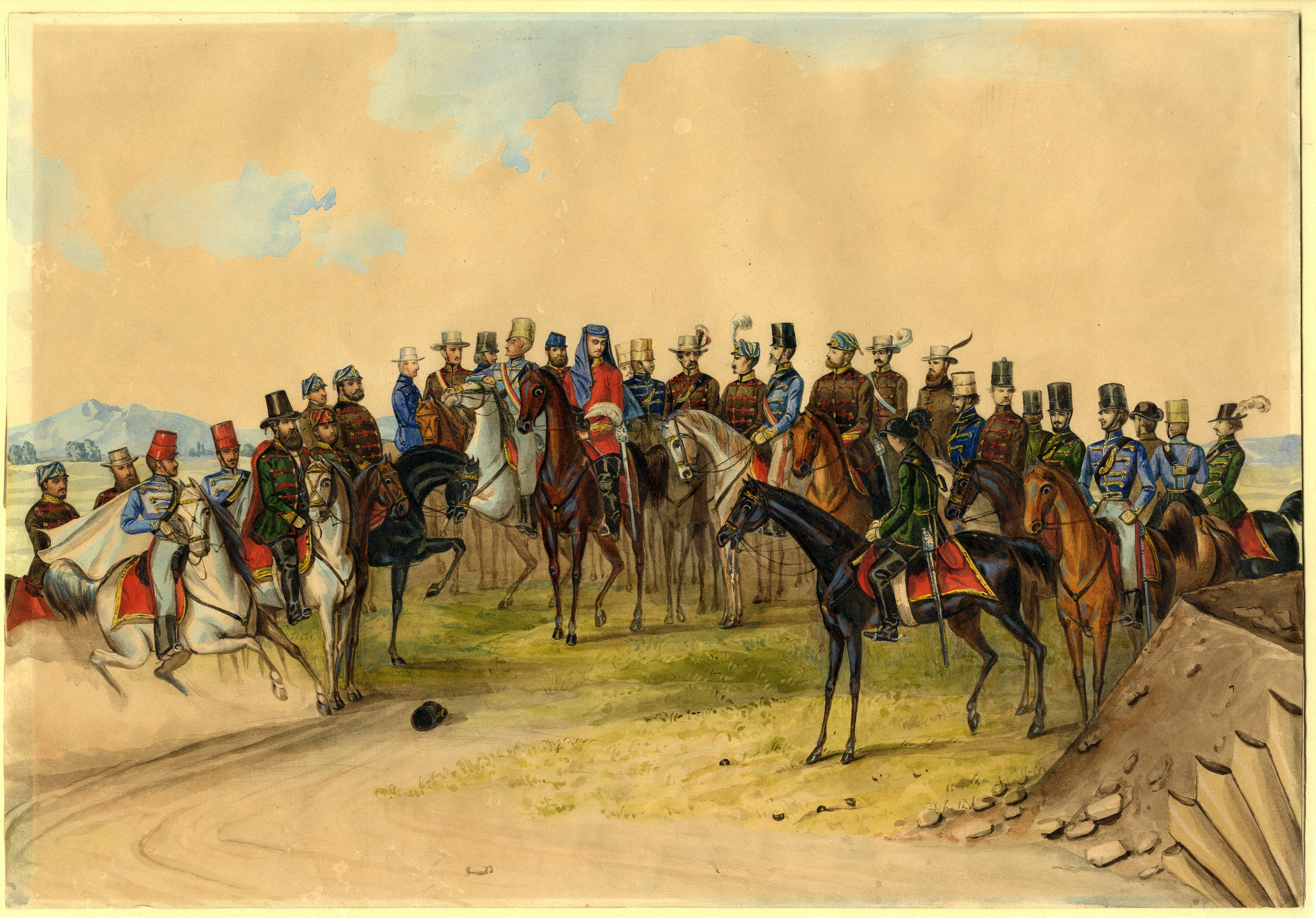
Artúr Görgei and his staff on 16 July 1849. Görgei wears a scarf to protect his head wound received in the Second Battle or Komárom (Mór Than)

During the retreat towards the northeast, Görgei came into contact with the Russian main army, trying to negotiate with them. Görgei took up the negotiations, hoping to drive a wedge between the Austrian and Russian allies. He also informed the government of the negotiations and Kossuth sent Prime Minister Bertalan Szemere and Foreign Minister Kázmér Batthyány to Görgei's camp. The two ministers summarised Hungary's grievances in a memorial, which was sent to the Russian camp. The document proposed the establishment of a Hungarian-Russian alliance based on the Hungarian Constitution from 1848.

But the Russians did not want to negotiate about this. Tsar Nicholas I repeatedly forbade Paskievich to engage in political negotiations with the Hungarian side, and the Russian commander-in-chief also considered negotiations possible only in the interests of the Hungarian capitulation. Thus, Paskevich refused to meet the two ministers, but on 9 August he wrote to Görgei to say that the Russian army was destined to fight, and not to negotiate, and if Görgei wished to surrender in front of the rightful ruler, he should turn to Haynauh.

On 10 August - still unaware of the defeat at Temesvár - the Hungarian Council of Ministers decided to offer the Hungarian crown to a member of the Russian dynasty if he was willing to guarantee the 1848 April laws. The Council of Ministers also declared that if the Russian side refused to negotiate or mediate with Franz Joseph, the Hungarian army was willing to lay down its arms to the Russians in the case of a decisive defeat.

=== The resignation of the government and Görgei’s 3-day dictatorship ===
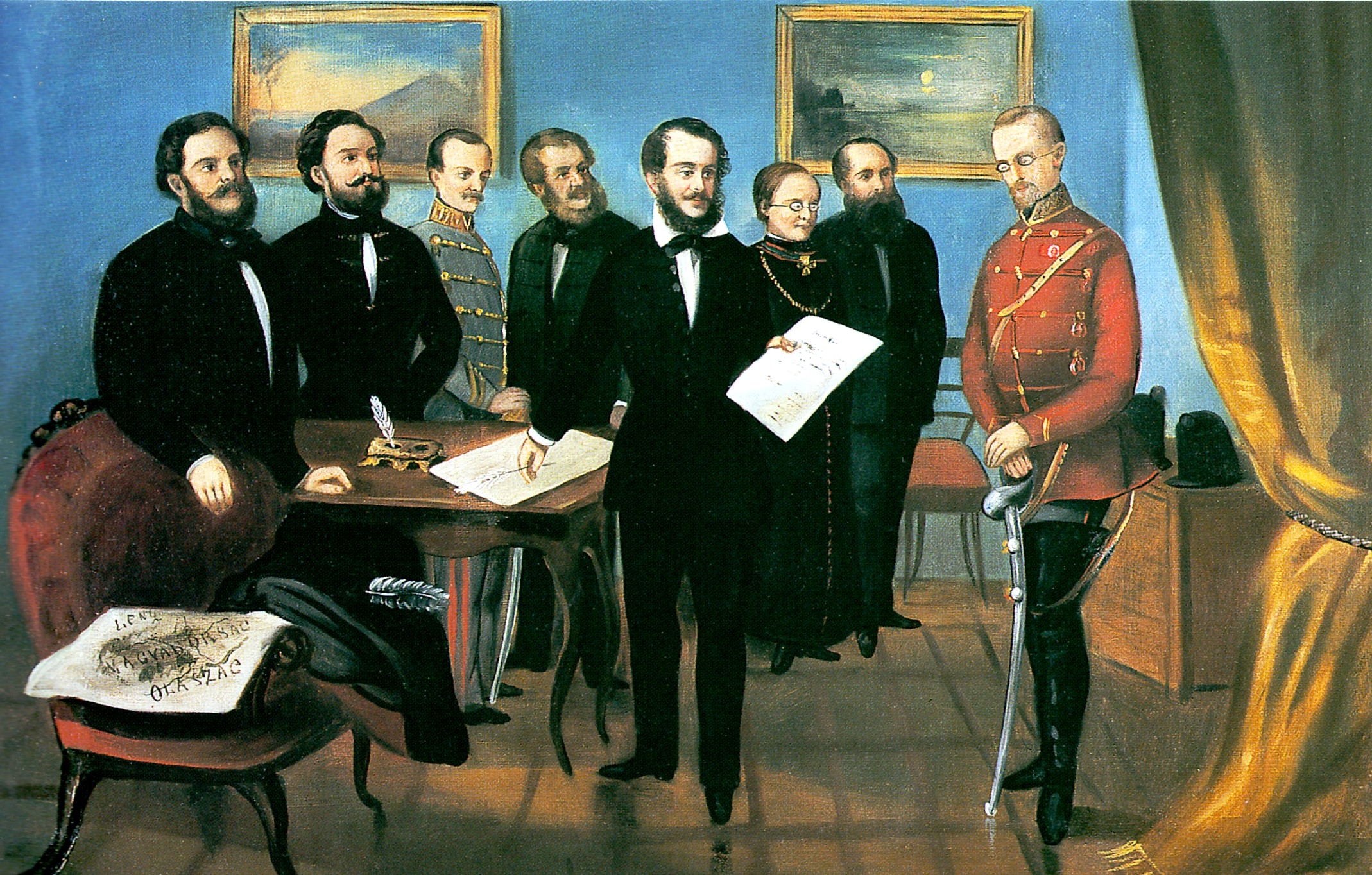
The last Hungarian ministerial council held on 10 August 1849 in Arad, in which Kossuth (in the middle) hands over political and military power to Görgei, naming him the dictator of Hungary

On the evening of August 10, still not knowing the outcome of the decisive battle, Kossuth and Görgei met for the last time in the Arad Castle. Kossuth asked Görgei what he would do if the Hungarians were victorious at Temesvár, and if he was given the command. Then I will attack with all my might, but only against the Austrians, the general said. And if the Austrians win at Temesvár? asked the governor. Then I will lay down my arms, was the reply.

During that night, the report of the defeat at Temesvár arrived. On 11 August Kossuth and most of the government resigned.

Then Kossuth appointed Görgeit as dictator and then left Arad. Then, Görgei issued a proclamation announcing the resignation of the governor and the government, and that he had taken over the military high command and civilian powers. What God's indecipherable decree will bring upon us, we will bear it with manly determination, and with the beatific hope of self-consciousness that the just cause cannot be lost forever, he concluded his proclamation.

=== The capitulation of Világos/Szőlős ===
After the disaster at Temesvár, Görgei's Army of the Upper Danube was the only Hungarian force able to combat, and it was made up of 29 889 soldiers (but 5000 of them were just unarmed recruits), 9339 horses, and 144 cannons.

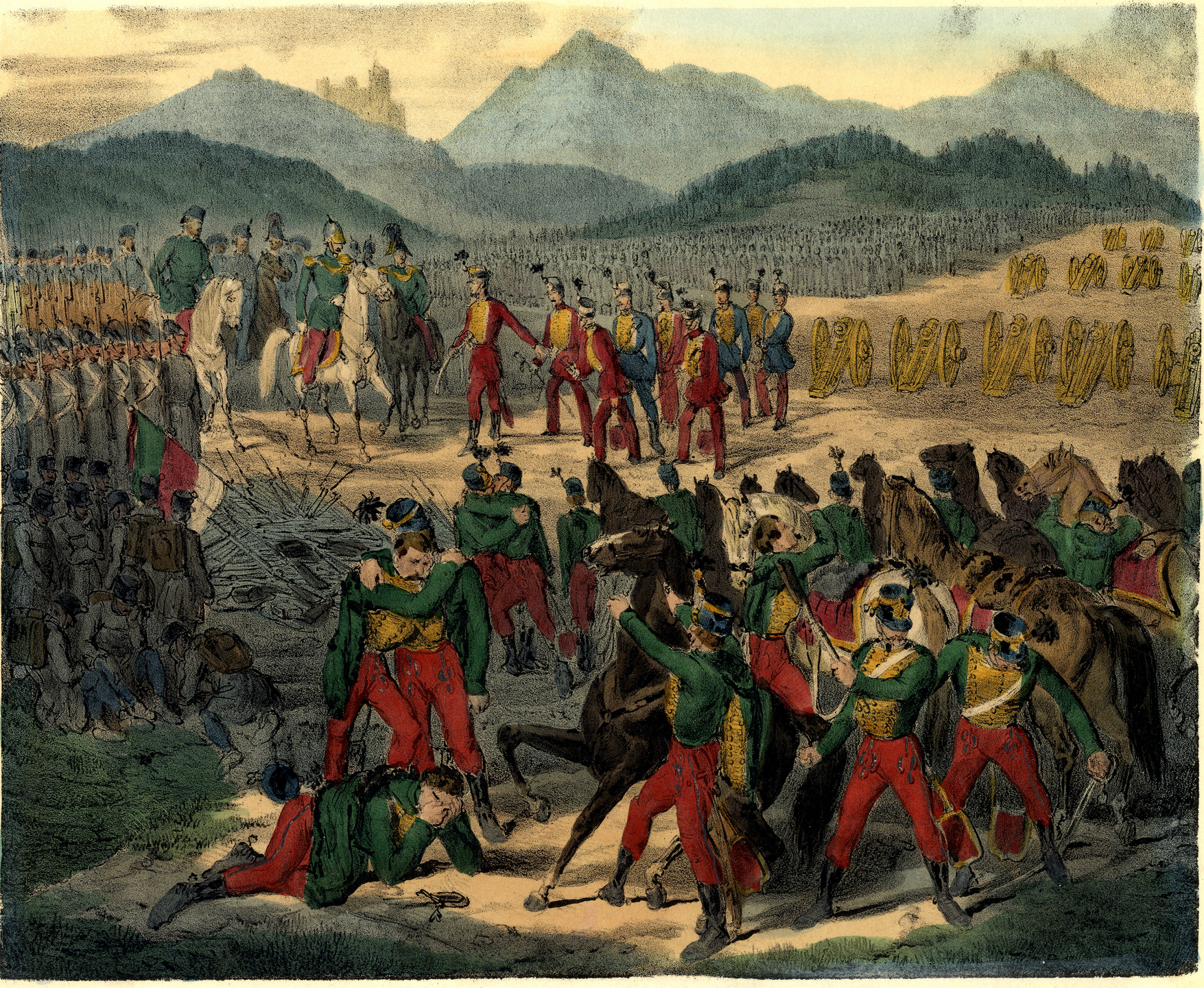
Hungarian surrender at Világos or Szőlős on 13 August 1849 (Gerhardt, Heinrich)

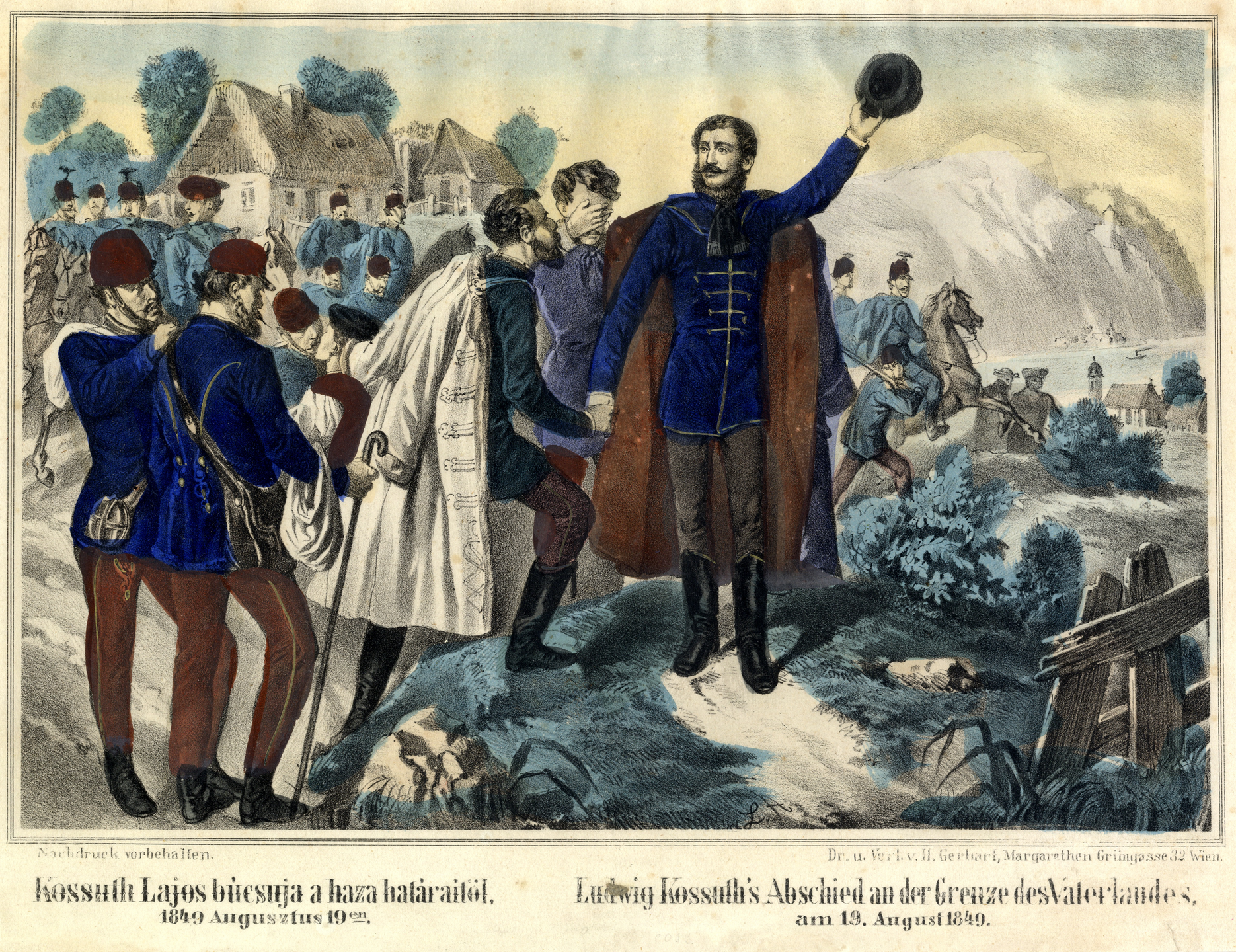
Kossuth's farewell from Hungary on 19 August 1849 on the Turkish border.

Görgei wrote a letter to Russian General Friedrich von Rüdiger, in which he announced the resignation of the government and his willingness to unconditionally lay down his arms to the Russians. He added his hope that the Tsar would not abandon the former officers of the K.u.K. army, who in 1848-1849 fought for the Hungarian cause, to the lust for revenge of the Austrian government. He then called a council of war. He described the military situation, read out the letter to Rüdiger, and proposed a capitulation in front of the Russians. The Council of war accepted his proposal.

On 13 August, on the field of Szőlős under the castle of Világos, the Hungarian Army of the Upper Danube, led by Görgei, surrendered to Russian General Rüdiger. The commander-in-chief rode one last time in front of the ranks, and when he reached the soldiers of the III Corps, they shouted: Long live Görgei!. Upon this, he started crying.

After the surrender, Görgeit was escorted to Paskevich's headquarters. Here he learned that Paskevich could only guarantee his life, while the other officers' lives were at the disposal of the Austrians. The soldiers were sent to Nagyvárad, and the officers were transported to Gyula, where they were handed over to the Austrians.

=== The capitulation of the last troops and the surrender of the castles ===
On hearing the news of Görgei's surrender, Haynau moved his troops against the remnants of the Army of the South. On 15 August, the Imperial troops attacked at Lugos and drove the Hungarian rearguard towards Facset. Bem wanted to march with the forces at his disposal to

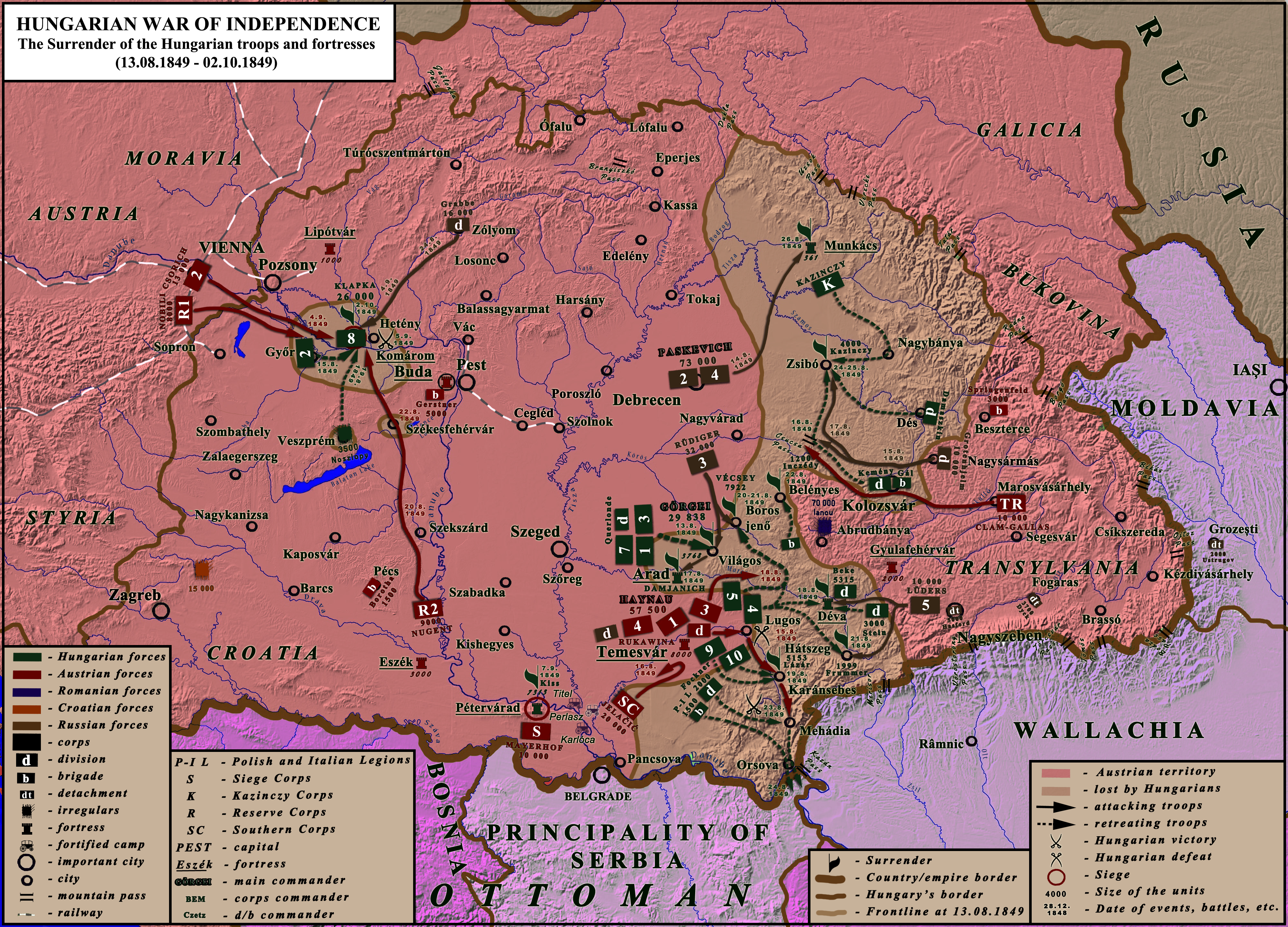
The Surrender of the Hungarian Troops and Fortresses at the end of the Hungarian War of Independence of 1848-1849

Transylvania to continue the fight, but the other officers said that it was hopeless. Part of the army led by Bem headed for Déva, while Károly Vécsey with the remnants of the V Corps headed for Borosjenő. Parts of the IX and X Corps marched towards Karánsebes. Major-General Károly Vécsey, who had separated from Bem at Facset, arrived at Borosjenő on 19 August with a large part of the V Corps, leaving behind his artillery and baggage, and handed over his weapons to the Russian troops here on the following day.

Meanwhile, Haynau's forces pushed the remnants of the IX and X Corps towards the southern border. At the request of the Imperial troops, the troops led by Colonel Vilmos Lázár and Major General Arisztid Dessewffy laid down their arms at Karánsebes on 19 August.

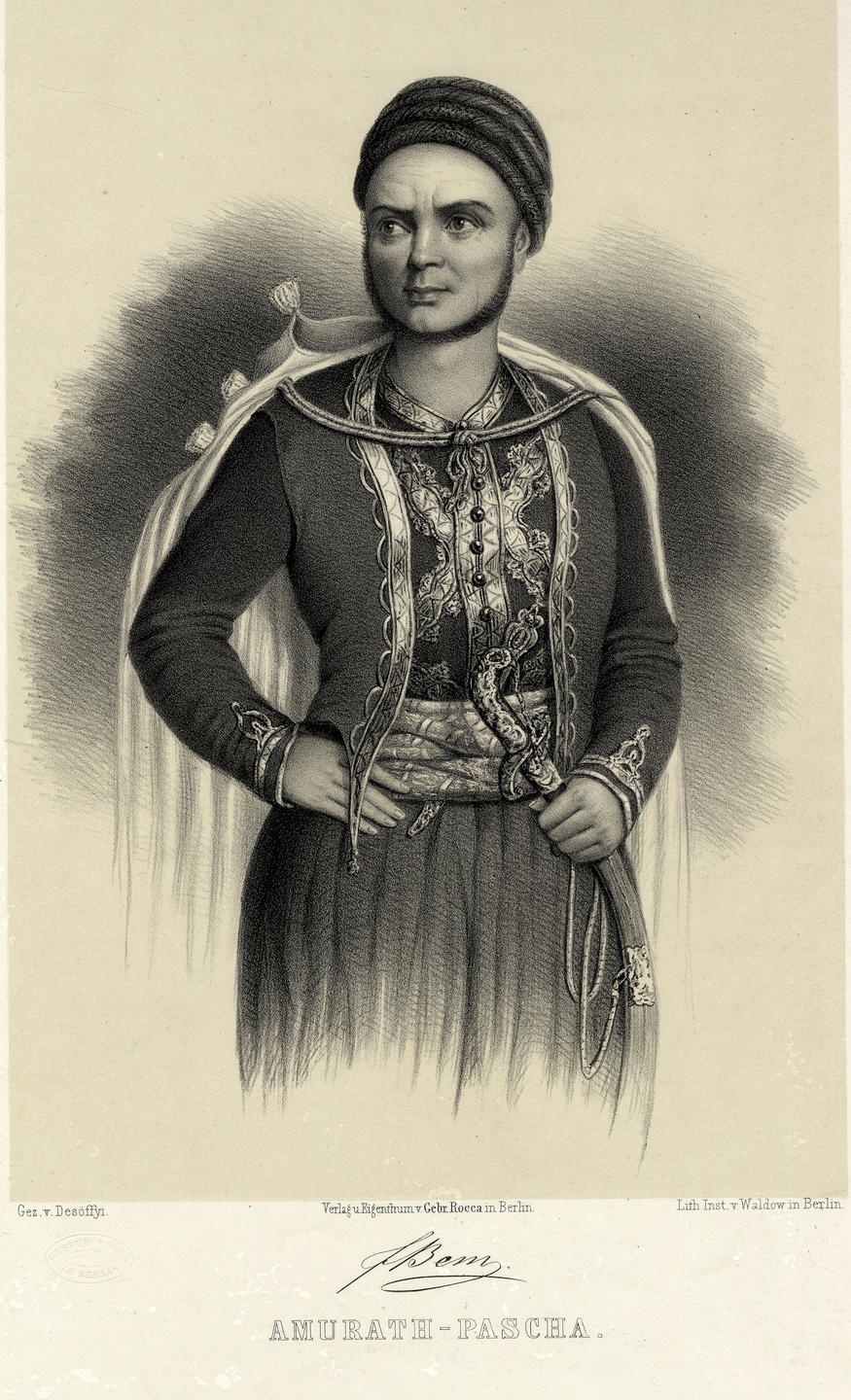
Bem as Amurat Pasha after he fled to the Ottoman Empire (1849–1850)

On 21 August, a brigade, consisting mostly of the units of the IV Corps, laid down their arms at Hátszeg. Most of the southern forces simply disbanded. The only exceptions were the troops of the Banat garrison division led by Colonel József Kollman, and the Polish and Italian legions, which left the country in an orderly manner and entered Ottoman territory at Orsova. On 23 August, the troops led by Major Josef Fockner repulsed the attack of the K.u.K. troops at Mehádia, and only the next day they finally left Hungary.

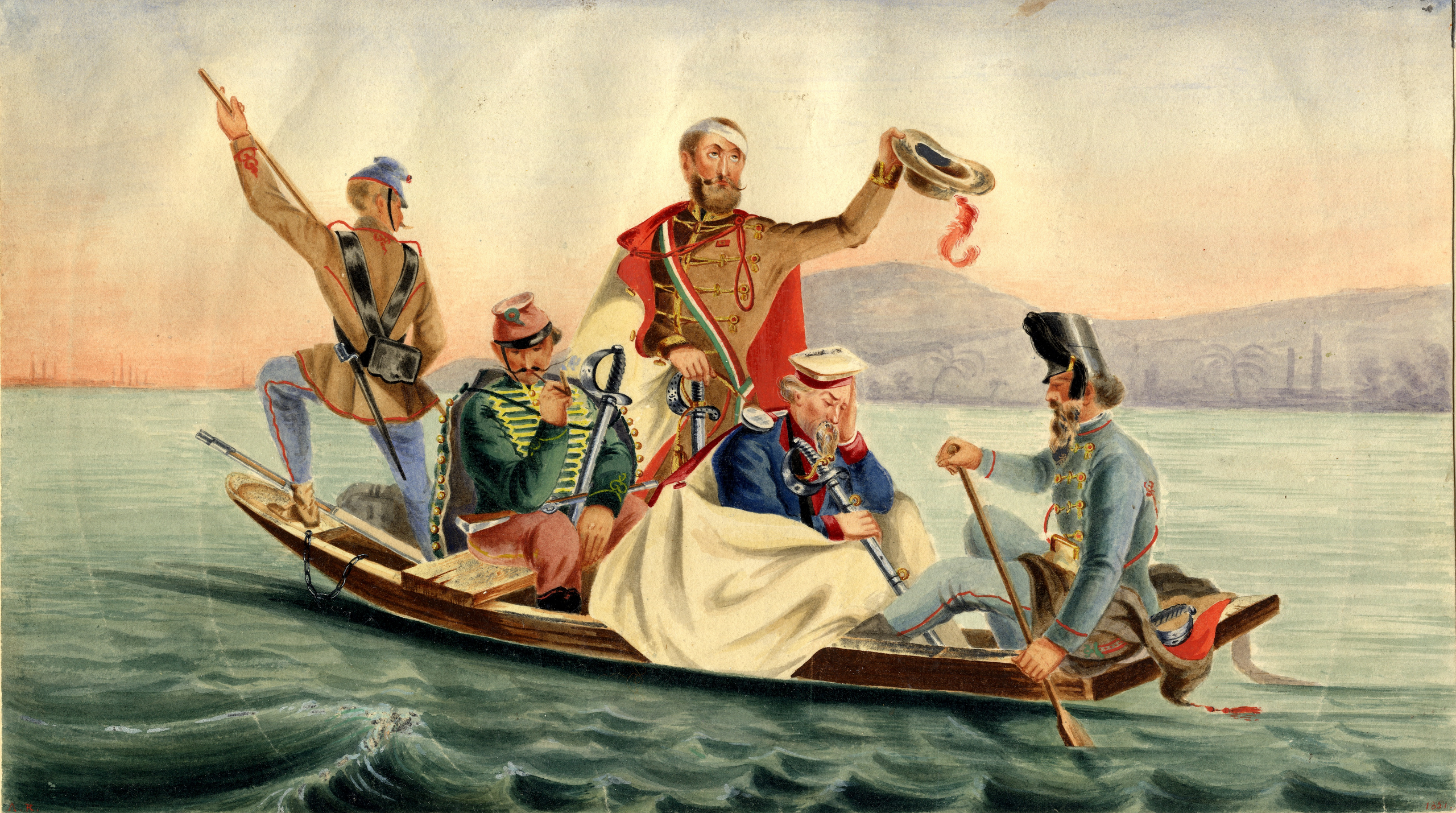
Hungarian freedom fighters crowing the Danube into the Ottoman Empire

In Bem's absence, Colonel Miksa Stein suffered a heavy defeat at Szászsebes on 12 August and retreated to Deva. On 14 August, due to the negligence of the guards, the castle of Déva exploded, after which Stein retreated to Dobra. Bem reached Dobra, took command and pushed forward to Déva. But here he saw that resistance was hopeless, so he left the army, and together with Stein they fled to Turkish territory. The command was taken over by Colonel Beke József, and on 18 August he laid down his arms to Lüders' forces at Déva. The remnants of the Háromszék division led by Sándor Gál arrived on 9 August Kolozsvár, where they joined the division of Farkas Kemény. Grotenhjelm's troops approached the city on 14 August. The Hungarian troops evacuated the town, and on 16 and 17 August they clashed with the Austrian and Russian troops at Bánffyhunyad. After the two battles, Gál retreated to Csucsa and from there to Zilah. Here he learned that Colonel Lajos Kazinczy's division was approaching Dés.

On 5 August Kazinczy received Bem's order to march to Transylvania. The division arrived at Dés on 15 August, and on 20 August it joined Gál's troops at Zsibó. It was here that he received Görgei's letter calling him to surrender. The War Council decided to lay down arms before the Russians. However, the majority of the troops simply went home. Thus, on 24–25 August, barely a few hundred soldiers and officers laid down their arms in front of Grotenhjelm's troops. With this, the last mobile force capitulated. Hungary lies at the feet of Your Majesty, Paskevich reported to Nicholas I.

The example of the mobile troops was soon followed by the forts. On 17 August the garrisons of Arad and on 26 August those of Munkács surrendered unconditionally. Pétervárad was surrounded by the Austrian troops only after 17 August 1849. The garrison entered into negotiations with the imperial command, and on 7 September unconditionally surrendered the fortress to the besiegers.

== The heroic resistance of Komárom ==
=== The defenders crush the besieging troops ===
The only fortress continued to resist: was the "virgin castle" (as no one had yet been able to take it by siege), Komárom.

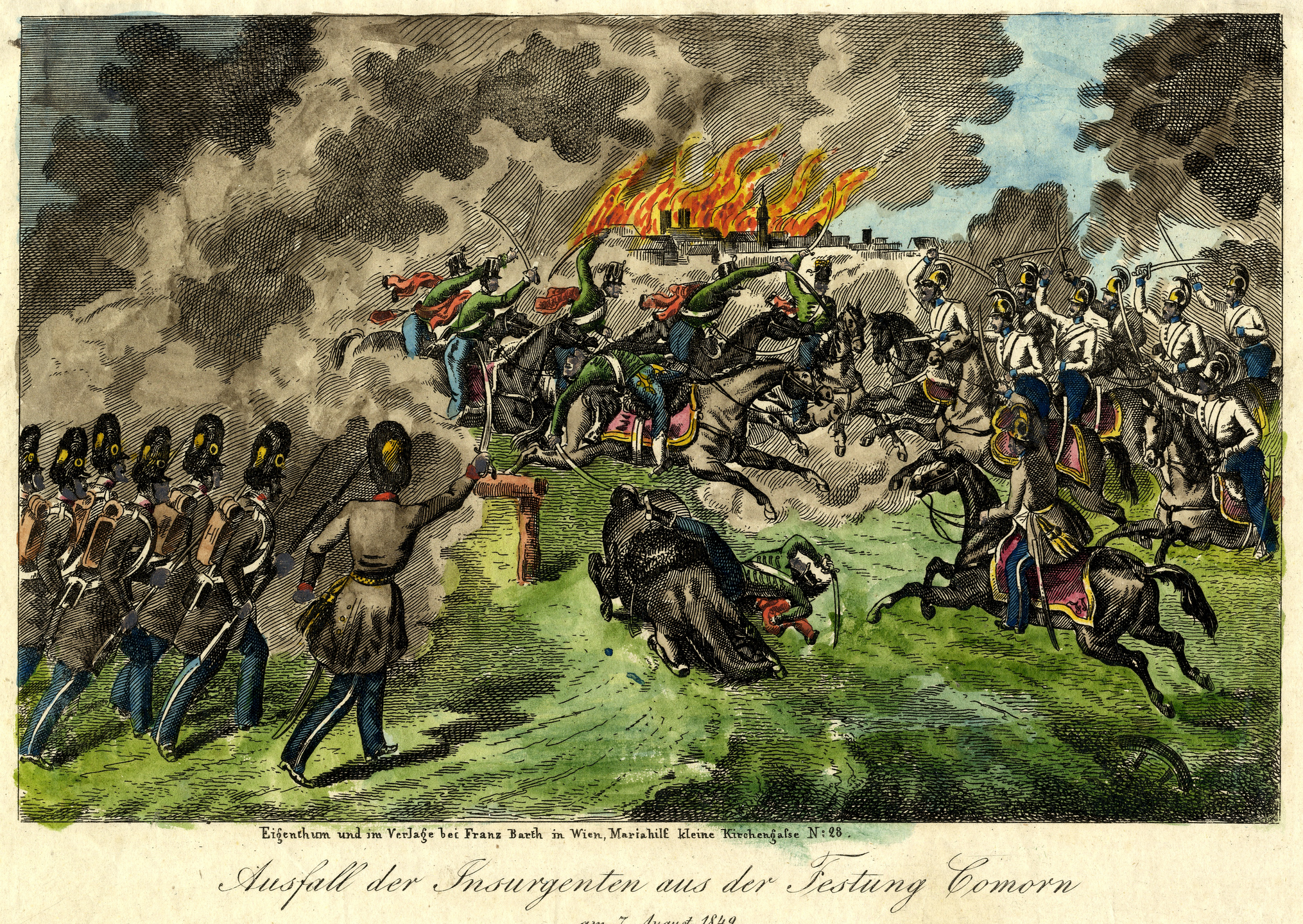
Hungarian hussars crushing the blockade of Komárom 3 Auguszt 1849

After the departure of Görgei's Army of the Upper Danube, 19 000 soldiers remained in the fortress of Komárom, led by General György Klapka.

On 25 July, a detachment of the garrison made a raid against the Austrian troops in Tata, and acquired a document with the number and location of the besieging army. Klapka then drew up a plan for an operation to crush the Austrian siege army. In the Fourth Battle of Komárom, on 30 July, he drove the enemy first from the left bank of the Danube, and then on 3 August he put to flight Austrian the forces from the right bank. The Imperial troops lost more than 2,000 men, 30 pieces of artillery and thousands of firearms. This was the last major Hungarian victory of the War of Independence. After smashing the siege blockade, Klapka pushed forward as far as Győr, chasing the retreating imperial troops. With this maneuver, Klapka cut the connection between Vienna and the Imperial Army of Haynau for days. On the news of the victory, the people of Székesfehérvár revolted and chased out their Austrian garrison.

=== Komárom's last month of defense and its surrender ===
However, on 13–14 August, Klapka was forced to evacuate Győr and return to Komárom.

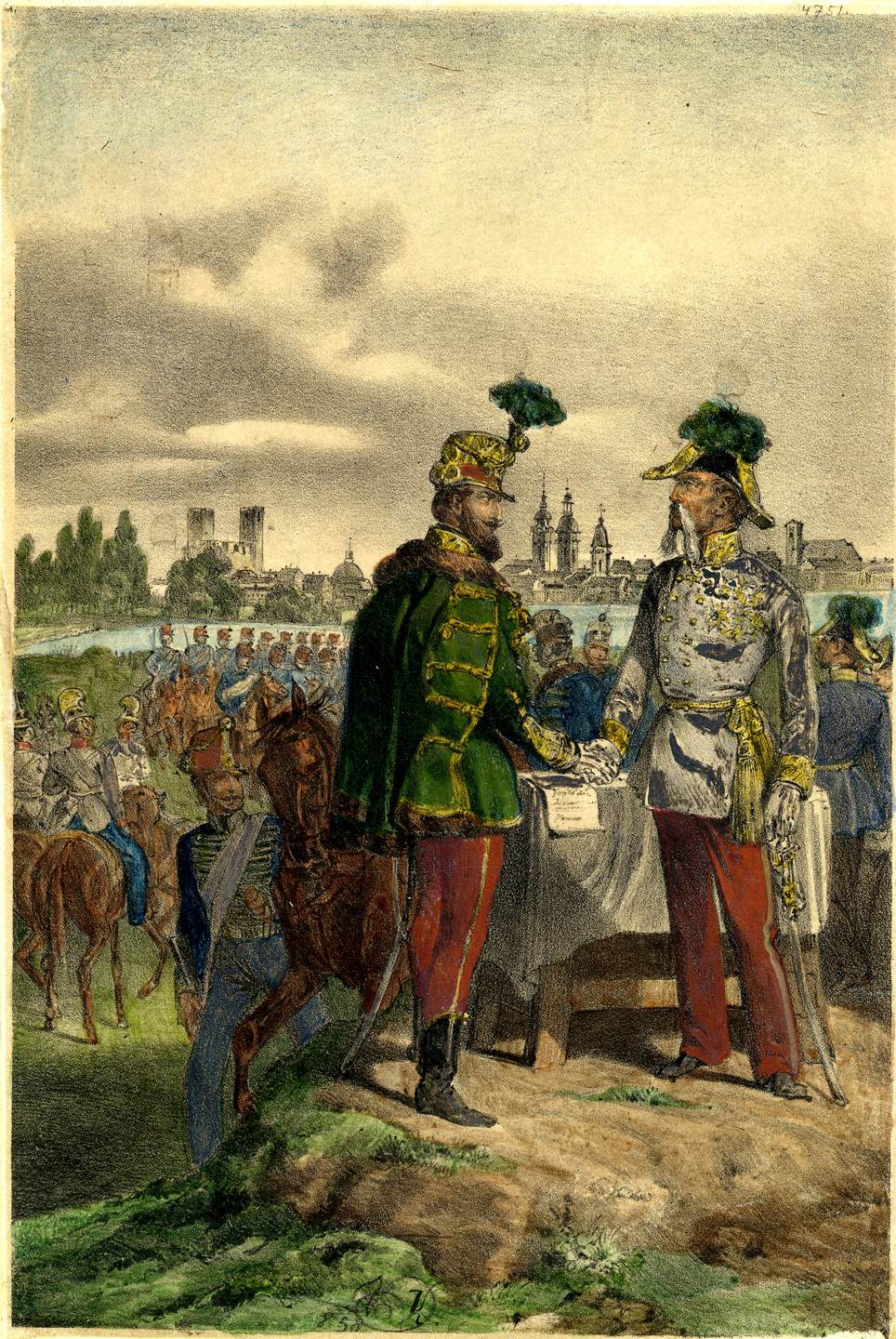
Surrender of Komárom on 2 October 1849 - Winzenz Katzler

On 19 August the Imperial troops began again to surround Komárom, and they requested the surrender of the fortress.

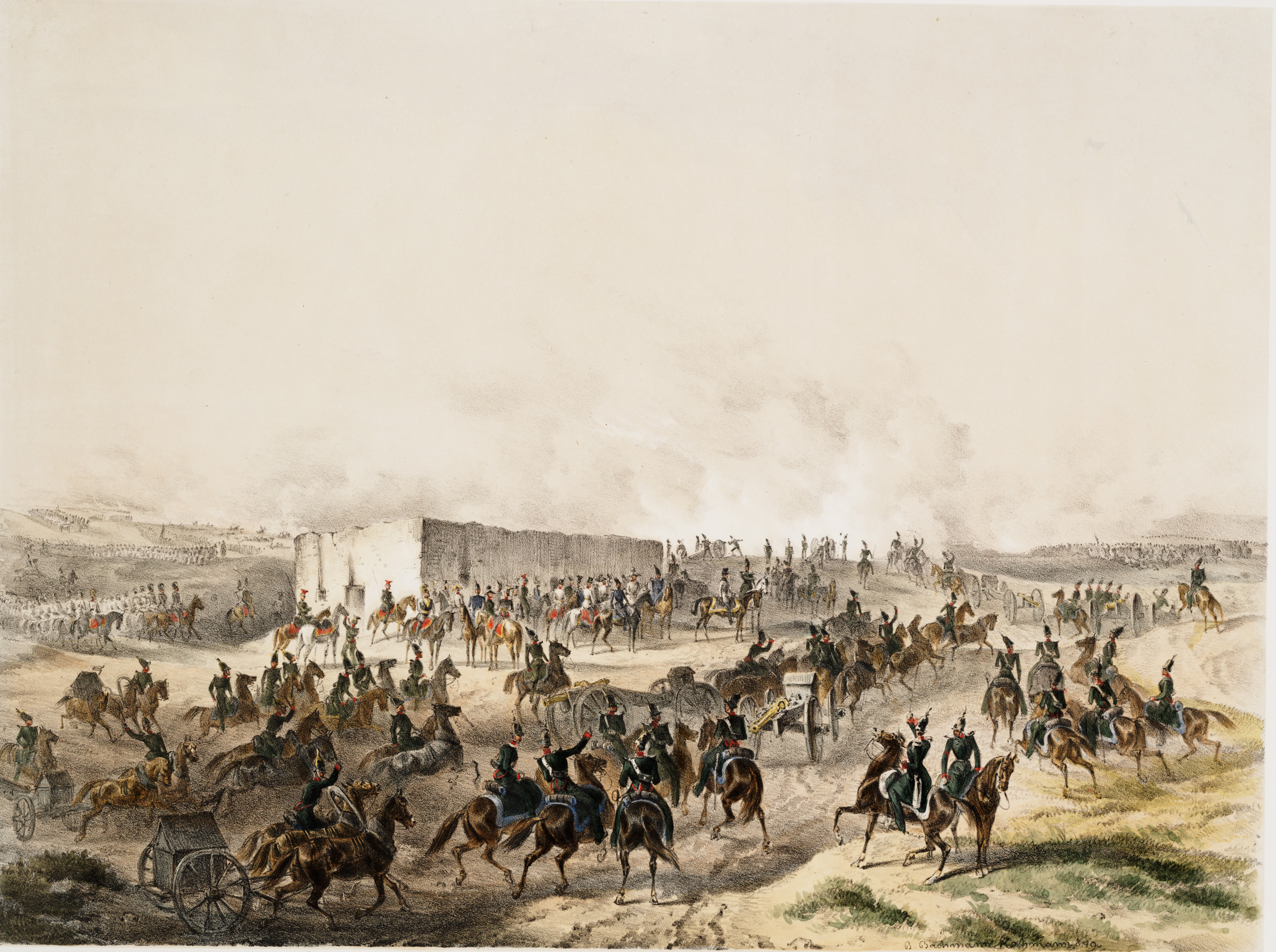
Komárom's blockade on 5th September 1849 (Bachmann-Hohmann)

The garrison replied that they would surrender only on certain terms, but these were rejected by the commanders of the Austrian and Russian armies surrounding the castle. Therefore, during September, the Hungarian breakouts and the Austrian and Russian attacks on the castle continued, resulting in some skirmishes. One of the most notable of these was the Battle of Hetény on 5 September, in which some 300 Hussars defeated a Russian Cossack force of the same size. These successful Hungarian breakthroughs, and the failure of the besieging troops' attacks, convinced Haynau that if he tried to take the fortress of Komárom by siege, it would only be at the cost of a long loss of material, time, and men. He, therefore, showed himself ready to compromise with the defenders. On 27 September, a delegation of the garrison and Haynau agreed on the terms of the fortress' surrender. According to the agreement, the members of the garrison and the civilians in the fortress were granted amnesty, and the soldiers and politicians were free to leave for foreign countries. The possession of the fortress was worth enough to the Austrians to ensure the free departure and impunity of the defenders. The fortress was handed over on 2–4 October. These favorable conditions for the defenders were subsequently extended to the members of the Pétervárad garrison so that they too were exempted from punishment; although later most of the soldiers of Pétervárad were forcedly conscripted into the K.u.K. army.

== Results and evaluation of the Summer Campaign ==
By the summer of 1849, the Hungarian army had evolved into a near-professional force. Campaigns led by Görgei in Upper Hungary and by Bem in Transylvania demonstrated remarkable strategic skill, as Hungarian commanders managed to impose their will on numerically superior enemies. However, even the most brilliant leadership could not alter the fundamental imbalance of power, making ultimate victory unlikely.

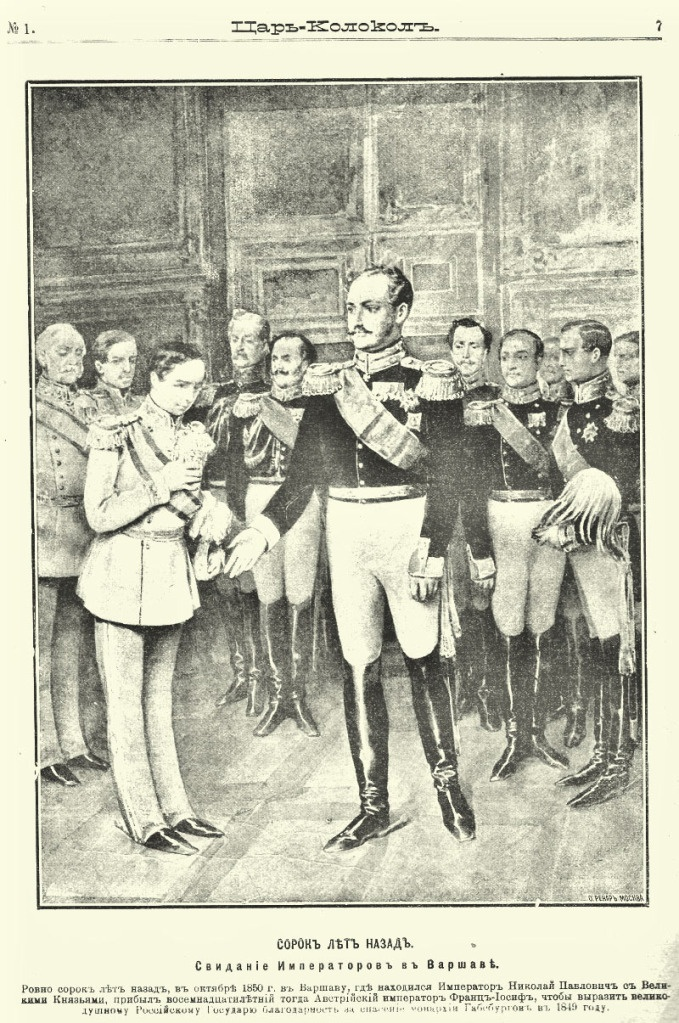
Franz Joseph's meeting with Nicholas I in Warsaw in October 1850, to show his gratitude for the Russian help to defeat Hungary in 1849.

Across the various theaters, Hungarian forces generally performed well. In July, the Upper Danube army blocked the union of Austrian and Russian main forces. The southern army reversed a losing situation, while Bem's army prevented Russian troops from advancing out of Transylvania. Tactically, the Hungarian army showed significant improvement, rarely suffering catastrophic defeats despite overwhelming odds. Where defeats did occur—such as at Káty, Debrecen, or Segesvár—they were often due to poor planning or unfit commanders. The disastrous Battle of Temesvár became a rout only during the retreat, not in the field itself.

Many setbacks stemmed from poor reconnaissance, weak planning, and the incompetence of some officers. A major factor, however, was misguided political interference, most notably the concentration of forces at Szeged and the subsequent appointment of Dembiński as commander-in-chief—decisions that directly contributed to the Temesvár defeat.

Earlier in the spring campaign, Hungarian corps were led by talented generals—many former officers in the imperial army who proved capable of commanding large units. But by summer, this leadership cadre had largely disappeared: Damjanich was wounded, Klapka moved to a political role, and Aulich took leave. Their successors often lacked the ability—and sometimes even the experience—to manage larger formations. Most had advanced too quickly through the ranks, lacking the time to gain necessary skills.

This leadership problem was also evident in Bem's army: operations faltered whenever he was absent. The situation was somewhat better in the south, where Vécsey and Guyon proved capable corps commanders, and Vetter emerged as a competent overall leader.

Could Austria have won the war alone? Unlikely. In every major battle of the summer campaign, Haynau's army relied on Russian support. A 12,000-strong Russian division played decisive roles at Pered, Komárom, Szőreg, and Temesvár. Without Russian intervention, Upper Hungary might have remained in Hungarian hands. Görgei was forced to leave Komárom only because a 120,000-strong Russian force reached the northern edge of the Great Plain. In Transylvania, it was Lüders’ Russian corps—not the Austrians—that defeated Bem.

Without Russia, Haynau would likely have been stopped at Komárom. Until late July, the Hungarians were on the offensive in the south and withdrew to Szeged only under government orders. Had Temesvár been captured in August, the siege of Gyulafehérvár could have begun in earnest. In short, Austria could not win the war—or secure the peace—without Russian help.

== Sources ==
- Babucs, Zoltán (2017), "A győri ütközet (The Battle of Győr)", Felvidék.ma (2017.06.28.)
- Babucs, Zoltán (2017), "A harmadik komáromi csata (The Third battle of Komárom)", Felvidék.ma 11 July 2017
- Babucs, Zoltán (2017), "A szabadságharc komáromi záróakkordja (The Final Chord of the War of Independence at Komárom)", Felvidék.ma (2017.09.27.)
- Babucs, Zoltán (2021), ""A hetényi huszárcsíny" (The Hussar Trick of Hetény)", Magyarságkutató Intézet (4 September 2021) (in Hungarian)
- Babucs, Zoltán (2020), ""Az 1849 augusztus 3-i komáromi kitörés" (The Sortie from Komárom of 3 August 1849)", Magyarságkutató Intézet (2 August 2020) (in Hungarian)
- Babucs, Zoltán (2021), ""Kétnapos csata Perednél 1849 június 20-21-én" (Two-Day Battle at Pered on 20-21 June 1849)", Magyarságkutató Intézet (19 June 2021) (in Hungarian)
- Babucs, Zoltán (2023), ""A segesvári ütközet (1849 július 31)" (The Battle of Segesvár (31 July 1849))", Magyarságkutató Intézet (31 July 2023) (in Hungarian)
- Bánlaky, József (2001). A magyar nemzet hadtörténelme ("The Military History of the Hungarian Nation). Arcanum Adatbázis Kft.
- Bereznay, István (2016), "A szabadságharc végnapjai és a világosi fegyverletétel (The Final Days of the War of Independence and the Surrender at Világos)", Úkor.hu (2016-08-13) (in Hungarian)
- Bona, Gábor (2018). Az 1848/49-es szabadságharc tisztikara ("The Officers of the War of Independence of 1848/49). Arcanum Adatbázis Kft.
- Bordi, Zsigmond Lóránd (2010), "A második kökösi csata 1849 július 2 (The Second Battle of Kökös 2 July 1849)" (PDF), Acta Siculia - A Székely Múzeum Évkönyve
- Cséffalvay, István (1933), "Az 1849 aug. 5. és 6-i nagyszebeni harcok orosz forrás nyomán (The Battles of 5th and 6th August 1849 according to a Russian Source)" (PDF), Hadtörténelmi közlemények XXXIV
- Csikány, Tamás (2013), "Egy céltalan haditerv - Komárom 1849 július 11 (A Senseless Military Plan - Komárom 11 June 1849)" (PDF), Hadtörténelmi közlemények
- Csikány, Tamás (2015). A szabadságharc hadművészete 1848-1849 ("The Military Art of the War of Independence 1848-1849") (in Hungarian). Budapest: Zrínyi. ISBN 978--963-327-647-1.
- Demeter, Lajos (2006), "Fadgyas Bálint honvéd főhadnagy az 1849 július 5-ei eprestetői csatáról (First Lieutenant Bálint Fadgyas on the battle of Eprestető on July 5, 1849)" (PDF), Határvidék 1762-1918
- Egyed, Ákos (2010). Erdély 1848–1849 ("Transylvania in 1848-1849") (in Hungarian). Csíkszereda: Pallas-Akadémia Könyvkiadó. p. 616. ISBN 978-973-665-312-4.
- Görgey, Artúr (2004). Életem és működésem Magyarországon 1848-ban és 1849-ben- Görgey István fordítását átdolgozta, a bevezetőt és a jegyzeteket írta Katona Tamás (My Life and Activity in Hungary in 1848 and in 1849). István Görgey's translation was revised by Tamás Katona, and also he wrote the Introduction and the Notes. Neumann Kht.
- Gyalokay, Jenő (1938). Az erdélyi hadjárat 1849 nyarán ("The Transylvanian Campaign in the Summer of 1849) (PDF). Franklin.
- Hermann, Róbert (1999). Az abrudbányai tragédia, 1849 [The Tragedy of Abrudbánya, 1849] (in Hungarian). Budapest: Heraldika Kiadó. p. 330. ISBN 963-858-5315.
- Hermann, Róbert (1999). "Az ihászi ütközet emlékkönyve 1849-1999 (Commemorative Book of the Battle of Ihász 1849-1999)". mek.oszk.hu. Pápa.
- Hermann, Róbert (1999), ""Tenni kevés, de halni volt esély." Az 1849. évi nyári hadjárat ("For Doing Something it Was Little Chance, but to Die it Was a Lot". The Summer Campaign of 1849)" (PDF), Hadtörténelmi Közlemények. 112. (1999) 1.
- Hermann, Róbert (2001). 1848-1849. A szabadságharc hadtörténete ("1848–1849. The History of the War of Independence) (in Hungarian). Budapest: Korona Kiadó. p. 424. ISBN 9639376213.
- Hermann, Róbert (2004). Az 1848–1849-es szabadságharc nagy csatái ("Great battles of the Hungarian War of Independence of 1848–1849") (in Hungarian). Budapest: Zrínyi. ISBN 963-327-367-6.
- Hermann, Róbert (2009). Magyarország története 14. Forradalom és szabadságharc 1848-1849 ("The history of Hungary 14. The Hungarian Revolution and War of Independence of 1848–1849) (in Hungarian). Budapest: Kossuth Kiadó. p. 112. ISBN 978-963-09-5692-5.
- Hermann, Róbert (2011). A magyar függetlenségi háború [Great Battles 16: The Hungarian Freedom War]. Nagy csaták. 16. (in Hungarian). Budapes t: Duna Könyvklub. ISBN 978-615-5129-00-1.
- Hermann, Róbert (2011), "Áruló volt-e Görgei? (Was Görgei a Traitor?)", Rubicon (2011/9-10) (in Hungarian)
- Hermann, Róbert (2021), ""Bem apó" (Papa Bem)", Rubicon (2021/7) (in Hungarian)
- Horváth, Attila (2016), Az 1849. augusztus 2-i debreceni ütközet (The Battle of Debrecen from 2. December 1849) (PDF)
- Horváth, Gábor (2017). "A csornai ütközet. Ezen a napon történt (The Battle of Csorna. This Day Happened)". Győri Szalon. Archived from the original on March 31, 2024.
- Horváth, Gábor (2017). "Augusztus 9. – A Temesvári csata. Ezen a napon történt (The Battle of Temesvár 9 August 1849. This Day Happened)". Győri Szalon. Archived from the original on Jun 3, 2023.
- Horváth, Gábor (2017). "Véget ér a második váci csata (The Second Battle of Vác Ends. This Day Happened)". Győri Szalon.
- Jónás, András (2002), "Csata a tömösi szorosban – 1849. június 20 (Battle in the Tömös Pass - 20 June 1849)" (PDF), Hétfalu. VIII. évfolyam 6. (494.) szám
- Kemény, Krisztián (2018), ""Tüntetés" a fővezér ellen? Görgei Artúr, Asbóth Lajos és a II. hadtest tisztikarának nyilatkozata (1849. június 22.) (Demonstration Against the High Commander? The Declaration of Artúr Görgei, Lajos Asbóth and the Officer Staff of the II. Corps. 22 June 1849)" (PDF), Aetas. 33. évf. (2018.) 3. sz.
- Olchváry, Ödön (1902). A magyar függetlenségi harc 1848-1849-ben a Délvidéken (in Hungarian). Zenta: Márkus Samu Könyvnyomdája.
- Spira, György (1959). A magyar forradalom 1848–49-ben [The Hungarian Revolution in 1848–1849] (in Hungarian). Budapest: Gondolat Kiadó. p. 676.
- Thim, József (1940). A magyarországi 1849-49-iki szerb fölkelés története I (History of the Serb Uprising in Hungary in 1848-49 vol. I) (PDF) (in Hungarian). Budapest: Magyar Történelmi Társulat.
- Voronov, Aleksandr (2001), "The Olga Hussars. A Battle Between Russian and Hungarian Hussars, 8(20) July 1849. (Translated by Mark Conrad)", Цейхгауз. 13, 1/2001. pp. 22-28
