= Battle of Debrecen (1849) =

Coordinates: 47°31′24.2″N 21°35′49.2″E

- Part of the Hungarian Revolution of 1848
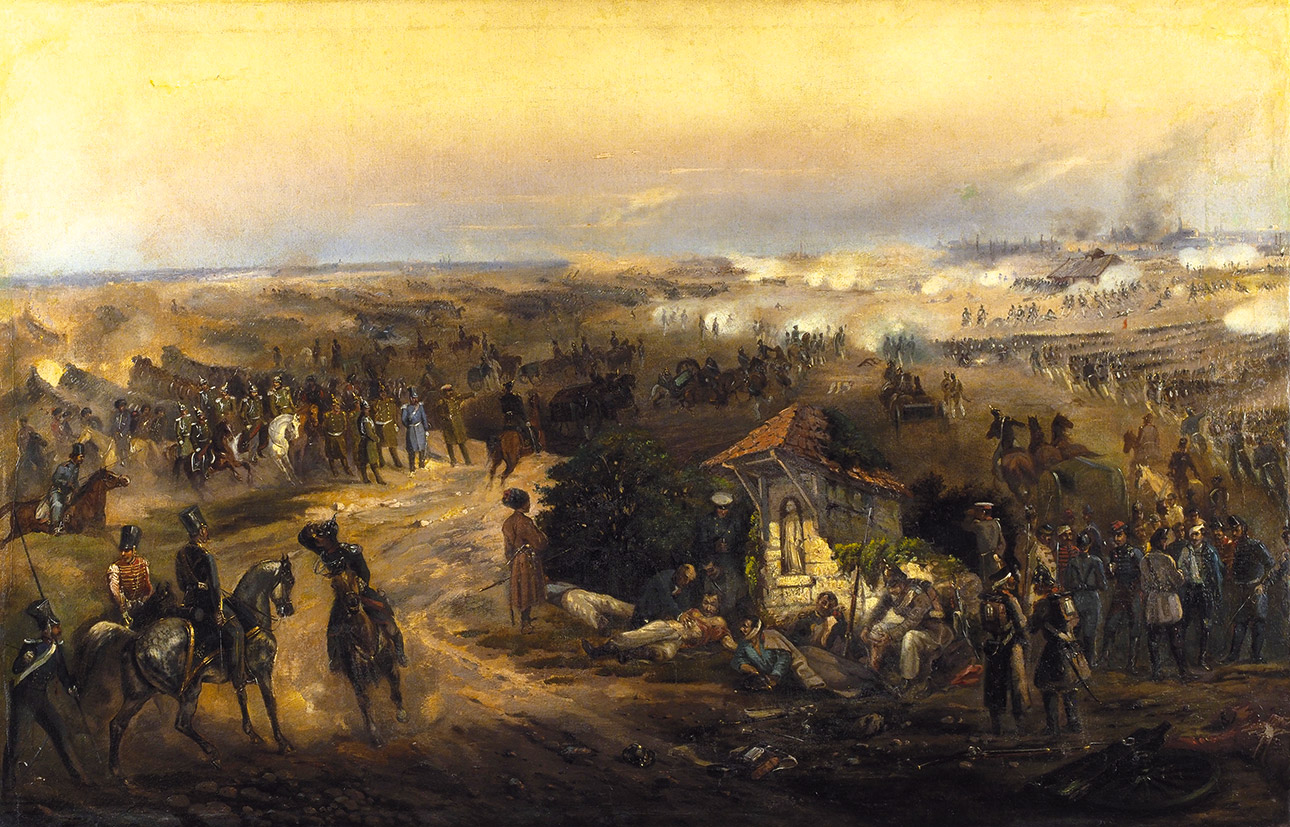
- The Battle of Debrecen (by Mihály Zichy): Battle of Debrecen
Date	31 July 1849
Location	Debrecen, Hungary
Result	Russian victory

Belligerents
Hungarian Revolutionary Army	Russian Empire

Commanders and leaders
József Nagysándor	Ivan Paskevich; Pavel Jakovlevich Kupriyanov (WIA)

Strength
Total: 11,338 men, 47 cannons I. corps: 8,838 men (61 infantry companies, 12 cavalry companies); 43 cannons Division of Col. János Korponay: 2,500 men (6+? infantry companies, 1 1/2 cavalry companies); 4 cannons	Total: 62,427 men, 301 cannons II. corps: 22,312 men (113 infantry companies, 33 cavalry companies); 122 cannons III. corps: 27,236 men (116 infantry companies, 44 cavalry companies); 112 cannons Other units: 12,879 men (59 infantry companies, 26 cavalry companies); 67 cannons

Casualties and losses
~1,901 men (dead, wounded and missing); 8 cannons	Total: 337 men (60 dead, 277 wounded); 205 wounded

The Battle of Debrecen was fought on August 2, 1849, between the Hungarian Revolutionary Army and forces of the Russian Empire, which intervened on behalf of the Austrian Empire to suppress the Hungarian revolution. On 30 July 1849, the commander of the Hungarian Army of the Northern Danube, General Artúr Görgei split his army in two, while he and the main part of his army marched towards Arad, he ordered to the I corps under the leadership of József Nagysándor to flank him from West against the Russians, by marching parallelly with his troops towards Debrecen. Nagysándor's I. corps was attacked and defeated by the hugely outnumbering Russian main army under Marshal Ivan Paskevich. This battle enabled Görgei to win a distance of several days from the Russian army, creating the possibility for him to join his armies with the Hungarian troops concentrated in Southern Hungary, and to defeat the Austrian main army of Field Marshal Julius Jacob von Haynau, before the Russians arrived. It was not Görgei's fault that this plan did not materialize.

== Background ==
After his retreat, between 17 and 29 July on the rout Vác-Balassagyarmat-Losonc-Rimaszombat-Miskolc-Tokaj, defeating in several defensive battles the Russian main forces, Czar, Nicholas I of Russia was impressed by Görgei's brilliant manoeuvers, comparing him twice to Napoleon, writing this to Paskevich:

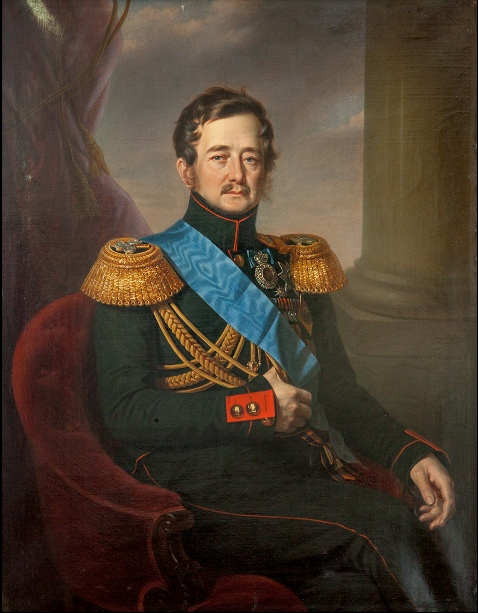
Ivan Paskevich in 1849

The fact that Görgei, after retreating from Komárom, got first around our right then around our left-wing, making such a huge circle, then he arrived south and united with the main troops, blows my mind. And he managed to do all these against your 120,000 brave and disciplined soldiers.

During Görgei's daring march eastwards towards the Tisza, on the left bank of the river, the detachment of Colonel János Korponay tried to protect it from the eventual Russian attempts to cross it. His troops were 3,660 men (according to other sources 3,000) with 4 cannons, but from the 3,280 infantry only 1,110 had firearms, the rest being equipped with straightened scythes and spears. On 25 July the Russian detachment of Duke Gorchakov arrived on the bank of the Tisza at Poroszló. Korponay's too weak detachment was unable to prevent the crossing of the Russian detachment (8000 infantry soldiers and unknown number of cavalrymen), but at least he tried to slow their crossing with his artillery, but the fire of the Russian cannons forced them to retreat. Despite Korponay burned the bridge at Poroszló, the Russian detachment crossed the Tisza, then occupied Balmazújváros, heading towards Debrecen. On 26 July Gorchakov took Tiszafüred, spending the whole day there. The Russian II. corps arrived that day at Mezőkövesd, crossing the Tisza on 27. The III. Russian corps arrived on 27 to Tiszafüred, while the IV. corps left Miskolc, marching towards the same town. The IV. corps of Cheodayev too left the region of Miskolc, and headed towards Tiszafüred. Paskevich enthrusted Lieutenant General Pavel Hristoforovich Grabbe and Cavalry General Dmitriy Yerofeyevich Osten-Sacken with the pursuit of the Hungarian troops.

Hearing that many of the Russian troops crossed on the left bank of the Tisza, Görgei too gave the order to his three corps to march towards the river in order to cross it. Lieutenant General Grabbe tried to stop this, but the III. corps of General Károly Leiningen-Westerburg repulsed the Russians in the Battle of Gesztely. At 29 July General Artúr Görgei crossed the river Tisza at Tokaj, planning to march to Southern Hungary to Bánát region, where, according to Hungarian Government's order, all the Hungarian forces had to meet. On 30 in Nyíregyháza he split his army in two. He ordered to General József Nagysándor's I. corps to march on the rout of Hajdúhadház-Debrecen-Derecske-Berettyóújfalu, as a flank guard from the West for his troops (III. and VII. corps) which marched on the Nagykálló-Nyíradony-Vámospércs-Nagyléta-Kismarja. Three factors explain this decision of Görgei. The first was that after the Battle of Vác from 15 to 17 July the only Hungarian corps which was kept out of the continuous fights was the I. corps, the second one was that in this way the feeding of the army was easier, and the troops could move more quickly.

After arriving to Hajdúhadház General Nagysándor received the notification from Colonel János Korponay, the leader of the Hungarian irregular forces from Tiszántúl, that he had to retreat to Debrecen after the Russians attacked him with 15,000 soldiers. Nagysándor sent a strong cavalry unit to Debrecen, to move from there towards Balmazújváros, and find the enemy, but to avoid any direct confrontation with the Russians, instead of this to keep an eye on them, and send him reports about their movements. The general then ordered to his troops to march to Debrecen at 10 p.m. The I. corps chief of staff Major István Pongrácz reported on 1. August to Görgei that, in the night before the vanguard of the Russians entered Balmazújváros, mentioning that according to the eyewitnesses they are not very numerous, thus Nagysándor should wait for them in Debrecen and enter in battle with them. The Central Operations Bureau agreed to Pongrácz's proposal, adding that after the I. corps repulse the Russians, they must continue their retreat on the designated rout.

== Prelude ==
At 8 a.m. on 2 August Pongrácz reported to the Central Operations Bureau that the I. corps arrived to Debrecen, and they are prepared to fight the 15,000 strong Russian troops, then, on the next day, to march towards Derecske. In Debrecen the detachment of irregulars led by Colonel János Korponay joined the I. corps.

The Hungarian cavalry units sent by Nagysándor towards Balmazújváros, met with an enemy cavalry unit, and finding them too strong, retreated to Debrecen. Then General Nagysándor, taking the lead of the Hungarian cavalry, attacked the Russian cavalry units, and chase them away.

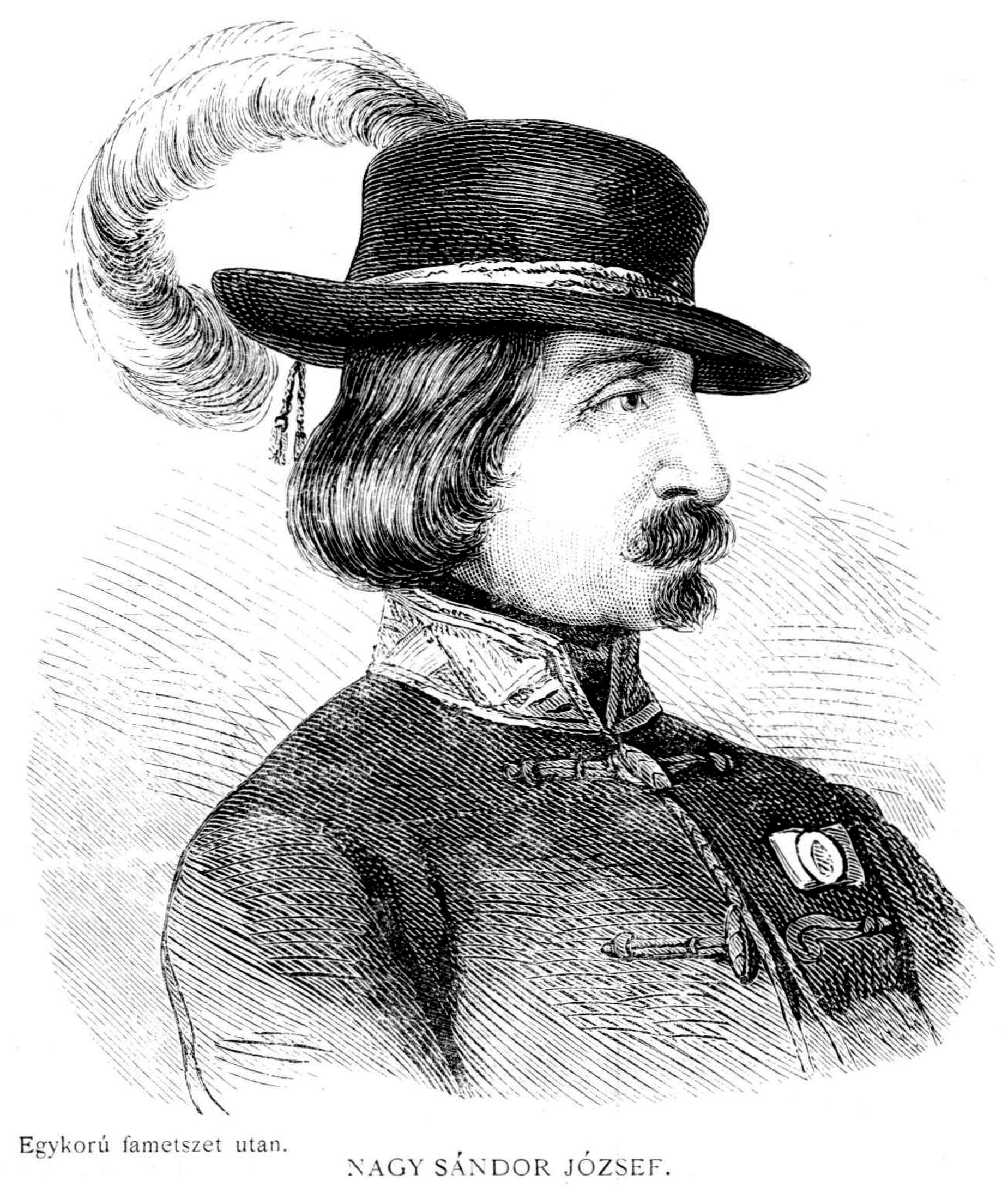
Nagysándor József

According to József Bánlaky it was Görgei's order to attack the enemy, no matter its size. According to Attila Horváth Görgei did not gave the order to Nagysándor to attack the enemy, but to resist to Russians if they attacked. The cause of this misunderstanding was that the chief of the staff of the I. corps, Major István Pongrácz, in his memoirs written 18 years after the events, remembered wrongly Görgei's order, writing in the newspaper called Hon that Görgei gave him the order to attack the Russians, while the order of his commander sent to him before the battle was only to try to withstand if the enemy attacked. According to Bánlaky Nagysándor discussed with his officers what to do next. Nagysándor and Máriássy sustained Görgei's order, the commander of the cavalry, Colonel István Mesterházy was unsure, Bobich wanted to fight only if the enemy attacked, while Korponay and Pongrácz were against the attack. Seeing this disagreement among his officers, Nagysándor decided not to attack the Russians, but to remain alert all day, and to retreat in silence during the night. According to Máriássy's memoirs, they rode with Nagysándor to the outposts, where they spoke with the officers of the Russian vanguards, who invited them to the five o’clock tea. After the muster parade of the outposts, at 11 a.m., Nagysándor gave up the command to Bobich, and together with Máriássy, Pongrácz and other officers he went in the city, to a restaurant, but they barely started the meal, when they heard the Russian gun shots, signaling the start of the battle, so they immediately rushed to their posts.

On 1 August Paskevich with his troops gathered at Csege, departed to Balmazújváros, after sending at Haynau's demand 4 companies of Uhlans with 50 Cossacks and 4 cannons towards Törökszentmiklós in order to threaten the back and side of the Hungarians. After arriving there, Paskevich sent one raiding party towards Hajdúböszörmény and another one towards Debrecen. The first raiding party did not found any Hungarians at Hajdúböszörmény, while the other found Hungarian troops to a mile from Balmazújváros. Hearing this Paskevich sent General David Osipovich Bebutov with two Muslim cavalry companies and one company of Caucasian riders towards Debrecen to learn more about the Hungarian troops there. On the dawn of 2 August, this unit reported that there are Hungarian troops in Debrecen, but they cannot say their exact numbers. Nagysándor too was unable to acquire precise information from Mesterházy's and his own cavalry raids and the small clashes with the Russian cavalry units, which ensued between them and Bubutov's troops. From the strength of Bebutov's raiders, he taught that only 15,000 Russian soldiers are heading toward Debrecen, so he decided to start a battle with them. Although he heard some reports that the Russians were much more numerous than this, around 30,000, he renounced sending another reconnaissance units to make sure about the strength of the enemy, which in reality was more than 62,000 soldiers and 298 guns. If he would have tried harder to find out the real strength of the enemy, he could have avoided this grave danger, and retreat in time. Paskevich departed towards Debrecen on 2 July in the morning in battle formation, with the II. corps on the right side of the road, while the III. corps on its left, on its outer flank with their cavalry divisions, and with the 12. infantry division with two subordinate cavalry regiments as a reserve.

=== Opposing forces ===
Nagysándor's information about the Russian troops size was wrong. Instead of a Russian detachment, he faced the main army (the II. and III. corps and the 12. infantry division), led by Marshal Ivan Paskevich, the Russian main commander. So his 11,300 ill-equipped soldiers faced at least 62,500 Russian elite troops.

The Hungarian army (Note: The Hungarian battle order is from 27 July 1849.)

I. corps;
Commander Major General József Nagysándor,
Chief of staff: Major István Pongrácz

The I. Hungarian corps led by General József Nagysándor, together with the division of Colonel János Korponay had in total 12,124 soldiers, 43 cannons, and 4 Congreve rockets.
Its important to mention that the bulk of Korponay's division was made of unarmed conscripts and guerillas without fire arms, which could not be used in the battle.

Detailed order of battle of the Hungarian army

Corps	Division	Unit	Leader	Company	Saddled horse	Traction horse	Cannon	Rocket	Number
I. Corps; Major General; József Nagysándor
I. Corps; Major General; József Nagysándor	Máriássy Division	17. Honvéd Battalion	Captain Gusztáv Kuppis	6	-	-	-	-	616
I. Corps; Major General; József Nagysándor	Máriássy Division	28. Honvéd Battalion	Major Dénes Huszóczy	6	32	11	-	-	836
I. Corps; Major General; József Nagysándor	Máriássy Division	34. Honvéd Battalion	Major János Várady	6	33	-	-	-	541
I. Corps; Major General; József Nagysándor	Máriássy Division	47. Honvéd Battalion	Major Kázmér Inkey	6	32	8	-	-	850
I. Corps; Major General; József Nagysándor	Máriássy Division	116. Honvéd Battalion	Major Joszip Czappan	6	-	-	-	-	699
I. Corps; Major General; József Nagysándor	Máriássy Division	4. six-pound infantry battery	Captain Teofil Lapinski	-	16	108	9	-	172
I. Corps; Major General; József Nagysándor	Máriássy Division	4. six-pound cavalry battery	Captain Ince Zerdahelyi	-	9	130	8	-	164
I. Corps; Major General; József Nagysándor	Máriássy Division	4. Congreve rocket ½ battery	Lieutenant Adolf Vidéki	-	3	16	-	4	35
I. Corps; Major General; József Nagysándor	Máriássy Division	Division total		30	125	273	17	4	3,913
I. Corps; Major General; József Nagysándor	Bobich Division	6. Honvéd Battalion	Lieutenant Colonel Gergely Szalkay	6	20	-	-	-	526
I. Corps; Major General; József Nagysándor	Bobich Division	26. Honvéd Battalion	Lieutenant Colonel Görgy Beöthy	6	20	8	-	-	660
I. Corps; Major General; József Nagysándor	Bobich Division	44. Honvéd Battalion	Captain Colonel Elek Horváth	6	22	-	-	-	733
I. Corps; Major General; József Nagysándor	Bobich Division	52. Honvéd Battalion	Major Lipót Stetina	6	18	24	-	-	611
I. Corps; Major General; József Nagysándor	Bobich Division	Cornidesz irregulars	Major Lajos Cornidesz	5	23	-	-	-	683
I. Corps; Major General; József Nagysándor	Bobich Division	15. six-pound infantry battery	Captain Márton Csányi	-	10	120	8	-	185
I. Corps; Major General; József Nagysándor	Bobich Division	3. six-pound infantry battery	Lieutenant Károly Kracher	-	14	91	8	-	156
I. Corps; Major General; József Nagysándor	Bobich Division	Division total		29	127	243	16	-	3,554
I. Corps; Major General; József Nagysándor	Mesterházy Cavalry Division	1. "Imperial" Hussar Regiment	Lieutenant Colonel Alajos Sebő	8	758	22	-	-	778
I. Corps; Major General; József Nagysándor	Mesterházy Cavalry Division	3. "Coburg" Hussar Regiment	Major Imre Új	4	408	-	-	-	397
I. Corps; Major General; József Nagysándor	Mesterházy Cavalry Division	1. six-pound cavalry battery	Lieutenant Vilmos Voigt	-	14	102	6	-	147
I. Corps; Major General; József Nagysándor	Mesterházy Cavalry Division	Division total		12	1,180	124	6	-	1322
I. Corps; Major General; József Nagysándor	Corps-adjacent units	Companies of the Sapper division	Captain Lipót Kiss	2	9	12	-	-	214
I. Corps; Major General; József Nagysándor	Corps-adjacent units	Defense Battalion of Hont County	Major Lipót Stetina	5	-	-	-	-	518
I. Corps; Major General; József Nagysándor	Corps-adjacent units	Reserve ammunition	?	-	14	136	-	-	162
I. Corps; Major General; József Nagysándor	Corps-adjacent units	Total		7	23	148	-	-	894
I. Corps; Major General; József Nagysándor	Corps total		78	1,455	788	39	4	9,683	
	Korponay Division	96. Honvéd Battalion	Major Arnold Balka	6	-	-	-	-	c.700
	Korponay Division	1 platoon of the 14. Hussar Regiment	-	-	c.50	-	-	-	c.50
	Korponay Division	1 company of the 7. Hussar Regiment	Captain Georg von Amsberg	1	c.100	-	-	-	c.100
	Korponay Division	Artillery	-		-	-	4	-	c.50
	Korponay Division	Guerillas without fire arms	-	-	-	-	-	-	c.2,380
	Korponay Division	Division total		-	-	-	4	-	c.3,280
Army total				85	1,605	788	43	4	12,186

The Russian army

Commander Field Marshal Ivan Paskevich,
Chief of staff: General of the Artillery Mikhail Dmitrievich Gorchakov
Commander of the artillery: General of the Artillery Yakov Yakovlevich Gillenschmidt
Ataman of the Cossack Regiments: Lieutenant General Mikhail Mikhaylovich Kuznetsov.

The Russian army was composed of the II., III., and IV. corps, having in total 62,383 soldiers and 298 cannons. They outnumbered the Hungarians five to one regarding the number of the soldiers, and more than six to one regarding the number of the cannons.

Detailed order of battle of the Russian army

Corps	Division	Brigade	Unit	Infantry battalion	Cavalry company	Cannon	Number
II. Corps; Lieutenant General Pavel Jakovlevich Kupriyanov
II. Corps; Lieutenant General Pavel Jakovlevich Kupriyanov	2. light cavalry division Lieutenant General Vladimir Grigoryevich Glazenap	1. brigade Major General Nikolai Savvich Osorgin	3. (Archduke Nikolai) uhlan regiment from Smolensk	-	-	-	-
II. Corps; Lieutenant General Pavel Jakovlevich Kupriyanov	2. light cavalry division Lieutenant General Vladimir Grigoryevich Glazenap	1. brigade Major General Nikolai Savvich Osorgin	4. uhlan regiment from Harkov	-	-	-	-
II. Corps; Lieutenant General Pavel Jakovlevich Kupriyanov	2. light cavalry division Lieutenant General Vladimir Grigoryevich Glazenap	2. brigade Major General Alexandr Fyodorovich Baggovut	3. (Archduchess Olga) hussar regiment from Yelysavethrad	-	-	-	-
II. Corps; Lieutenant General Pavel Jakovlevich Kupriyanov	2. light cavalry division Lieutenant General Vladimir Grigoryevich Glazenap	2. brigade Major General Alexandr Fyodorovich Baggovut	4. (King of Hannover) hussar regiment from Lubny	-	-	-	-
II. Corps; Lieutenant General Pavel Jakovlevich Kupriyanov	2. light cavalry division Lieutenant General Vladimir Grigoryevich Glazenap	Division total		-	28	-	3,308
II. Corps; Lieutenant General Pavel Jakovlevich Kupriyanov	4. infantry division Lieutenant General Anton Mihaylovics Karlovich	1. brigade Major General Pavel Nikolayevich Lyubavskiy	8. (Adjutant general Volkonsky) infantry regiment from Belozersk	-	-	-	-
II. Corps; Lieutenant General Pavel Jakovlevich Kupriyanov	4. infantry division Lieutenant General Anton Mihaylovics Karlovich	1. brigade Major General Pavel Nikolayevich Lyubavskiy	7. infantry regiment from Olonets	-	-	-	-
II. Corps; Lieutenant General Pavel Jakovlevich Kupriyanov	4. infantry division Lieutenant General Anton Mihaylovics Karlovich	2. brigade Major General Fyodor Karlovich Dresern	7. Jäger regiment from Shlisselburg	-	-	-	-
II. Corps; Lieutenant General Pavel Jakovlevich Kupriyanov	4. infantry division Lieutenant General Anton Mihaylovics Karlovich	2. brigade Major General Fyodor Karlovich Dresern	8. Jäger regiment from Ladoga	-	-	-	-
II. Corps; Lieutenant General Pavel Jakovlevich Kupriyanov	4. infantry division Lieutenant General Anton Mihaylovics Karlovich	Division total		13	-	-	7,159
II. Corps; Lieutenant General Pavel Jakovlevich Kupriyanov	5. infantry division Lieutenant General Ivan Mihayovich Labintsev	1. brigade Major General Dmitriy Dmitriyevich Selvan	9. (Grand Duke Vladimir) infantry regiment from Arkhangelsk	-	-	-	-
II. Corps; Lieutenant General Pavel Jakovlevich Kupriyanov	5. infantry division Lieutenant General Ivan Mihayovich Labintsev	1. brigade Major General Dmitriy Dmitriyevich Selvan	10. infantry regiment from Vologda	-	-	-	-
II. Corps; Lieutenant General Pavel Jakovlevich Kupriyanov	5. infantry division Lieutenant General Ivan Mihayovich Labintsev	2. brigade Major General Ignatiy Andreyevich Meier	9. Jäger regiment from Kostroma	-	-	-	-
II. Corps; Lieutenant General Pavel Jakovlevich Kupriyanov	5. infantry division Lieutenant General Ivan Mihayovich Labintsev	2. brigade Major General Ignatiy Andreyevich Meier	10. Jäger regiment from Halych	-	-	-	-
II. Corps; Lieutenant General Pavel Jakovlevich Kupriyanov	5. infantry division Lieutenant General Ivan Mihayovich Labintsev	Division total		14	-	-	8,179
II. Corps; Lieutenant General Pavel Jakovlevich Kupriyanov	2. artillery division Lieutenant General Adam Yosipovich Serjputovskiy	2. cavalry artillery brigade Colonel Stepan Viktorovich Komsin	3. cavalry light battery	-	-	-	-
II. Corps; Lieutenant General Pavel Jakovlevich Kupriyanov	2. artillery division Lieutenant General Adam Yosipovich Serjputovskiy	2. cavalry artillery brigade Colonel Stepan Viktorovich Komsin	4. cavalry light battery	-	-	-	-
II. Corps; Lieutenant General Pavel Jakovlevich Kupriyanov	2. artillery division Lieutenant General Adam Yosipovich Serjputovskiy	2. cavalry artillery brigade Colonel Stepan Viktorovich Komsin	Brigade total	-	-	16	387
II. Corps; Lieutenant General Pavel Jakovlevich Kupriyanov	2. artillery division Lieutenant General Adam Yosipovich Serjputovskiy	4. Camp Artillery Brigade; Colonel Bezak	1. heavy artillery battery	-	-	-	-
II. Corps; Lieutenant General Pavel Jakovlevich Kupriyanov	2. artillery division Lieutenant General Adam Yosipovich Serjputovskiy	4. Camp Artillery Brigade; Colonel Bezak	2. heavyt artillery battery	-	-	-	-
II. Corps; Lieutenant General Pavel Jakovlevich Kupriyanov	2. artillery division Lieutenant General Adam Yosipovich Serjputovskiy	4. Camp Artillery Brigade; Colonel Bezak	1. light artillery battery	-	-	-	-
II. Corps; Lieutenant General Pavel Jakovlevich Kupriyanov	2. artillery division Lieutenant General Adam Yosipovich Serjputovskiy	4. Camp Artillery Brigade; Colonel Bezak	2. light artillery battery	-	-	-	-
II. Corps; Lieutenant General Pavel Jakovlevich Kupriyanov	2. artillery division Lieutenant General Adam Yosipovich Serjputovskiy	4. Camp Artillery Brigade; Colonel Bezak	Brigade total	-	-	42	888
II. Corps; Lieutenant General Pavel Jakovlevich Kupriyanov	2. artillery division Lieutenant General Adam Yosipovich Serjputovskiy	4. Camp Artillery Brigade; Major General Eduard Fyodorovich Gagman	3. heavy artillery battery	-	-	-	-
II. Corps; Lieutenant General Pavel Jakovlevich Kupriyanov	2. artillery division Lieutenant General Adam Yosipovich Serjputovskiy	4. Camp Artillery Brigade; Major General Eduard Fyodorovich Gagman	3. light artillery battery	-	-	-	-
II. Corps; Lieutenant General Pavel Jakovlevich Kupriyanov	2. artillery division Lieutenant General Adam Yosipovich Serjputovskiy	4. Camp Artillery Brigade; Major General Eduard Fyodorovich Gagman	4. light artillery battery	-	-	-	-
II. Corps; Lieutenant General Pavel Jakovlevich Kupriyanov	2. artillery division Lieutenant General Adam Yosipovich Serjputovskiy	4. Camp Artillery Brigade; Major General Eduard Fyodorovich Gagman	5. light artillery battery	-	-	-	-
II. Corps; Lieutenant General Pavel Jakovlevich Kupriyanov	2. artillery division Lieutenant General Adam Yosipovich Serjputovskiy	4. Camp Artillery Brigade; Major General Eduard Fyodorovich Gagman	Brigade total	-	-	48	801
II. Corps; Lieutenant General Pavel Jakovlevich Kupriyanov	2. artillery division Lieutenant General Adam Yosipovich Serjputovskiy		Train battalion	-	-	-	?
II. Corps; Lieutenant General Pavel Jakovlevich Kupriyanov	2. artillery division Lieutenant General Adam Yosipovich Serjputovskiy	Division total		-	-	106	2,076
II. Corps; Lieutenant General Pavel Jakovlevich Kupriyanov	Corps-adjacent units		Gendarmes platoon	-	-	-	29
II. Corps; Lieutenant General Pavel Jakovlevich Kupriyanov	Corps-adjacent units		Shooter battalion	1	-	-	535
II. Corps; Lieutenant General Pavel Jakovlevich Kupriyanov	Corps-adjacent units		1 company of the 2. sapper battalion	-	-	-	319
II. Corps; Lieutenant General Pavel Jakovlevich Kupriyanov	Corps-adjacent units		5 sotnias of the 32 Don Cossack regiment	-	5	-	411
II. Corps; Lieutenant General Pavel Jakovlevich Kupriyanov	Corps-adjacent units		1 Don reserve battery	-	-	8	159
II. Corps; Lieutenant General Pavel Jakovlevich Kupriyanov	Corps-adjacent units	11. Camp artillery brigade	3. light battery	-	-	-	-
II. Corps; Lieutenant General Pavel Jakovlevich Kupriyanov	Corps-adjacent units	11. Camp artillery brigade	4. light battery	-	-	-	-
II. Corps; Lieutenant General Pavel Jakovlevich Kupriyanov	Corps-adjacent units	11. Camp artillery brigade	Brigade total	-	-	8	137
II. Corps; Lieutenant General Pavel Jakovlevich Kupriyanov	Corps-adjacent units	Total		1+?	5	16	1,590
II. Corps; Lieutenant General Pavel Jakovlevich Kupriyanov	Corps total			28	38	16	22,312
III. Corps; Lieutenant General Friedrich von Rüdiger
III. Corps; Lieutenant General Friedrich von Rüdiger	3. light cavalry division Lieutenant General Ivan Petrovich Offenberg	1. brigade Major General Ivan Vasilyevich Kohanovich	5. (Austrian Duke Albrecht) Lithuanian uhlan regiment	-	-	-	-
III. Corps; Lieutenant General Friedrich von Rüdiger	3. light cavalry division Lieutenant General Ivan Petrovich Offenberg	1. brigade Major General Ivan Vasilyevich Kohanovich	6. (Grand Duke Konstantin of Volhynia) uhlan regiment	-	-	-	-
III. Corps; Lieutenant General Friedrich von Rüdiger	3. light cavalry division Lieutenant General Ivan Petrovich Offenberg	2. brigade Major General Nikolai Ivanovich Burgard	5. (Friedrich Duke of Hessen-Kassel) hussar regiment from Mariupol	-	-	-	-
III. Corps; Lieutenant General Friedrich von Rüdiger	3. light cavalry division Lieutenant General Ivan Petrovich Offenberg	2. brigade Major General Nikolai Ivanovich Burgard	6. (Count Radetzky) hussar regiment from Byelorussia	-	-	-	-
III. Corps; Lieutenant General Friedrich von Rüdiger	3. light cavalry division Lieutenant General Ivan Petrovich Offenberg	Division total		-	32	-	3,641
III. Corps; Lieutenant General Friedrich von Rüdiger	7. infantry division Lieutenant General Petr Fyodorovich von Kaufman	1. brigade Major General Fyodor Ivanovich Trusov	13. (Duke of Wellington) infantry regiment from Smolensk	-	-	-	-
III. Corps; Lieutenant General Friedrich von Rüdiger	7. infantry division Lieutenant General Petr Fyodorovich von Kaufman	1. brigade Major General Fyodor Ivanovich Trusov	14. infantry regiment from Mogilev	-	-	-	-
III. Corps; Lieutenant General Friedrich von Rüdiger	7. infantry division Lieutenant General Petr Fyodorovich von Kaufman	2. brigade Major General Karp Matveyvich Rafalovich	13. Jäger regiment from Vitebsk	-	-	-	-
III. Corps; Lieutenant General Friedrich von Rüdiger	7. infantry division Lieutenant General Petr Fyodorovich von Kaufman	2. brigade Major General Karp Matveyvich Rafalovich	14. Jäger regiment from Polotsk	-	-	-	-
III. Corps; Lieutenant General Friedrich von Rüdiger	7. infantry division Lieutenant General Petr Fyodorovich von Kaufman	Division total		16	-	-	9,158
III. Corps; Lieutenant General Friedrich von Rüdiger	8. infantry division Lieutenant General Anton Grigoryevich Lisetskiy	1. brigade Major General Yegor Andrejevich Kobyakov	16. infantry regiment from Poltava	-	-	-	-
III. Corps; Lieutenant General Friedrich von Rüdiger	8. infantry division Lieutenant General Anton Grigoryevich Lisetskiy	2. brigade Major General Alexandr Ivanovich Popov	15. Jäger regiment from Alexopol	-	-	-	-
III. Corps; Lieutenant General Friedrich von Rüdiger	8. infantry division Lieutenant General Anton Grigoryevich Lisetskiy	2. brigade Major General Alexandr Ivanovich Popov	16. Jäger regiment from Kremenchuk	-	-	-	-
III. Corps; Lieutenant General Friedrich von Rüdiger	8. infantry division Lieutenant General Anton Grigoryevich Lisetskiy	Division total		10	-	-	7,044
III. Corps; Lieutenant General Friedrich von Rüdiger	3. artillery division Major General Ivan Petrovich Miller	3. cavalry artillery brigade Colonel Karl Ilyich Berends	5. cavalry light battery	-	-	-	-
III. Corps; Lieutenant General Friedrich von Rüdiger	3. artillery division Major General Ivan Petrovich Miller	3. cavalry artillery brigade Colonel Karl Ilyich Berends	6. cavalry light battery	-	-	-	-
III. Corps; Lieutenant General Friedrich von Rüdiger	3. artillery division Major General Ivan Petrovich Miller	3. cavalry artillery brigade Colonel Karl Ilyich Berends	Brigade total	-	-	16	316
III. Corps; Lieutenant General Friedrich von Rüdiger	3. artillery division Major General Ivan Petrovich Miller	7. Camp Artillery Brigade; Colonel Maydely	1. heavy artillery battery	-	-	-	-
III. Corps; Lieutenant General Friedrich von Rüdiger	3. artillery division Major General Ivan Petrovich Miller	7. Camp Artillery Brigade; Colonel Maydely	2. heavy artillery battery	-	-	-	-
III. Corps; Lieutenant General Friedrich von Rüdiger	3. artillery division Major General Ivan Petrovich Miller	7. Camp Artillery Brigade; Colonel Maydely	1. light artillery battery	-	-	-	-
III. Corps; Lieutenant General Friedrich von Rüdiger	3. artillery division Major General Ivan Petrovich Miller	7. Camp Artillery Brigade; Colonel Maydely	2. heavy artillery battery	-	-	-	-
III. Corps; Lieutenant General Friedrich von Rüdiger	3. artillery division Major General Ivan Petrovich Miller	7. Camp Artillery Brigade; Colonel Maydely	Brigade total	-	-	48	1,013
III. Corps; Lieutenant General Friedrich von Rüdiger	3. artillery division Major General Ivan Petrovich Miller	8. Camp Artillery Brigade; Colonel Alexandrov'	3. heavy artillery battery	-	-	-	-
III. Corps; Lieutenant General Friedrich von Rüdiger	3. artillery division Major General Ivan Petrovich Miller	8. Camp Artillery Brigade; Colonel Alexandrov'	3. light artillery battery	-	-	-	-
III. Corps; Lieutenant General Friedrich von Rüdiger	3. artillery division Major General Ivan Petrovich Miller	8. Camp Artillery Brigade; Colonel Alexandrov'	4. light artillery battery	-	-	-	-
III. Corps; Lieutenant General Friedrich von Rüdiger	3. artillery division Major General Ivan Petrovich Miller	8. Camp Artillery Brigade; Colonel Alexandrov'	5. light artillery battery	-	-	-	-
III. Corps; Lieutenant General Friedrich von Rüdiger	3. artillery division Major General Ivan Petrovich Miller	8. Camp Artillery Brigade; Colonel Alexandrov'	Brigade total	-	-	48	885
III. Corps; Lieutenant General Friedrich von Rüdiger	3. artillery division Major General Ivan Petrovich Miller		Train battalion	-	-	-	?
III. Corps; Lieutenant General Friedrich von Rüdiger	3. artillery division Major General Ivan Petrovich Miller	Division total		-	-	112	2,214
III. Corps; Lieutenant General Friedrich von Rüdiger	Corps-adjacent units		3. shooter battalion	1	-	-	489
III. Corps; Lieutenant General Friedrich von Rüdiger	Corps-adjacent units		3. sapper battalion	1	-	-	616
III. Corps; Lieutenant General Friedrich von Rüdiger	Corps-adjacent units		17. infantry regiment from Yelets	-	-	-	2,229
III. Corps; Lieutenant General Friedrich von Rüdiger	Corps-adjacent units	Cossack units	6 sotnias of the 15 Don Cossack regiment	-	6	-	-
III. Corps; Lieutenant General Friedrich von Rüdiger	Corps-adjacent units	Cossack units	6 sotnias of the 46 Don Cossack regiment	-	6	-	-
III. Corps; Lieutenant General Friedrich von Rüdiger	Corps-adjacent units	Cossack units	Total	-	12	-	1,208
III. Corps; Lieutenant General Friedrich von Rüdiger	Corps-adjacent units		7. mobile battery backup	-	-	-	294
III. Corps; Lieutenant General Friedrich von Rüdiger	Corps-adjacent units		17. fast moving battery backup	-	-	-	299
III. Corps; Lieutenant General Friedrich von Rüdiger	Corps-adjacent units	Total		2	12	-	5,135
III. Corps; Lieutenant General Friedrich von Rüdiger	Corps total			28	44	112	27,192
IV. Corps; Infantry General General Mikhail Ivanovich Cheodayev
IV. Corps; Infantry General General Mikhail Ivanovich Cheodayev	4. light cavalry division Lieutenant General Korniliy Korniliyevich Zass	Combined brigade	7. uhlan regiment of Voznesensk	-	-	-	-
IV. Corps; Infantry General General Mikhail Ivanovich Cheodayev	4. light cavalry division Lieutenant General Korniliy Korniliyevich Zass	Combined brigade	6. (Grand Duke Ferdinand) uhlan regiment of Izyum	-	-	-	-
IV. Corps; Infantry General General Mikhail Ivanovich Cheodayev	4. light cavalry division Lieutenant General Korniliy Korniliyevich Zass	Combined brigade	Brigade total	-	-	-	2,035
IV. Corps; Infantry General General Mikhail Ivanovich Cheodayev	4. light cavalry division Lieutenant General Korniliy Korniliyevich Zass	4. cavalry artillery brigade; Colonel Stepan Alexandrovich Hrulyov	7. light cavalry battery	-	-	8	194
IV. Corps; Infantry General General Mikhail Ivanovich Cheodayev	4. light cavalry division Lieutenant General Korniliy Korniliyevich Zass	12. camp artillery brigade Major General Berezin	4. heavy battery	-	-	-	-
IV. Corps; Infantry General General Mikhail Ivanovich Cheodayev	4. light cavalry division Lieutenant General Korniliy Korniliyevich Zass	12. camp artillery brigade Major General Berezin	6. light battery	-	-	-	-
IV. Corps; Infantry General General Mikhail Ivanovich Cheodayev	4. light cavalry division Lieutenant General Korniliy Korniliyevich Zass	12. camp artillery brigade Major General Berezin	7. light battery	-	-	-	-
IV. Corps; Infantry General General Mikhail Ivanovich Cheodayev	4. light cavalry division Lieutenant General Korniliy Korniliyevich Zass	12. camp artillery brigade Major General Berezin	8. light battery	-	-	-	-
IV. Corps; Infantry General General Mikhail Ivanovich Cheodayev	4. light cavalry division Lieutenant General Korniliy Korniliyevich Zass	12. camp artillery brigade Major General Berezin	Brigade total	-	-	48	857
IV. Corps; Infantry General General Mikhail Ivanovich Cheodayev	4. light cavalry division Lieutenant General Korniliy Korniliyevich Zass	Division total		-	-	56	3,086
IV. Corps; Infantry General General Mikhail Ivanovich Cheodayev	12. infantry division Lieutenant General Hristyan Nikolayevich Buschen	1. brigade Major General Pavel Sergeievich Volodimirov	32. infantry regiment of Azov	-	-	-	-
IV. Corps; Infantry General General Mikhail Ivanovich Cheodayev	12. infantry division Lieutenant General Hristyan Nikolayevich Buschen	1. brigade Major General Pavel Sergeievich Volodimirov	24. infantry regiment from Dnyeper	-	-	-	-
IV. Corps; Infantry General General Mikhail Ivanovich Cheodayev	12. infantry division Lieutenant General Hristyan Nikolayevich Buschen	2. brigade Major General Ivan Maximovich Marin	23. Jäger regiment from Ukraine	-	-	-	-
IV. Corps; Infantry General General Mikhail Ivanovich Cheodayev	12. infantry division Lieutenant General Hristyan Nikolayevich Buschen	2. brigade Major General Ivan Maximovich Marin	24. Jäger regiment from Odesa	-	-	-	-
IV. Corps; Infantry General General Mikhail Ivanovich Cheodayev	12. infantry division Lieutenant General Hristyan Nikolayevich Buschen		Train battalion	-	-	-	-
IV. Corps; Infantry General General Mikhail Ivanovich Cheodayev	12. infantry division Lieutenant General Hristyan Nikolayevich Buschen	Division total		14 ¾	-	-	8493
IV. Corps; Infantry General General Mikhail Ivanovich Cheodayev	Corps-adjacent units		Gendarmes regiment	-	-	-	141
IV. Corps; Infantry General General Mikhail Ivanovich Cheodayev	Corps-adjacent units	Cavalry units	4 sotnias of the combined irregular cavalry regiment from Caucasus	-	4	-	-
IV. Corps; Infantry General General Mikhail Ivanovich Cheodayev	Corps-adjacent units	Cavalry units	6 sotnias of the Transcaucasian Muslim Regiment	-	6	-	-
IV. Corps; Infantry General General Mikhail Ivanovich Cheodayev	Corps-adjacent units	Cavalry units	Total	-	10	-	921
IV. Corps; Infantry General General Mikhail Ivanovich Cheodayev	Corps-adjacent units		2. reserve battery from the Don	-	-	8	215
IV. Corps; Infantry General General Mikhail Ivanovich Cheodayev	Corps-adjacent units		Austrian half Congreve rocket battery	-	-	½	23
IV. Corps; Infantry General General Mikhail Ivanovich Cheodayev	Corps-adjacent units	Total		-	10	8 ½	1,300
IV. Corps; Infantry General General Mikhail Ivanovich Cheodayev	Corps total			14 ¾	10	64 ½	12,879
Grand total				70 ¾	92	298	62,383

=== The battlefield and deployment of the troops ===
On the western side of Debrecen, about 1000 paces to the west from the gates of the city, between the Köntös and Csige gardens along the road to Balmazújváros, stretched a long dam called the Köntös dam.

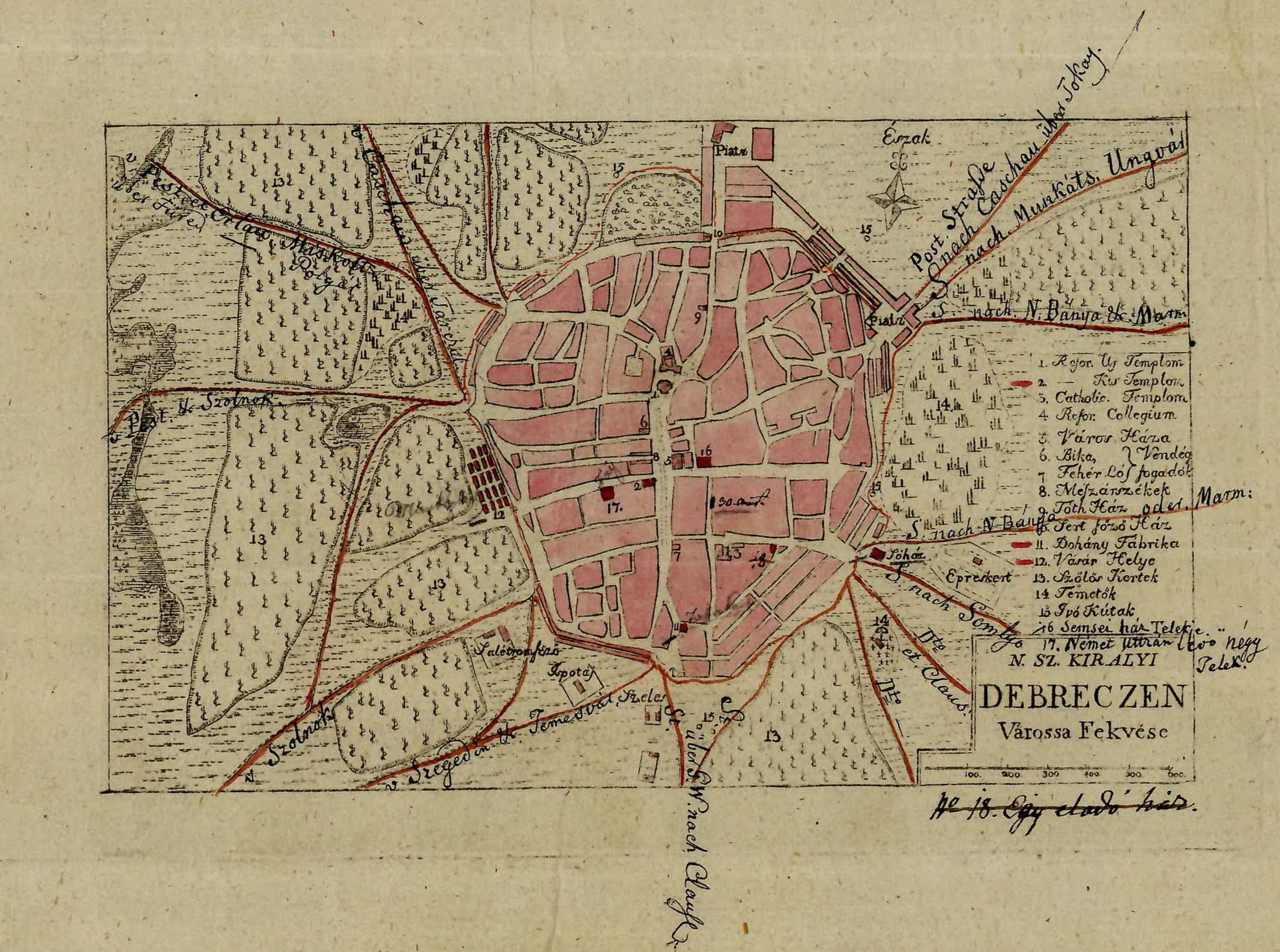
Debrecen in 1824

This dam and the road itself cut a valley to the north and south in two valleys. The valley ends in the north at the Great Forest, in the south stretched far from the dam until the present-day main road No 4. On the portion of the valley close to the city lay vineyards bordered by main roads, west from it lay a chain of hills and mounds. North of Köntösgát there were pits used by the inhabitants of the town to make tile and brick. This area was called Kokasló. West of the valley, lay pastures, followed along the road by small fields, and further away some farms. And beyond that, as far as the eye can see, on both sides of the road to Balmazújváros, there were huge cornfields that had grown particularly tall that year. The Russians mentioned them as taller than the tip of the lances of their uhlans. They could create problems for both sides: on the one hand, it kept the movement of troops hidden from the eyes of the opponent, but on the other hand, it greatly facilitated the possibility of surprise.

The historian Róbert Hermann and Attila Horváth point out that Nagysándor deployed his troops, not in a very lucky fashion. If Nagysándor wanted to retreat safely towards Derecske, after forcing the Russians, with the shootings of his artillery, to deploy their troops for battle and, in this way delay their pursuit, he would have deployed his corps on the southwestern part of the city. Instead of this Nagysándor deployed his troops in a line in front of the city. He deployed on the left flank the infantry division of 4,500 soldiers led by Colonel János Máriássy and 16 cannons. Máriássy managed to hide his division behind the hills and mounds which lay in front of them. The center stretching from the Köntös dam to Kokasló was occupied by the 1,500-strong infantry division and 6 cannons of Lieutenant colonel János Bobich. The brick pits from Kokasló were defended by the 6. Honvéd battalion and the Defense Battalion of Hont County with 3 cannons, while the Köntös garden was held by 3 battalions and 3 cannons. On the right flank the Korponay division was placed from Kokasló to the Nyulas taproom with around 2,500 weak infantry, which partially lacked firearms, supported by the newly formed 96. Honvéd battalion, 12 cannons and 1 ½ hussar company. In the large forested area from the north of the town, called Nagyerdő (Great Forest) was sent only 2 companies of the 89. Honvéd battalion and a platoon of the 14. Lehel hussar regiment ordered to make big noise, in order to "confuse the enemy". The vanguard was made by 4 companies of the 1. Imperial hussar regiment. Nagysándor placed 4 companies of the 8. Hussar Regiment, on the left, another four on the right wing, while the remaining 4 companies he kept as reserve, together with a battalion of militia armed with lances, probably from the Korponay division. In front of his lines the cornfield blocked his view, while on the right flank he left the Debrecen woods (called Nagyerdő) almost completely unoccupied, which enabled the Russians to deploy their troops and encircle the right wing undetected.

== Battle ==
When the Russian army arrived to the high cornfields in front of Debrecen, Paskevich ordered his troops in marching formation, with the 3. light cavalry division as vanguard. Preparing for the battle, General Nagysándor sent the luggage of his troops to Derecske, then the Hungarian artillery started to shoot at the Russians, who stopped their advance and prepared the 5. and 6. cavalry batteries to respond to them.

The II. corps was on the right side of the main road, the III. corps on the left side, while the cavalry divisions of these corps were placed on the wings of the Russian battle formation, while the Muslim cavalry regiment and the Mountain companies from the Caucasus rode on the vanguard. The 12. infantry division of the IV. corps and the combined 4. light cavalry division remained in reserve. In front of Debrecen the Russians were facing the tall cornfield on both sides of the road, so they were forced to "dismantle" their battle formation, and enter form marching columns. Paskevich sent the 3. light cavalry division ahead to cover the infantries deployment.

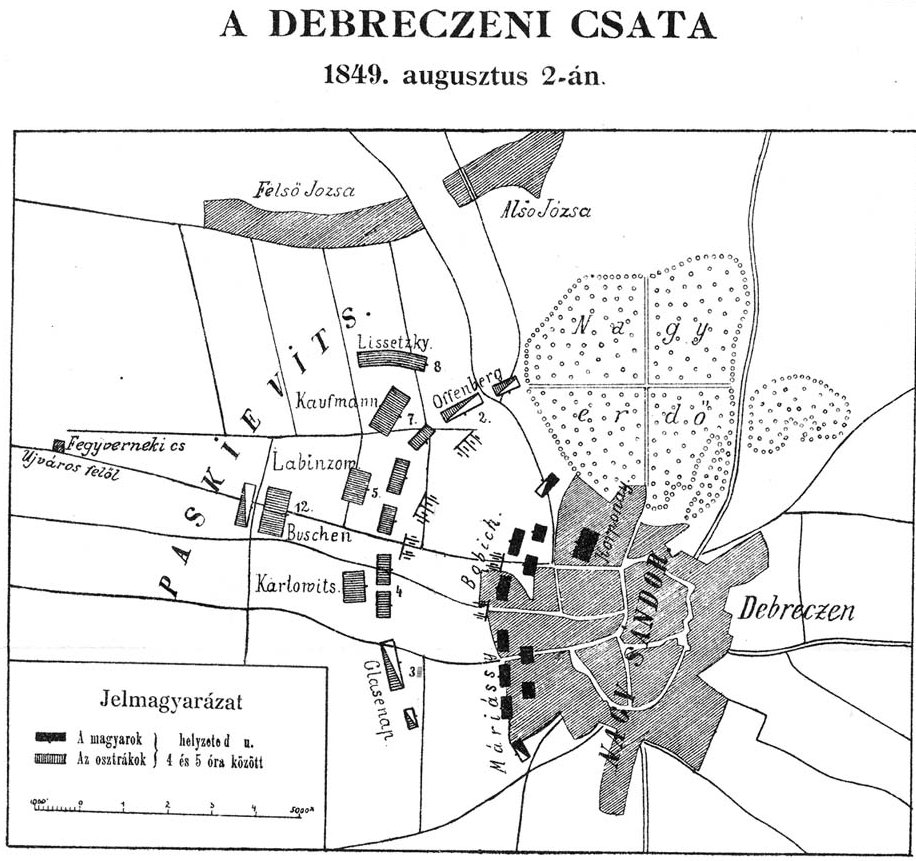
Map of the Battle of Debrecen (1849) by József Bánlaky

At 1:30 p.m., when the Russian infantry made a short resting, then the Russian army started to deploy, under the Hungarian gunfire, as follows. The 5. Infantry Division in the first line, the 4. was behind them; the 7. and 8. divisions were right to them, one behind the other, and the outer section of the right wing was made up by the 2. Light Cavalry Division.

the Muslim cavalry riding in front of the army spotted at the tavern from Fegyvernek, at a couple of km. paces in front of Debrecen, 4 hussar companies, and 2 guns (the Hungarian vanguard). Lieutenant General Offenberg sent the 6. (Grand Duke Konstantin of Volhynia) uhlan regiment to attack them, but the hussars retreated behind the Hungarian lines, to cover the Bobich division. The pursuing Russians were cleverly drawn by the hussars toward the hidden Hungarian artillery. On response to the fire of the Hungarian artillery the 5. and the 6. light cavalry batteries of the 3. light cavalry regiment and the Austrian rocket battery, covered by the 5. (Austrian Duke Albrecht) Lithuanian uhlan regiment, unlimbered and started to shoot rapidly towards the supposed positions of the Hungarian artillery and infantry. The Hungarian artillery did an excellent job, causing important losses to the two Russian cavalry batteries and to the uhlans, destroying many guns, and killing many horses, repulseing the attack of the 3. Russian light cavalry regiment, making Paskevich think that the Hungarians have large caliber (12-pounder) cannons, from which he took the wrong conclusion that he faced Görgei's full army. This made the Russian main commander to be, for a while, uncertain of what to do next.

This situation, which caused confusion in the Russian army, was a very favorable opportunity for the Hungarian army to retreat. Colonel János Máriássy and Colonel János Korponay went to General Nagysándor and urged him to use this favorable situation to retreat, saying also that Görgei's troops reached Nagyléta, so the I. corps accomplished its task to repulse the enemy attack and won time for the rest of the army to avoid the Russian encirclement. They also pointed that when the Russian infantry will finish its deployment, it will be much more dangerous for the Hungarian army to retreat without heavy losses. But Nagysándor was still thinking that he faced only 15,000 Russian soldiers, believing that he can win a victory against them.

At 1:55 p.m. the Russian artillery arrived on the battlefield and started to deploy. The 5. infantry division took position behind the Russian artillery. The 3., 4. and 5. light batteries of the artillery brigade of the 5. division replaced the batteries of the light cavalry which suffered important losses during the fight with the Hungarian batteries. The two cavalry batteries which were replaced were sent on the left wing to the edge of the Nagyerdő Forest to reinforce the 3. light infantry division. Behind the 5. infantry division the 4. infantry division was positioned, being deployed later for the attack to the right of the 5. division, its 7. infantry regiment of Olonets, the 8. Jäger regiment from Ladoga, with the 2. light and 2. heavy artillery batteries and the 2. sapper battalion from the adjacent units of the corps, remaining behind them as reserves. the 1. heavy and 1. light artillery batteries reinforced the 7. Jäger regiment from Shlisselburg. On the right wing of the line the 2. light cavalry division was deployed, flanked from right by the 32. Don Cossack Regiment. The 7. and 8. infantry divisions of the III. corps were deployed on the left side of the 5. infantry division, up to the 3. cavalry division from the left wing. The divisions of the Russian army deployed their regiments in two lines. The 12. infantry division remained as reserve, along the road to Balmazújváros.

Even after the Russian army fully deployed and their artillery outnumbered (47 to 301), the Hungarian artillery dominated the Russian artillery, and repulsed the attacks of the 5. infantry division against the Bobich division. The Hungarian artillery caused important losses also among the Russian leading officers. A Hungarian grenade exploded in front of the horse of Lieutenant General Pavel Jakovlevich Kupriyanov, the commander of the II. corps, killing the animal and shattering (according to other sources ripping off) his leg. Kupriyanov thought that he would die shortly, and wanted to die lying on the banner of the nearby Russian battalion, but he survived, although this battle ended his military career. Paskevich sent Lieutenant General Ivan Mihayovich Labintsev to take his place, but he too was almost killed, when a Hungarian projectile exploded near him, killing his horse. Another important Russian officer, Major General Ivan Petrovich Miller, the commander of the 3. artillery division, was also wounded: a bullet entered his chest and shoulder.

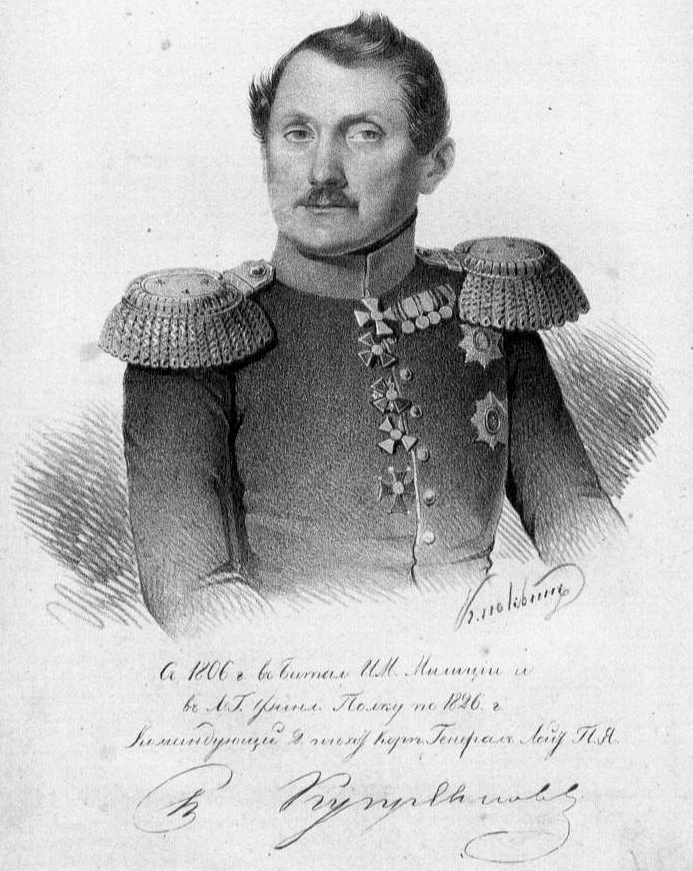
Kupreyanov Pavel Jakovlevitch

After the deployment of the 7. and 8. infantry divisions, artillery general Gillenschmidt deployed 4 heavy batteries behind the Russian left wing, which unleashed heavy fire on the Korponay division, which, as a result of this, started to retreat behind the brick pits. In order to carry out this action with success, the Bobich division from the center had to resist any attack on their positions. Taking notice of the retreat of the Hungarian right wing, Paskevich wanted to send his cavalry around the Nagyerdő forest, and to attack the Korponay division from the side and from behind. First, in order to be sure that his cavalry's encircling maneuver will not be put in danger, he sent a cavalry unit to check out if the forest was defended by important Hungarian forces, and after they informed him that the way around the forest is undefended, he gave the order to the 3. light cavalry division, the Transcaucasian Muslim cavalry regiment, and the Mountain cavalry companies to start their advance.

In this situation, General Nagysándor, instead of ordering a retreat, told Colonel Máriássy to start an attack with his division on the left flank. The latter thought that this was not a good idea, and that it would be better if the Hungarian army retreated. But Nagysándor could not be deterred from his decision. Máriássy finally obeyed the order, his battalions starting their advance in echelon formation, under the cover of the cavalry of the left wing, sent 1,200 paces ahead of the infantry. But after a few hundred meters the attack stalled because of the heavy cannonade of the Russian artillery.

In the meanwhile, the Russian army deployed for attack. The 3. Russian light cavalry division, flanked from the left by the Muslim cavalry regiment and two companies of the Caucasus Mountain Riders rode around the Nagyerdő forest, attacking Korponay's division from the back, totally surprising them. The 96. infantry battalion tried to defend themselves by forming a square formation, and repulsing the first attack of the 5. Lithuanian uhlan regiment, but they could not resist the second charge. Being hit also by four heavy batteries, the weakest unit of Nagysándor's army crumbled under the attack, fleeing in the forest and in the city. The retreating 96. battalion was covered by the 15. six-pounder battery, but their heroic fight could not counterbalance the overwhelming superiority of the Russian artillery, many of their cannons becoming unusable, and the left leg of the leader of the battery, Captain Márton Csányi, being shot off. After the Hungarian artillery withdrew from the right flank, the 7. Russian Infantry Division was able to reach the forefront of the brickworks unhindered, but the batteries hastily installed here by them could not cause much harm to the enemy, because the 3. light cavalry and the Muslim riders milled with the retreating Hungarian infantry and the mounted national guards sent the Hungarian commandment from the reserve.

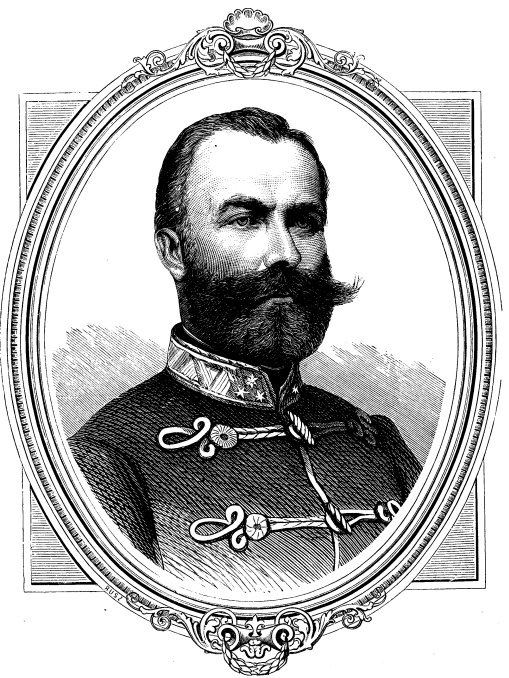
Máriássy János

As the Muslim cavalry chased the Korponay division, causing them heavy losses, the 3. light cavalry attacked the Hungarian center represented by the Bobich division from the flank and from the back, while the 7. and 8. infantry divisions charged against them from the front, causing them to rout after suffering heavy losses. In the generalizing chaos the Defense Battalion of Hont County defending the Kokasló was attacked by the charging Russian infantry and cavalry units, which defended themselves heroically for a while, but the impetuous assault of the Russian cavalry swept them away, killing, among many others, their leader, captain Pintér. Many of this battalions soldiers became prisoners, while the others joined the retreating troops. Seeing the developing panic, the 2 companies of the 89. battalion from the Nagyerdő forest retreated towards Nagyléta.

Nagysándor tried to save what he could by sending his last reserve, the 6 companies(2 companies from the reserve and 4 companies from the right wing) of the 1. "Imperial" Hussar Regiment, but when they saw the overwhelming numerical superiority of the attacking Russian troops, they confined themselves to save the cannons, abandoning the infantry to their fate. The retreating Bobich division retreated, through heavy fighting with the 7. Russian infantry division, from its positions at the brick pits to the suburbs of Debrecen. A Russian battery prepared to fire grapeshot against the square formed by the Bobich brigade but saw the Russian cavalry from the left wing, so they did not shoot in order to avoid hitting also their own comrades. So the 3. Russian light cavalry division and the Muslim cavalry units pursued the retreating Hungarians in the suburbs. Artillery Mikhail Dmitrievich Gorchakov sent 4 cannons near the brick pits to support his cavalry. The Muslim raiders pursuing the fleeing Hungarians, entered the town and captured 4 cannons without towing device of the Korponay division, 2 ammunition wagons, supply wagons, and many prisoners. The 96. Hungarian infantry battalion, which suffered heavy casualties, including its commander Major Arnold Balka, who was mortally wounded, retreated through the city towards Nagyléta. The Bobich division retreated from the town through heavy fighting into the vineyards, Colonel Bobich himself was wounded, his horse being killed.

Máriássy, the commander of the other infantry division, sensing the danger, prepared for the attack, so he suffered smaller losses while he retreated towards Derecske, but then he understood that if he retreats, the Bobich division could be cut off and destroyed by the Russians. So he covered the retreating Hungarian units with his division, many of the soldiers of the two destroyed divisions joining his retreating troops, repulsing with their volley the attack of the 4. Russian infantry division and the 32 Don Cossack cavalry regiment. The retreating 4. Russian infantry division was stopped and ordered in a chain formation. Fearing the renewed attack of the much stronger enemy, Máriássy took a long detour towards the south, in the direction of Hajdúszoboszló, in the opposite way as the other retreating Hungarian troops headed, trying to split the pursuing Russian troops, weakening their chasing efficiency. The Hungarians were lucky because the 2. Russian light cavalry division led by Lieutenant General Glazenap, sent to encircle the Hungarian left flank, got lost in the high cornfield, arriving on the battlefield only after the battle ended.

The Russian 7. and 8. infantry divisions occupied the whole Debrecen until 8:00 p.m., while the 4. and 5. infantry divisions from the center continued the artillery duel with the retreating, and still operational Hungarian units. These divisions received the order to advance at 6:00 p.m., reaching the town an hour later. The 12. infantry division and the 4. combined light cavalry division from the reserve did not participate in the battle.

=== Losses ===
During and as a consequence of the battle the Russians lost: 2 high officers and 58 soldiers were killed; 25 officers and 253 soldiers were wounded. they also lost 50 dead and wounded horses. The reports of the losses of the Hungarian I. corps are contradictory, but Attila Horváth concludes that it lost 1,401 dead, wounded or missing soldiers, excepting the Korponay division, which lost around 140-150 soldiers.

== Aftermath ==
The Hungarian losses were heavy, the Hungarians losing around 15% of their troops, but regarding the disproportionate sizes of the two armies (the Russian army was 5,5 times, and their artillery was 7 times bigger than the Hungarians, and their cavalry alone was numerically almost equal to the whole Hungarian army), Paskevich could not be content with the result. Regarding these proportions, it is a miracle that the Hungarian losses were only around 2000.

Besides the enemy's superiority, there were other causes of the Hungarian defeat too, like their poor reconnaissance, the chief of staff of the I. corps, after gathering the information he received, believed that the Russian troops are only 15,000 strong, while in reality, they were 4 times more numerous. The other cause was their disastrous deployment: instead of occupying the two sides of the road towards Nagyvárad, they should have deployed on the region South from it, they did not occupy the Nagyerdő forest and placed their center behind a very high cornfield, which prevented them to properly see the enemies movements. Besides this Nagysándor placed his weakest unit, the inexperienced and poorly equipped Korponay division on the right flank, where the enemy flanking maneuver could be most probably expected.

Later Görgei was accused of not intervening in the battle to save Nagysándor, wanting him to be defeated because of their personal conflicts. But the task of the I. corps was to defend from the side the army of Görgei, and if he would have marched from Vámospércs towards Debrecen to help Nagysándor, then he himself would have broken his own orders issued before. And if Nagysándor would have listened to his chief of staff and if he had stuck to the orders of Görgei about retreating towards Nagyvárad after repulsing the enemy, he would have not suffered this defeat. When Görgei heard at Vámospércs the sound of the cannons coming from Debrecen, he thought that Nagysándor was carrying out the order which he gave him. If Görgei would have decided, at 1:55 p.m. when he first heard the sound of the cannons, to march from Vámospércs to Debrecen, lying at 25 km distance, his troops would have arrived only 6-6,30 hours later there; around 8:30-9:00 p.m., much later then 4:30-5:00 p.m., when the battle ended. So in this case the result would have been the catastrophic defeat of Nagysándor's army, then Görgei's army exhausted from the long marching towards Debrecen.

During the battle of Debrecen, Görgei's army consisting of the III. and VII. corps, continued their march towards Arad, gaining several days distance from the Russian army, whose delay was augmented also by supply difficulties. This created an opportunity for the Army of the Northern Danube together with the main Hungarian army from Southern Hungary to unitedly defeat the main Austrian army of Haynau, before the Russians arrived.

During the battle, Paskevich believed that he was fighting with the whole Northern Danube Army led by Artúr Görgei. Only after the battle, he learned that he was again fooled by Görgei, who was not even near Debrecen, and he had no idea about his whereabouts.

Although the Russians were thinking about pursuing the retreating Hungarians, Paskevich decided not to proceed, because the food supplies of his army were low, and they had to be extracted from the city of Debrecen, which took them several days. The remnants of the Bobich division and the cavalry division retreated in two columns towards the south, covered by several hussar companies and some cannons. The cannons of the Hungarian right wing were saved by the "Imperial" hussars, who broke with them through the Cossacks lines, and retreated towards the eastern edge of Debrecen. This detachment joined the rest of the army in the evening at Derecske. The other units of the army fled through the city towards the south and southeast, then they too joined the army in the evening at Derecske. After a short resting in Derecske, this column of the Hungarian army continued their march towards Berettyóújfalu. The Máriássy division followed them in an hour. They reached Berettyóújfalu on 3 August, where they joined the rest of the army, then, Nagysándor, considering that the shallow water of the Berettyó river cannot provide enough defense against a renewed Russian attack, ordered his troops to continue their march towards Nagyvárad, followed only by a couple of companies of cossacks, which observed them from the distance. The I. corps marched through Biharkeresztes to Váradpüspöki, where after a longer resting, on 5 August they joined Görgei's main army. From here the reunited Northern Danube Army continued their way on 5 August to Gyapju, on 6 to Nagyszalonta, on 7 to Nagyzerénd, and on 8 to Simánd. They were in Arad on 9 August, when on the same day, the main Hungarian army led by Lieutenant General Henryk Dembiński suffered a decisive defeat of the Hungarian army in the Battle of Temesvár. After this there was nothing else for Görgei to do than surrendering to the enemy, and ending the Hungarian War of Independence.

== Sources ==
- Bánlaky, József (2001). A magyar nemzet hadtörténelme (The Military History of the Hungarian Nation) (in Hungarian). Budapest: Arcanum Adatbázis.
- Bóna, Gábor (1987). Tábornokok és törzstisztek a szabadságharcban 1848–49 ("Generals and Staff Officers in the War of Freedom 1848–1849") (in Hungarian). Budapest: Zrínyi Katonai Kiadó. p. 430. ISBN 963-326-343-3.
- Hermann, Róbert, ed. (1996). Az 1848–1849 évi forradalom és szabadságharc története ("The history of the Hungarian Revolution and War of Independence of 1848–1849) (in Hungarian). Budapest: Videopont. p. 464. ISBN 963-8218-20-7.
- Hermann, Róbert (1999), "Görgei Artúr a hadvezér (Artúr Görgei the Military Leader.)" (PDF), Hadtörténelmi Közlemények. 112. (1999) 1.
- Hermann, Róbert (2001). Az 1848–1849-es szabadságharc hadtörténete ("Military History of the Hungarian Revolution of 1848–1849") (in Hungarian). Budapest: Korona Kiadó. p. 424. ISBN 963-9376-21-3.
- Hermann, Róbert (2004). Az 1848–1849-es szabadságharc nagy csatái ("Great battles of the Hungarian War of Independence of 1848–1849") (in Hungarian). Budapest: Zrínyi. p. 408. ISBN 963-327-367-6.
- Horváth, Attila (2016), Az 1849. augusztus 2-i debreceni ütközet (The Battle of Debrecen from 2. December 1849) (PDF)
