= József Nagysándor =

Hungarian general

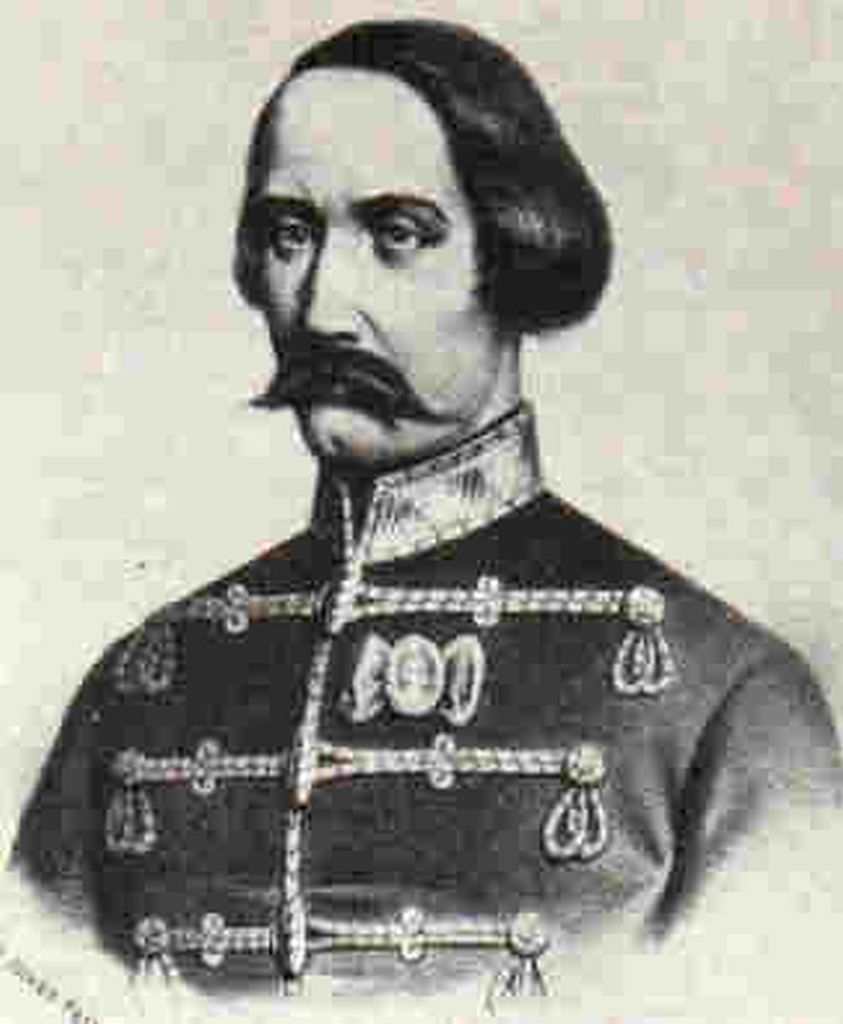
József Nagysándor

József Nagysándor (17 October 1803, Nagyvárad (present-day Oradea, Romania) - 6 October 1849, Arad) was a honvéd general in the Hungarian Army. He was executed for his part in the Hungarian Revolution of 1848, and is considered one of the 13 Martyrs of Arad.

== Family ==
According to the records kept in the Nagyvárad-olaszi Roman Catholic Parish Church he was born on 19 August 1803 as János József Sándor in Nagyvárad (present-day Oradea) to the parents of József Sándor and Jozefa Tatzel. He had eight siblings. The family changed its name to Nagy-Sándor sometime between 1809 and 1816, the exact reason is unknown.

== Life ==
He was educated at the Royal Catholic Academic Main Grammar School (now Catholic Academic Grammar School of Budapest). He began his military service in the Imperial Army in 1823, serving in the 5th and the 2nd hussar regiments. In 1844 he retired from military service. In 1848 he again entered to service; he was appointed as a major of the cavalry militia of Pest County. From October to December he successfully prevented the Austrian garrisons at Arad and Temesvár (present-day Timișoara) from making any contact. In January 1849 together with Ernő Kiss he took part in the offensive of Pancsova (present-day Pančevo). Due to his excellent performance in the first battles in the south he was promoted first to lieutenant-colonel and after to colonel. Together with János Damjanich he urged for the resignation of Ernő Kiss. When János Damjanich took the leadership of the Banat Corps he was appointed to the general of the cavalry brigade.

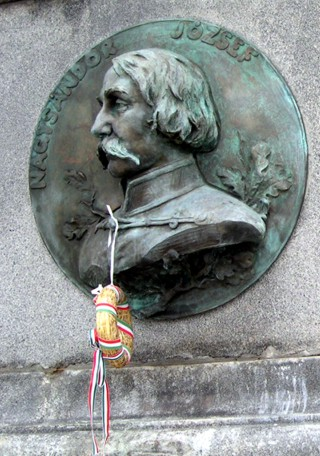
Relief on the base of the Liberty Statue in Arad

He was awarded second class order of merit for his valor by the involvement in the Second Battle of Szolnok on 5 March 1849 in which he persecuted the remainder of the enemy forces.

Along with the third corps of Damjanich between the Danube and Tisza he took part in the Battle of Tápióbicske, Battle of Isaszeg and First Battle of Vác, then, on 5 April he was promoted to general. He took part also in the Battle of Nagysalló and on 26 April in the First Battle of Komárom. He fought in Artúr Görgei's camp in the Siege of Buda. Despite being a quite good brigade and division commander, when he was named the commander of the I. corps in the Hungarian army, this task was beyond his capabilities. In the Battle of Pered, Third Battle of Komárom and the Second Battle of Vác, he became uncertain, and unsure about what to do in critical situations, which caused problems for the Hungarian army.

On 2 August 1849, after the crossing of Tokaj he clashed with the Russian Tsarist army – outnumbering the Hungarians nearly six to one – near Debrecen and sustained a defeat. He joined Görgei in Nagyvárad, he was preparing to clash with the army of general Schlik but the order of Görgei prevented this action. When he wanted to join with his officers to the battalions of Bem in Lugos (present-day Lugoj), after the proclamation of Görgei's military dictatorship he followed him and laid down the arms in Világos.

== Death ==
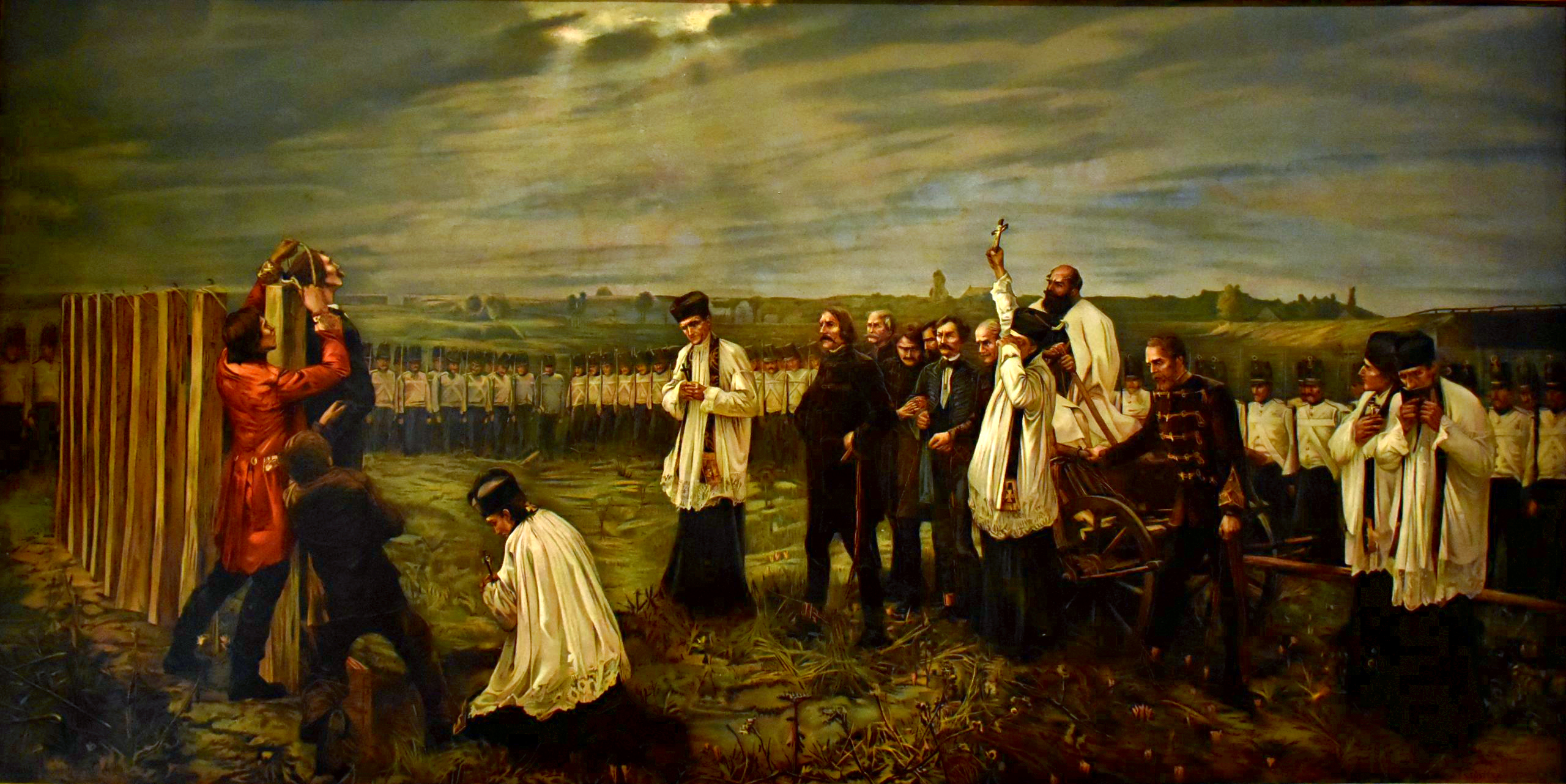
Execution of the Martyrs of Arad. Work by János Thorma.

He was among the officers who did not support Görgei, thus repeatedly drawing the attention of Lajos Kossuth to keep an eye on him. In the military council he stated: "If someone would want to be a dictator, I would become his Brutus."

In Arad he was sentenced to death by hanging, he was executed as the 9th (the 5th among those who were also executed by hanging).
