= Sucháň =

Sucháň Szuhány
- Municipality
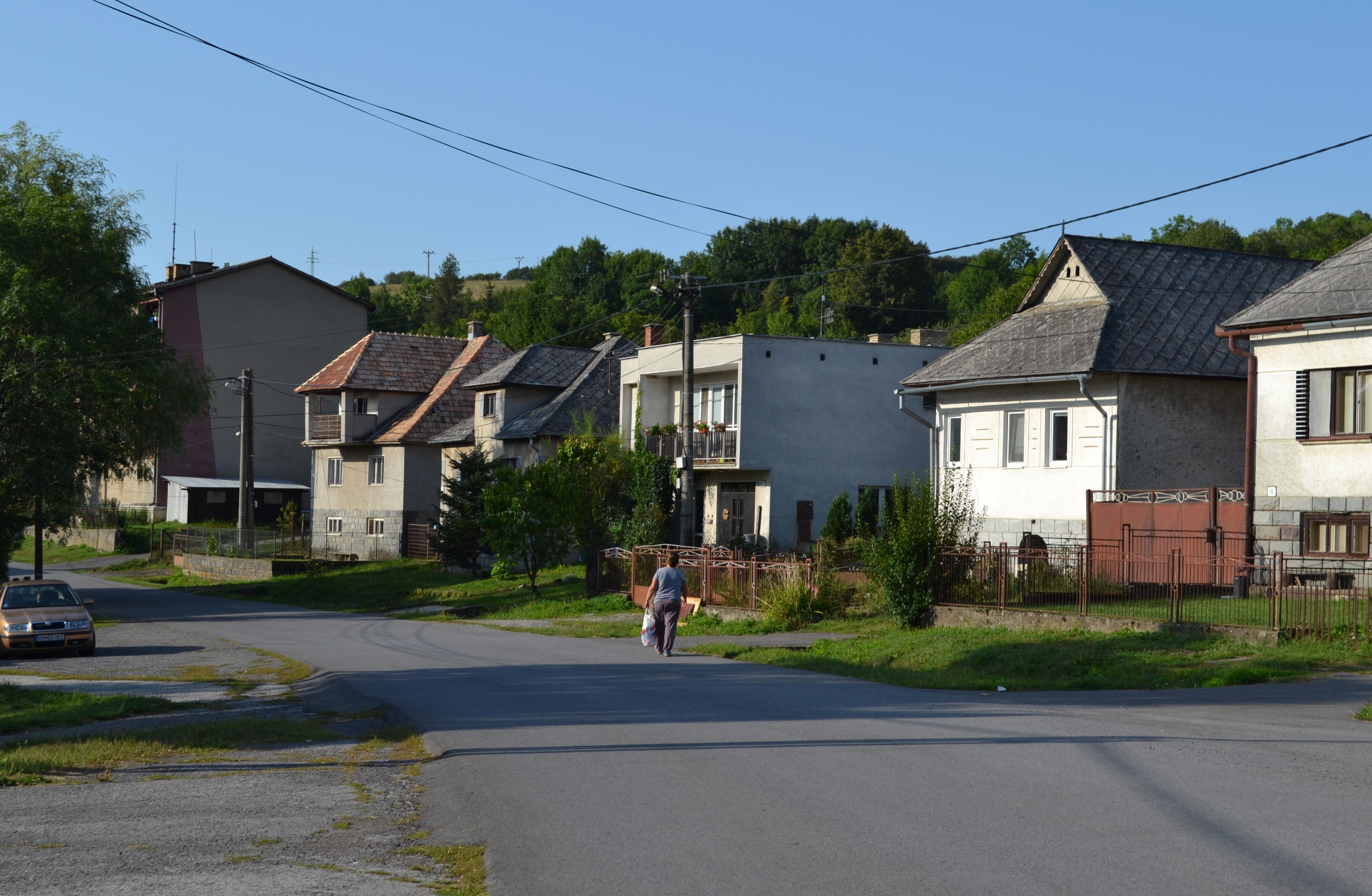

- Flag

- Location of Sucháň in the Banská Bystrica Region Location of Sucháň in Slovakia
- Coordinates: 48.32°N 19.23°E
- Country: Slovakia
- Region: Banská Bystrica Region
- District: Veľký Krtíš District
- First mentioned: 1349

Area
  - Total: 16.32 km^{2} (6.30 sq mi)
- Elevation: 493 m (1,617 ft)

Population (2025)
  - Total: 264
- Time zone: UTC+1 (CET)
  - Summer (DST): UTC+2 (CEST)
- Postal code: 991 35
- Area code: +421 47
- Vehicle registration plate (until 2022): VK
- Website: www.obecsuchan.sk

Sucháň (Hungarian: Szuhány) is a village and municipality in the Veľký Krtíš District of the Banská Bystrica Region of southern Slovakia.

== Geography ==
The municipality lies at an altitude of 493 metres (1,617 ft) and covers an area of 16.32 km^{2} (6.30 sq mi) (2025).

== Population ==
Population statistic (10 years)
Year	1995	2005	2015	2025
Count	300	278	269	264
Difference		−7.33%	−3.23%	−1.85%

Population statistic
Year	2024	2025
Count	259	264
Difference		+1.93%

It has a population of 264 people (31 December 2025).

=== Ethnicity ===
Census 2021 (1+%)
Ethnicity	Number	Fraction
Slovak	259	98.1%
Not found out	7	2.65%
Romani	4	1.51%
Total	264	

In year 2021 was 264 people by ethnicity 259 as Slovak, 7 as Not found out, 4 as Romani and 1 as Other.

Note on population: The difference values of population numbers in the table "Population statistic" and in the sections "Ethnicity" & "Religion" is caused by the use of various statistical methods.

=== Religion ===
Census 2021 (1+%)
Religion	Number	Fraction
Evangelical Church	122	46.21%
Roman Catholic Church	85	32.2%
None	37	14.02%
Christian Congregations in Slovakia	13	4.92%
Not found out	3	1.14%
Total	264	

In year 2021 was 264 people by religion 122 from Evangelical Church, 85 from Roman Catholic Church, 37 from None, 13 from Christian Congregations in Slovakia, 3 from Not found out, 1 from Old Catholic Church, 1 from Other, 1 from United Methodist Church and 1 from Ad hoc movements.
