= Battle of Tura =

Coordinates: 47°36′00.5″N 19°35′50.6″E

- Part of the Hungarian Revolution of 1848
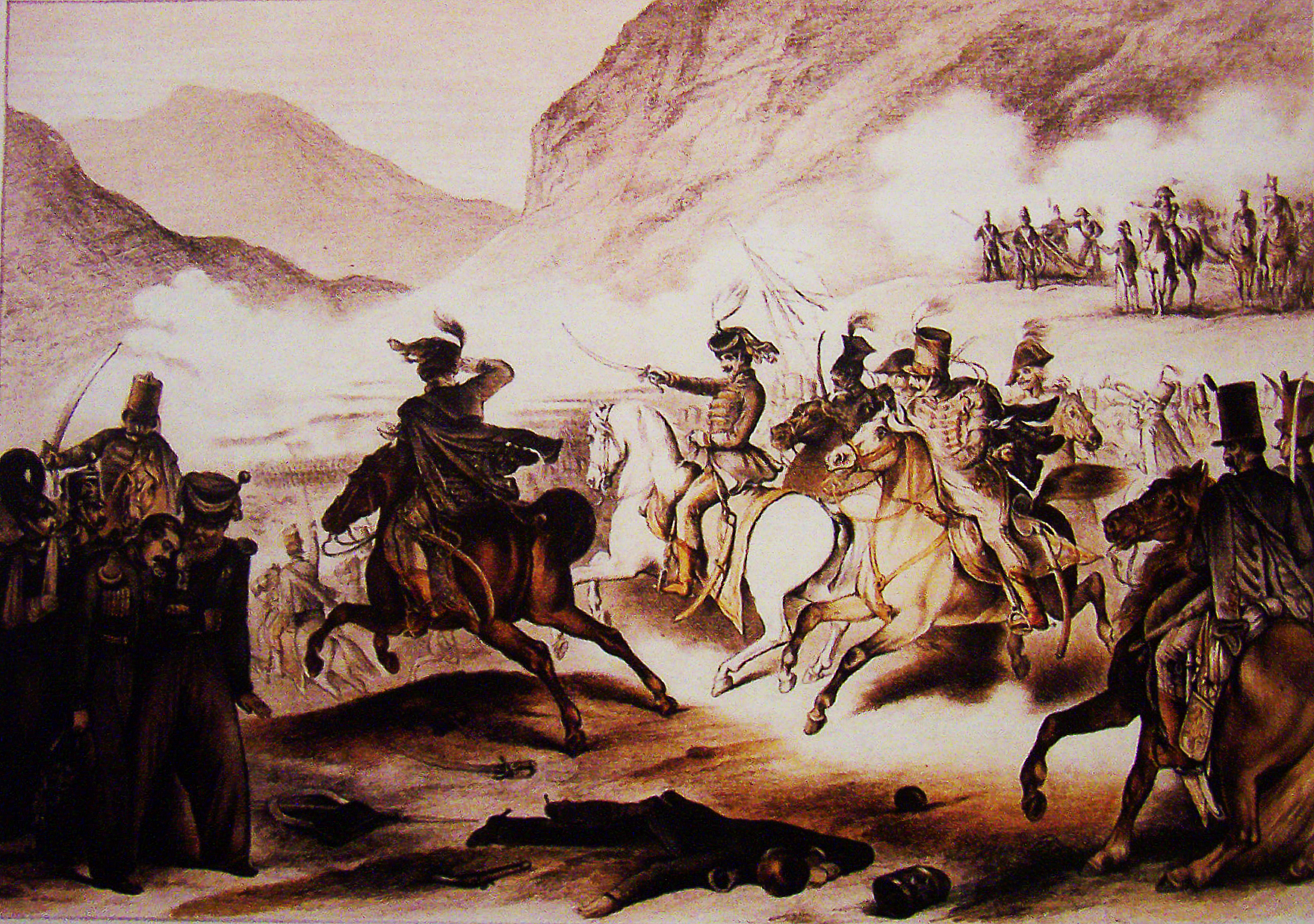
Date	20 July 1849
Location	around and in Tura Kingdom of Hungary
Result	Russian victory. See aftermath

Belligerents
Hungarian Revolutionary Army; Polish Legion	Russian Empire

Commanders and leaders
Mór Perczel; Arisztid Dessewffy; Lázár Mészáros; Henryk Dembiński	Aleksandr Petrovich Tolstoy; Ivan Mikhaylovich Labintsov; Ivan Paskevich

Strength
Total: 2,492 men 14 cannons	Total: 7,087 men: Tolstoy's cavalry column: 2,316 men, 16 cannons: 1. brigade of Labintsov's 5. infantry division: 4,771 men 18 cannons

Casualties and losses
Total: 80–100 dead 2 cannons	Total: 59 men

The Battle of Tura was fought around the village of Tura by the cavalry of the IX. and the X. corps of the Hungarian revolutionary army led by General Mór Perczel and the Russian cavalry detachment led by Lieutenant General Aleksandr Petrovich Tolstoy and the 1. brigade of the 5. infantry division led by Lieutenant General Ivan Mikhaylovich Labintsov. The Hungarians advanced towards the north in order to relieve the Russian pressure over General Artúr Görgei's Army of the Upper Danube, which after the second battle of Vác from 15 to 17 July was heading towards the Hungarian armies meeting point around Szeged. The battle started between the Hungarian cavalry units under Perczel and the Russian cavalry under Tolstoy. The Hungarians pushed back the Russian cavalry, but when the Russian infantry led by Labintsov arrived, Perczel retreated. The Russians did not pursued his troops. Although the Russians remained the masters of the battlefield, Perczel's objective to ease the Russian pressure over Görgei's troops succeeded, helping in this way the latter to succeed in his march to southern Hungary.

== Background ==
After the relieving of General Artúr Görgei from the high commandment of the Hungarian army, his place was taken by Lieutenant General Lázár Mészáros. Although as the former ministry of war he was an excellent organizer, who created from nothing the Hungarian army which, starting with 11 September 1848, successfully withstood against the attack of the Habsburg empire, then entering in a counter offensive, managed to liberate most of the country, he himself recognized the fact that as army commander was not good. Mészáros tried to concentrate enough troops around Szeged, but knowing that Görgei's Army of the Upper Danube will not arrive there soon, accepted General Józef Wysocki's plan to send the former Army of Northern Hungary (the IX. corps and the Polish Legion) together with the Reserve Corps, organized by General Mór Perczel to the Transtisza region to fight with the Russian army. The Governor-President of Hungary Lajos Kossuth, who did not trusted either in Mészáros's, nor in Lieutenant General Henryk Dembiński's military skills, chose as commander of this army Perczel, who, indeed had some great military victories in his past. These troops, named the Army of the Tisza had 26,500 soldiers and 49 guns. Kossuth put under Perczel's disposal also the 2,500 men and 7 cannons strong brigade, led by Károly Knezić which defended the Tisza's line, and the 7,100 men and 30 cannons strong division led by Colonel Lajos Kazinczy. Perczel argued with Dembiński, Mészáros's Chief of staff about the direction on which the Army of the Tisza should operate. Perczel's superior, Dembiński, who in his whole career was a defensive-type general, and maybe he was already thinking about leaving Hungary in the Ottoman Empire, wanted to march towards southern Hungary, although after the Hungarian victory at Kishegyes over the army of Josip Jelačić, there was no need for that any more, while Perczel, a general who loved the attack, wanted to attack the Russians. The argument was interrupted by the news that on 15 July Görgei fought with the Russians at Vác, and they agreed to send the cavalry division of the army to do a reconnaissance and a demonstration in the direction of Nagykáta. This was carried out with success, while the division of Colonel Károly Lenkey advanced to Újszász. On 18 July evening Mészáros ordered a reconnaissance towards Jászfényszaru. On 19 July arrived to the Hungarian general headquarters from Nagykáta General Gusztáv Pikéthy, and he told to Mészáros and Perczel that on 15–17 July Görgei fought with the Russians at Vác, and because he could not break through them, he headed towards Balassagyarmat.

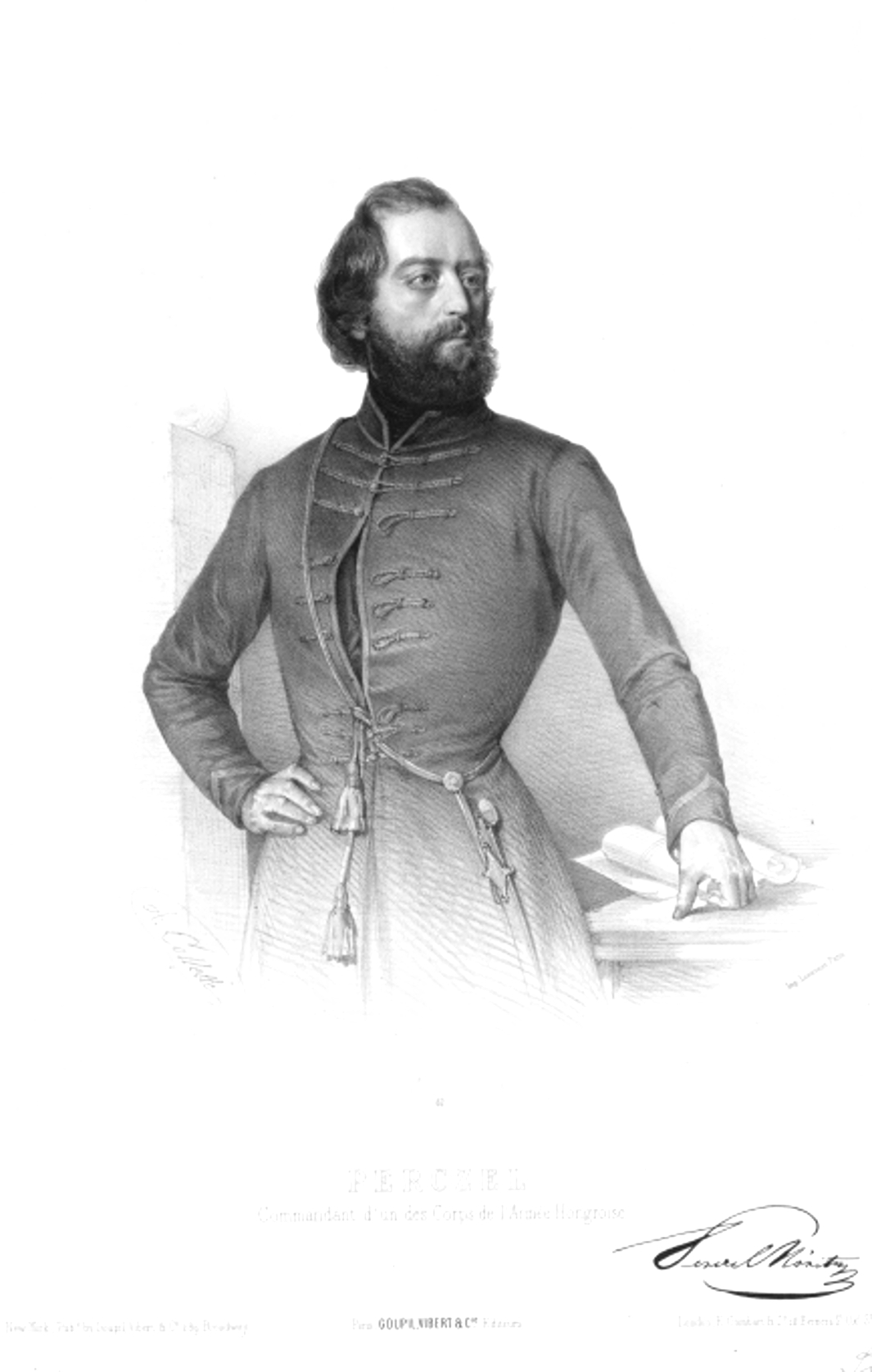
Perczel Mór 1848

In the war council held after this, Perczel proposed to attack with all their army through Jászberény towards Kápolna, while Dembiński and Mészáros decided that Károly Lenkey's division will cross the Tisza at Szolnok, followed by the rest of the infantry. The army had to advance to Tiszafüred, hoping that with this they will ease the junction with them of Görgei's army, and also the Kazinczy division which was isolated in northeastern Hungary. Mészáros hoped that in case of a success the army resulted of the junction of Görgei's troops will have around 65,000 soldiers, and with them they could defeat Haynau's forces at Szeged. He wrote to Kossuth that they need 10 days for completing with success this mission, so the Hungarian forces from Szeged must defend themselves, relying only on Antal Vetter's troops and the forces of the Militia units in a case of an enemy attack

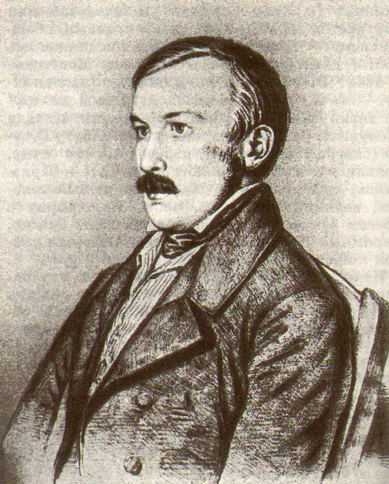
Lieutenant General Alexander Petrovich Tolstoy

This plan was audacious, but it still was more reasonable than Perczel's, because if they followed his plan, the Russian army could easily surprise them, attacking them from flank, which could have caused a disaster to the Hungarians. But the plan faced a problem which was impossible to overcome: neither Görgei's army nor Kazinczy's division was too close to be able to meet with the Army of the Tisza at Tiszafüred around 25–26 July, as it was designated. Görgei's Army of the Upper Danube on 20 July was still at Rimaszombat, arriving around Miskolc on 22–23, while Kazinczy's division was at Huszt and he only promised that on 19 July he would be at Munkács. There it still was a hope of the meeting of the three armies at Tiszafüred, but only in the case if none of them was halted, or their routs were not cut by enemy troops. If only one of them suffered a delay, the plan was doomed, being also very risky for these troops to be attacked by the enemy, because they were not fully trained and many of the units had deficiences regarding their weapons and equipment. In order to cover and to mislead the enemy, the cavalry division led by Major General Arisztid Dessewffy was ordered to advance to Jászfényszaru and also to gather information about the Russians. This Hungarian military unit was the only one which entered in battle with the Russians.

On 16 July Marshal Ivan Paskevich received informations about Perczel's corps advancement in the around Szolnok, on the back of the Russian troops, while on the other day he heard that the Hungarian units appeared around Gyöngyös and Hatvan. After the battle of Vác from 15 to 17 July Paskevich wanted to march towards Hatvan, sending the Wagon train of his troops towards Aszód, and for this he created a detachment led by Lieutenant General Alexander Petrovich Tolstoy, to cover the waon train and to gather information about Perczel's troops. On 18 July he sent also an infantry brigade after Tolstoy.

Tolstoy with his troops arrived to Aszód on 18 July, and on 20 the Muslim cavalry regiment under his commande, the infantry brigade and a Sapper platoon marched to Hatvan. The other units under Tolstoy's command (13 Hussar companies, two Cossack companies and 14 cannons) headed from Aszód to Zsámbok to cover the main troops from the right.

== Prelude ==
On 20 July mourning Tolstoy was informed by the commander of the Uhlan battalion stationed around Jászfényszaru and Zsámbok that important Hungarian forces are advancing from Szolnok, and their 4,000-5,000 strong vanguard already occupied Tóalmás. Tolstoy at 5 a.m. departed from Aszód, sending ahead the two Cossack companies. Arriving to Tura, he received the uhlans report that they retreated before the superior enemy.

The Hungarian troops advanced in two columns. Major General Dessewffy with two cavalry brigades advanced on the Nagykáta-Szentmártonkáta-Tóalmás-Jászfényszaru route, while the brigade of General Perczel marched through Nagykáta-Jászfelsőszentgyörgy-Szentlőrinckáta-Jászfényszaru. Parallel with them three infantry brigades under General Wysocki marched to Tápiószele. Lieutenant General Lázár Mészáros and Lieutenant General Henryk Dembiński joined the column led by Dessewffy. The order was that the Hungarians should not advance to northwest from Jászfényszaru, but to retreat to Jászberény, marching towards the east and then the south.

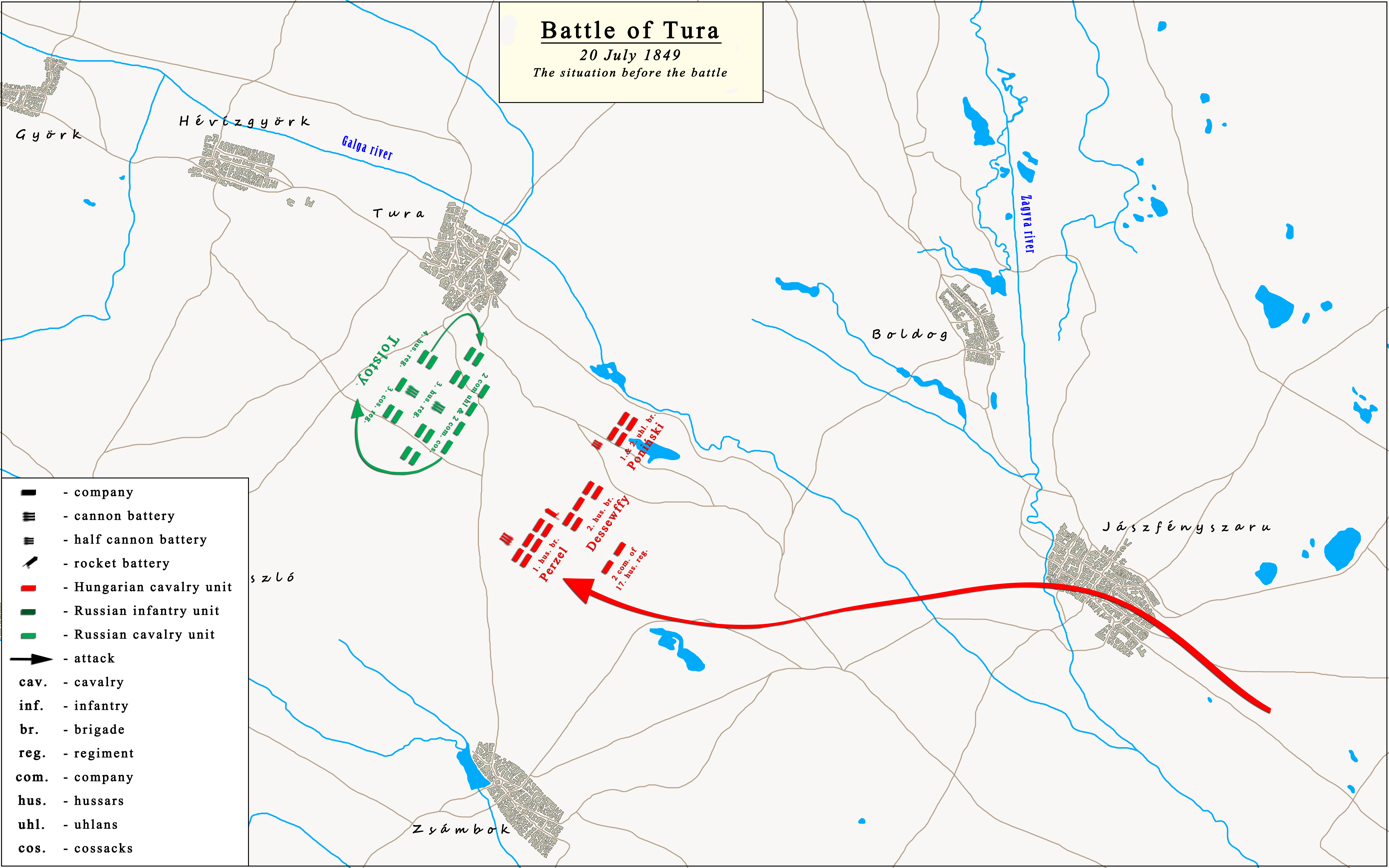
The battle of Tura (1849). The start of the battle

During their advance, the Károlyi hussars under Dessewffy captured three uhlans in Tóalmás. Arriving in Jászfényszaru, they did not found any enemies there, but spotted two companies of enemy cavalry towards Tura. So Dessewffy decided to advance progressively with his two brigades, in order to push the enemy back, or to force them to take battle formation. Soon the most advanced cossack patrols discovered the approaching enemy, in front of whom the division of Kharkov Lancers retreated.

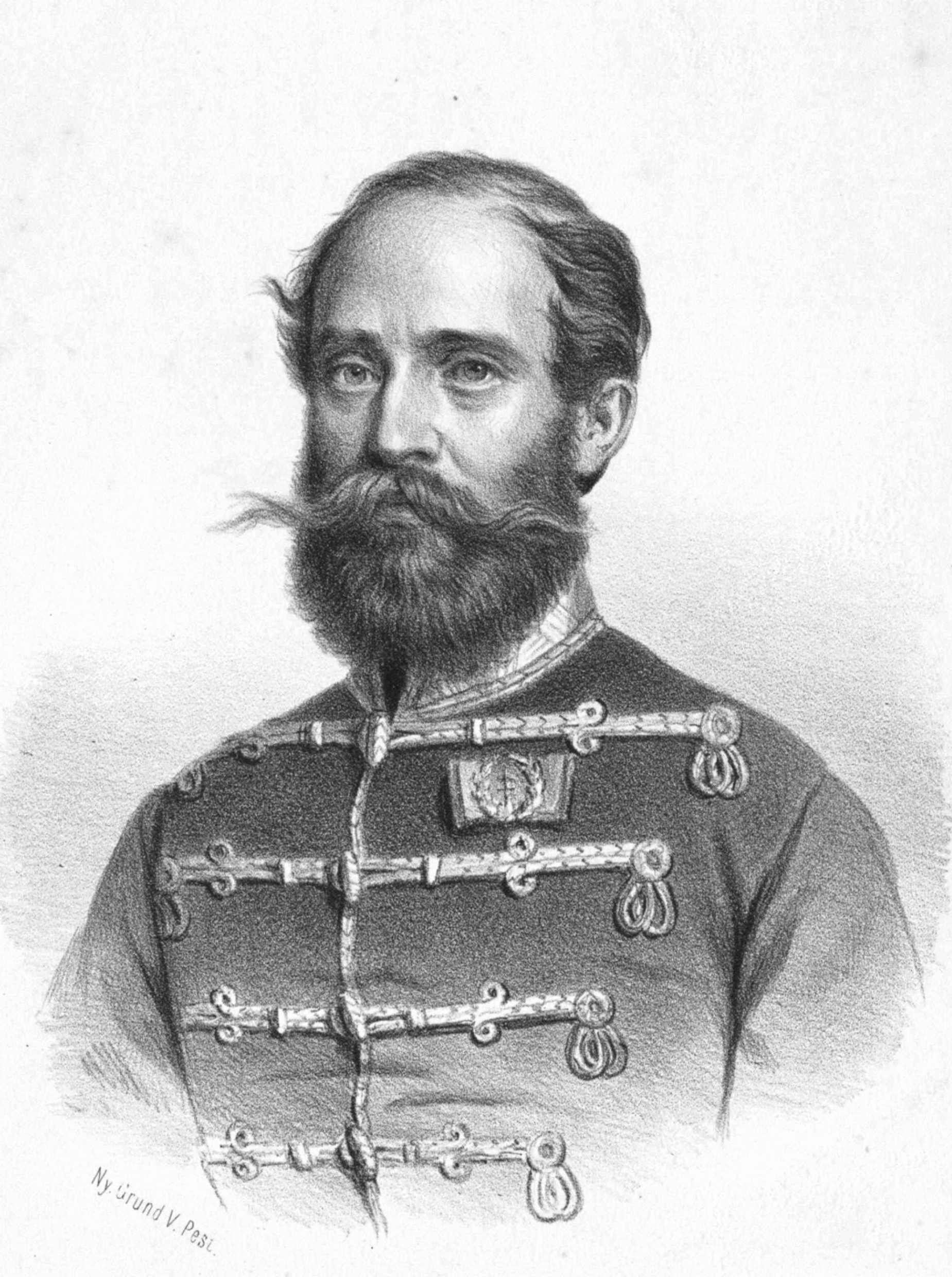
Dessewffy Arisztid

Being informed about the Hungarians approach, Lieutenant General Tolstoy deployed his troops behind Tura. Their first line was formed by eight companies of Yelizavetgrad Hussar regiment (called also Her Imperial Highness Grand Duchess Olga Nikolaevna's Hussar Regiment) and the eight cannons of the 2. Don reserve battery, in the second line were the five companies of the Lubny Hussar regiment (called also His Majesty the King of Hannover's Hussar Regiment) and 12 cannons of the 4. light battery. In front of the two lines Tolstoy positioned the two companies of Cossacks and the two Harkov uhlan companies which retreated earlier from Jászfényszaru, in order to slow down the Hungarians advance, and to mask the battery from the first hussar line. At the same time Tolstoy was informed by Lieutenant General Labintsov that he is on his way towards Tura with the 1. brigade of the 5. infantry division.

Around 11 a.m. the Russian troops approached to within a cannon shot of the Hungarians and halted. Tolstoy did not want to begin the attack before the arrival of Labintsov's infantry. But Labintsov at this time was only around Aszód. Noticing the presence of Tolstoy's troops, Dessewffy, Mészáros and Dembiński, instead of attacking, also decided to wait for Perczel's brigade to arrive, and only then to start the battle. Arriving to Jászfényszaru, Perczel learned from the three captive Russian uhlans that in Tura, Bag and Hévízgyörk there are stationed 8000–10,000 Russian troops and 32 guns. Then he received also Dessewffy's report that they chased the Russian units from Jászfényszaru to Tura, where they found important Russian troops, and now they are waiting for him to come to help them. Perczel replied to them reprovingly that this was not according to their initial plan, but he is on his way to join them in the battle. During his march towards Tura his troops had to cross the Zagyva river on three bridges, and his troops had to pull manually the cannons over one of them. Passing the command to his chief of staff, lieutenant colonel Szodtfriedt, Perczel rushed to the future battlefield, to Tura. At 1 p.m. Perczel's brigade arrived on the battlefield

On the right flank, the Hungarians positioned the four Polish uhlan companies under Major Władysław Poniński and Dembiński, supported by a half three-pounder battery. On the center were the five companies of Hussars under Dessewffy and Mészáros, supported by a Congreve rocket battery. The left flank was made by six companies of Hussars under General Perczel, the reserve is represented by two companies of the Attila Hussars. Both the Hungarian wings were relying on cornfields.

At the beginning of the battle, the balance of forces was equal, excepting the fact that none of the Hungarian cavalries units had more than a half of year's experience, and only the Polish uhlans participated previously in an important battle at Szolnok on 5 March.

In the battle the Hungarians participated with 17 cavalry companies, 2,291 saddled and 208 traction horses, and 14 cannons. In total, they brought in the battle 2492 soldiers.

The Russians participated at the beginning of the battle with the cavalry column of Alexandr Petrovich Tolstoy, consisting of 17 cavalry companies, 2076 saddled and 436 traction horses, and 16 cannons. In total, they brought in the battle 2,316 soldiers. Towards the end of the battle the 1. brigade of the 5. Infantry Division led by Ivan Michaylovich Labintsov, which had 28 infantry companies, 18 cannons, and 4,771 soldiers. In total the Russians participated with 28 infantry companies, 17 cavalry companies, 2,078 saddled, and more than 436 traction horses, as well as 34 cannons. In total, they had 7087 soldiers.

== Battle ==
When Perczel's brigade arrived, finishing the deployment of the Hungarian troops for the battle around 1 p.m., and, following the order of Dembiński, their three cannons started to shoot the Russian lines, then the Hungarian centers guns too started to shoot, while the right wing advanced. Tolstoy responded by bringing in the first line and to its left the Hussar regiment from the second line, pulling back in the second line the two uhlan and the two Cossack companies, and he also brought in the first line, in the center, the artillery from the second line, and with these 14 guns, he responded vehemently to the Hungarian fire. With this overwhelming fire the Russian artillery made two Hungarian cannons unusable, killing also the commander of the Polish half battery, thanks to this forcing the uhlans of Poniński to retreat. Now the Russian artillery started to shoot at the Hungarian center, causing Desswffy's hussars to retreat towards left. Now on the left wing, Perczel's four cannons started to shoot for an hour, then the Hungarian cavalry started to advance. Poniński's uhlans were face to face with four of the five Russian Lubny hussars (one of them remaining further back under the coverage of their cannons), but they did not attack, they only tried to prevent the two Russian hussar groups to join with each other. In the meanwhile the Hungarian center united with the left under Perczel's leadership, who had now 11 hussar companies (around 1700 riders) at his disposal. Taking advantage of the rolling terrain that to some extent concealed the Hungarians, he gave order to a company of the 9. Hussar regiment and to another one of the 12. Hussar regiment to attack the Russians, trying to outflank their right wing, holding four companies of the 17. Hussar regiment in reserve. On his side Dessewffy led in person the attack of five companies of the 5. and 16. Hussar regiments. The seven Hussar companies entered in hand-to-hand combat with the Yelizavetgrad (Olga) Hussar regiment, causing them severe losses, 8 Russian officers being wounded, one of them Major Golsteyn dying after two hours by the 13 wounds he suffered in the battle.

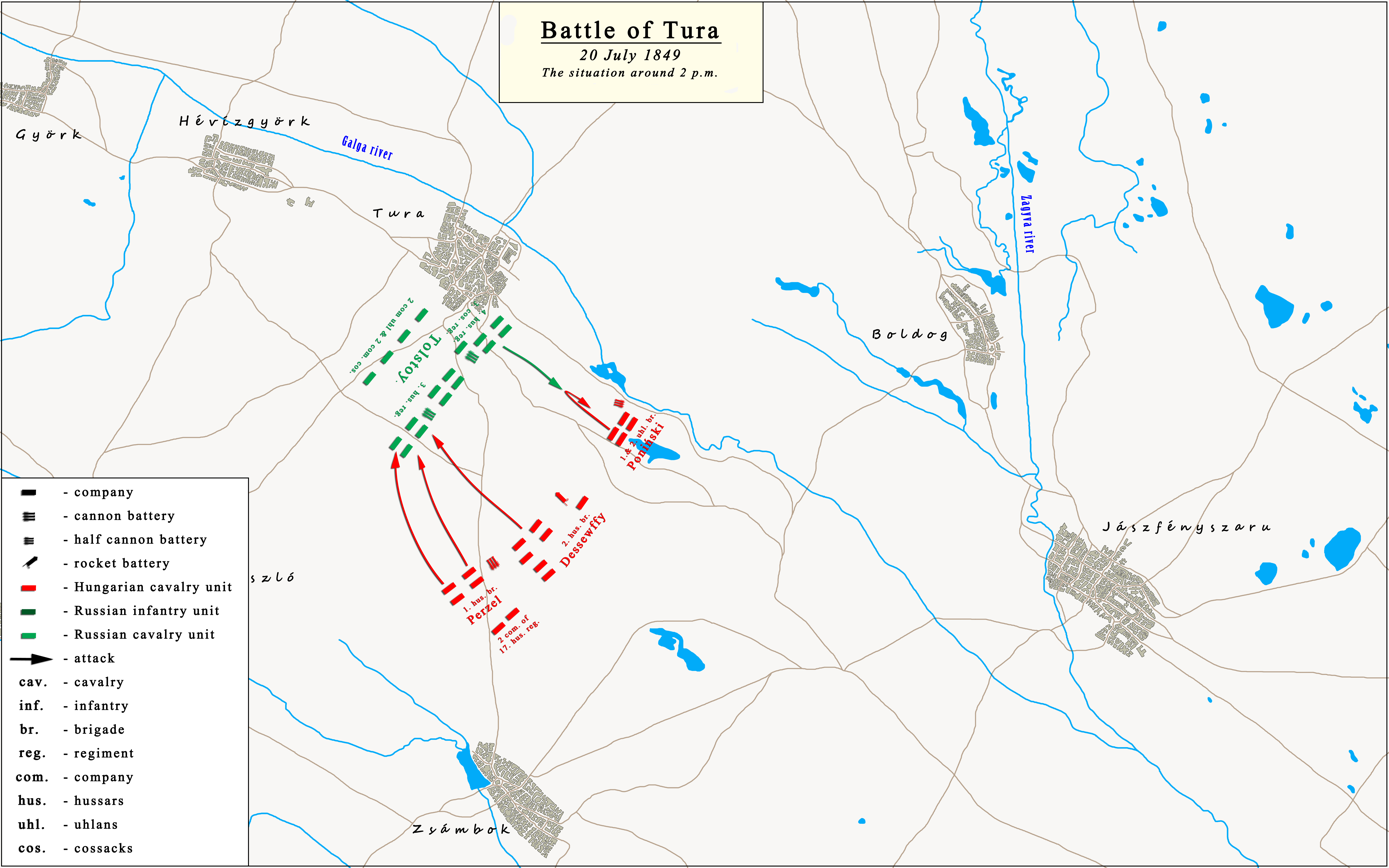
The battle of Tura (1849). The situation around 2 p.m

In order to hold back the Hungarians, Lieutenant General Tolstoy had to send in the battle the two companies of Cossacks and the other two companies of uhlans from the reserve, which stabilized the situation, but the Hungarians left wing too received reinforcements from Dessewffy, who came personally with the four hussar companies of the 17. regiment in battle, which forced Baggahufud to start to retreat. Later the Russian soldiers spoke with a mixture of fear and admiration about the "bearded Hungarian bishop clothed in red, with a cross on his chest", who with the sword in his hand caused so many devastation in their ranks. They learned only after the Hungarian surrender from 13 August, that "the angel of Death" was not a bishop but Aristid Dessewffy, clothed in his general uniform, wearing on his chest the double cross of the Hungarian Military Order of Merit. As result of the Hungarian attack, the regiment of the Olga hussars from the Russian right, led by General Baggahufud was pushed back.

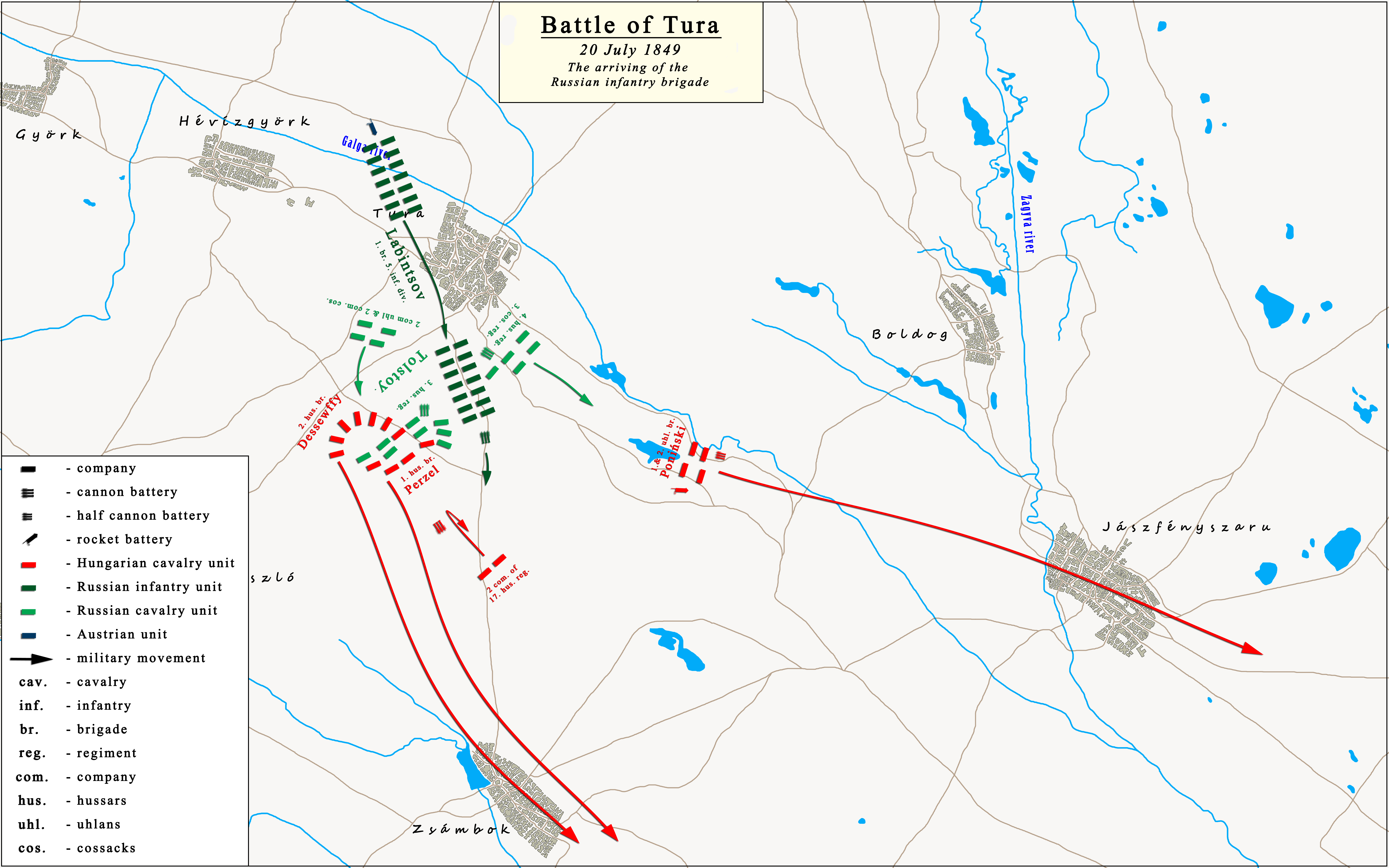
The battle of Tura (1849). The Russian infantry brigade of Lt. General Labintsov arrive on the battle field, and the end of the battle

A Battle Between Russian and Hungarian Hussars, 8(20) July 1849. According to the Russian historian Alexandr Voronov, the Yelizavetgrad (Olga) Hussars did not retreat, but withstood the assault, then after the two Cossack and two Uhlan companies from the reserve, led personally by Tolstoy, came to help, they counterattacked, chasing away the Hungarians (as it was shown above, the Hungarian historians Róbert Hermann and József Bánlaky write that the Russian reserve came before the involvement of the four Hussar companies, causing the Russian right flank to withdraw).

At this decisive moment arrived on the battlefield the infantry brigade of Lieutenant General Labintsov with 7 battalions, a heavy artillery battery and an Austrian Congreve rocket battery. Labintsov deployed the 1. brigade of the 5th division, placing his batteries on Tolstoy's left wing, and the Great Duke Vladimir regiment behind them, while the Vologda infantry regiment with the Austrian Congreve battery supported the retreating Russian right wing. The eight cannons of the heavy artillery battery pushed itself in a place left open in the Hungarian center, and unleashed fire against the Bocskai Hussars kept in reserve by Perczel. Perczel sent these Hussars in attack against the battery, but because they were rookies, could not change direction in time, so their attack was unsuccessful. Although Dessewffy and the brigade attacking on the left wing managed to break the enemy cavalries line, the apparition of the Russian infantry brigade could threaten with cutting their retreat rout. Understanding this danger, the attacking Hungarian cavalry rode around the back of the enemy, then headed towards Zsámbok, joining with the Bocskai hussars, positioned sideways at the forest of Zsámbok, who too retreated from the battlefield. Their retreat was covered also by the infantry brigade which crossed the Zagyva river. The four companies of the pro-Hungarian Polish uhlans together with the Attila Hussars from the reserve, retreated towards Jászfényszaru, where they took a sideways position. According to Lieutenant General Lázár Mészáros, they gathered all dead and wounded people and also the cannons, with the carriages provided by the villagers from Jászfényszaru.

The Russian cavalry tried to pursue the retreating Hungarians until Nagykáta, but without much success. At the end of the battle Field Marshal Paskevich too arrived to the battlefield with the 4. infantry division and the uhlan brigade of the 2. light cavalry division, but it was too late to make an effective chase of the Hungarians.

== Aftermath ==
The two Hungarian columns united at 7.00 p.m. at Tóalmás, then, after a short resting, they continued their way back to Nagykáta. On 21 July at 7 a.m. the cavalry division arrived to Tápiószele, while the infantry stationing there retreated to Abony. The Russians did not pursued the Hungarians, because Paskevich tried to use all his force to encircle Görgei's forces. The Hungarian action still managed to slow the Russian movements, helping Görgei to avoid the Russian encirclement.

After the battle Perczel wanted to remain around Abony to keep an eye both on the crossing point of the Tisza river and the Austrian troops from Pest. On the other hand, Mészáros and Dembiński wanted to retreat towards Szolnok, crossing the Tisza there, then to join the Hungarian forces from Szeged, by marching on the left bank of the river. Because of this disagreement a quarrel broke out between the two sides, at the end of this Perczel refused to obey to his two superiors, to which Mészáros and Dembiński left the army, heading towards Szeged. Later Perczel too marched towards Szeged through the Danube–Tisza Interfluve. The post-battle quarrel between General Perczel and the two Lieutenant Generals prevented the IX and X Hungarian corps to elaborate an effective military activity against the enemy armies approaching towards Szeged.

== Sources ==
- Bánlaky, József (2001). A magyar nemzet hadtörténelme ("The Military History of the Hungarian Nation) (in Hungarian). Budapest: Arcanum Adatbázis.
- Bóna, Gábor (1987). Tábornokok és törzstisztek a szabadságharcban 1848–49 ("Generals and Staff Officers in the War of Freedom 1848–1849") (in Hungarian). Budapest: Zrínyi Katonai Kiadó. p. 430. ISBN 963-326-343-3.
- Hermann, Róbert (2001), 1848-1849 a szabadságharc hadtörténete ("Military History of 1848-1849") (in Hungarian), Budapest: Korona, ISBN 963-9376-21-3
- Hermann, Róbert (2004). Az 1848–1849-es szabadságharc nagy csatái ("Great battles of the Hungarian Revolution of 1848-1849") (in Hungarian). Budapest: Zrínyi. p. 408. ISBN 963-327-367-6.
- Voronov, Aleksandr (2001), "The Olga Hussars. A Battle Between Russian and Hungarian Hussars, 8(20) July 1849. (Translated by Mark Conrad)", Цейхгауз. 13, 1/2001. pp. 22-28
