= Akhaltsikhe =

Akhaltsikhe ახალციხე
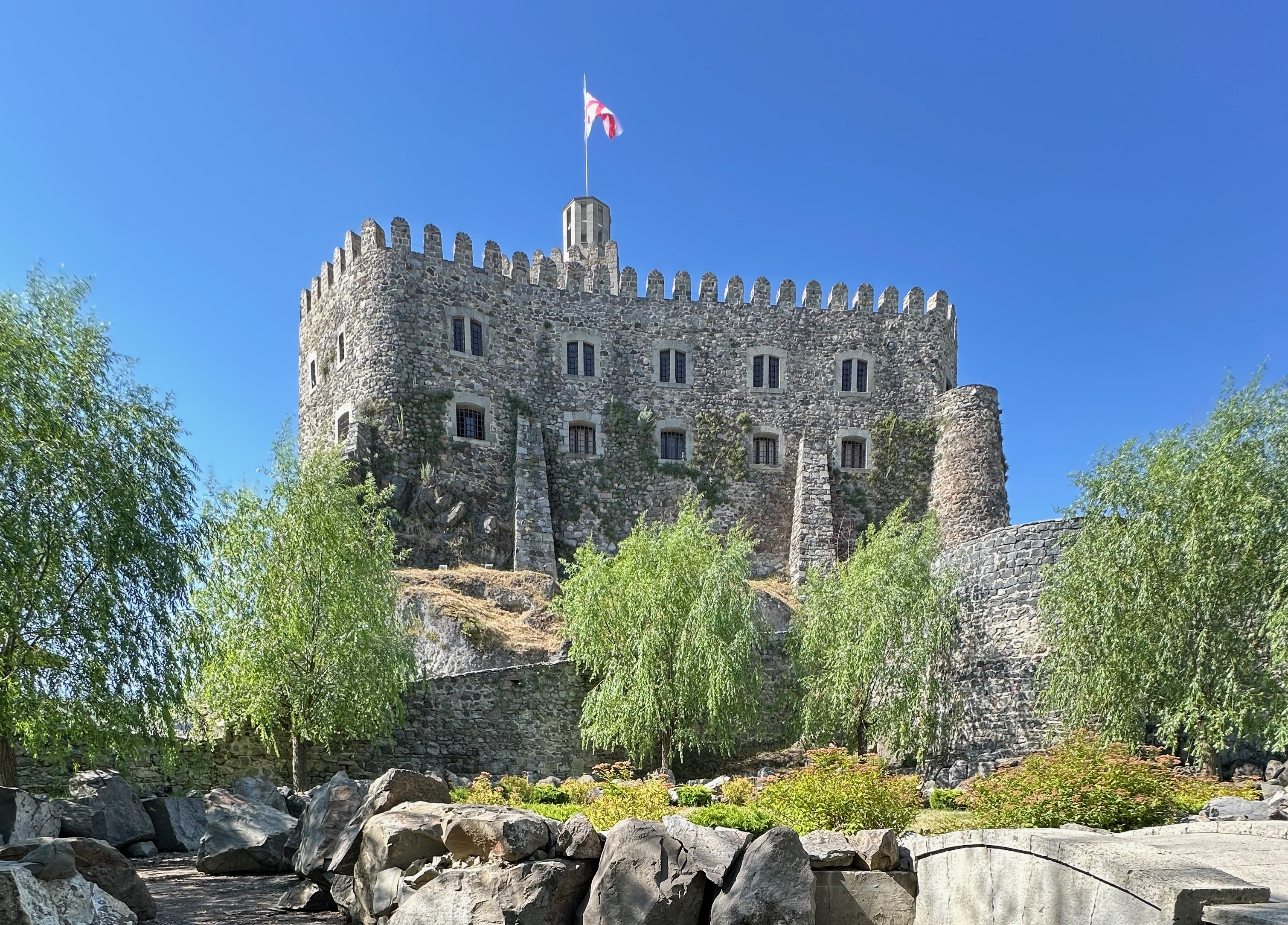

- Flag Seal

- Location within Georgia Location within Samtskhe-Javakheti
- Coordinates: 41°38′20″N 42°59′10″E
- Country: Georgia
- Region: Samtskhe–Javakheti
- Municipality: Akhaltsikhe
- Founded: 1200
- Elevation: 1,029 m (3,376 ft)

Population (2024)
  - Total: 17,287
- Time zone: UTC+4 (Georgian Time)
- Postal code: 0800
- Website: akhaltsikhe.gov.ge/en

Akhaltsikhe (Georgian: ახალციხე [äχäɫt̪͡s̪ʰiχe̞]), formerly known as Lomsia (Georgian: ლომსია [ɫo̞ms̪iä]), is a city in Georgia's southwestern region (mkhare) of Samtskhe–Javakheti. It is the administrative center of the Akhaltsikhe Municipality and the Samtskhe–Javakheti region. In 2024, by census reports, the city has a population of 17,287 people. The city lies at an elevation of approximately 1,000 meters (3,280 ft) in the Akhaltsikhe Basin. It is situated on both banks of the small river Potskhovi (a left tributary of the Kura), which divides the city between the old city in the north and new in the south. The Georgian translation of Akhaltsikhe is "new fortress"; this is significant of the city's historical use and background as a fortified settlement, as well as existing as strategic stronghold in a heavily contested region of the Caucasus.

Starting from the 13th century, the city served as the seat for the House of Jaqeli ruling dynasty of Georgia as well as the capital of the Samtskhe-Saatabago principality. The Ottomans captured the city during the Ottoman-Safavid War in the 16th century and maintained authority over the city for nearly 250 years. In 1828, Russian forces recaptured the city from the Turks and formally incorporated it into the Russian Empire via the Treaty of Adrianople in 1829.

The 9th-century Akhaltsikhe Castle (Rabati), which recently underwent restorations, is located in the old part of the city. The castle represents the city's multicultural history, as it consists of an Orthodox church, a mosque, and a madrasa within its single walled enclosure. It remains as one of the main heritage sights of the region, alongside Vardzia, Khertvisi, Vale, Okrostsikhe and Zarzma.

== Toponymy ==
Akhaltsikhe is the Georgian name of the town, which literally means "new fortress". It is attested in Arabic sources as Akhiskha (and Akhsikhath), in Persian as Akhesqeh (also spelled as Akheshkheh), and in Turkish sources as Ahıska. The Azerbaijani village of Axısxa is also named after it, due to the population of the village originating from Akhaltsikhe.

Before the 12th century, the settlement was known as Lomsia which had been preserved into the medieval period by the Armenians and Persians. The transition of the city's name to Akhaltsikhe is associated with the construction of a new citadel under the ruling House of Jaqeli, which had served as the ruling dynasty in the 13th century. The Turkish variation of the city's name, Ahiska, remains relevant and used by Meskhetian Turk communities and in Turkey, as they use the name to refer to their historical homeland from which they experienced mass deportations by Soviet authorities in November 1944.

== History ==
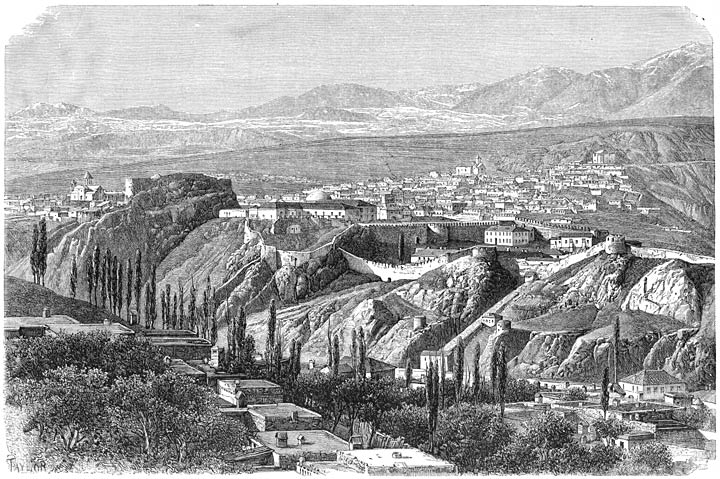
Akhaltsikhe c. 1887

The town is mentioned among the settlements conquered by general Habib ibn Maslama al-Fihri during the reign of Umayyad Caliph Mu'awiya I (661–680). During the Mongol domination of Georgia, local rulers of the House of Jaqeli, who ruled the feudal principality of Samtskhe-Saatabago, were invested with the title of atabeg and were allowed to be autonomous. In contemporaneous Persian and Turkish sources, these Jaqeli rulers were referred to as Ḳurḳūra, which derives from Qvarqvare—the name of several Jaqeli rulers.

In 1579, during the Ottoman–Safavid War of 1578–1590, the Ottomans took the town. In the ensuing period, the Ottomans implanted Islam and Ottoman customs. In 1625, the town became the centre of the Akhalzik Eyalet of the Ottoman Empire known as Ahıska and it held a resident Ottoman pasha. The town rose to strategic importance and became a leading hub of the Caucasian slave market. By the late 17th century, the town was home to 400 households, consisting of a mixed population of Turks, Armenians, Georgians, Greeks and Jews.

In 1828, during the Russo-Turkish War of 1828–1829, Russian troops under the command of General Ivan Paskevich captured the city and, as a consequence of the 1829 Treaty of Adrianople, it was ceded to the Russian Empire. The city, which was made into an Akhaltsikhe uezd, initially became part of the Kutaisi Governorate and was later transferred under the jurisdiction of the Tiflis Governorate.

In the late 1980s the city was host to the Soviet Army's 10th Guards Motor Rifle Division, which became a brigade of the Georgian land forces after the fall of the Soviet Union.

== Population ==
Population and ethnic composition of Akhaltsikhe from the late 19th century
Year	Georgians		Armenians		Russians		Jews		Others		Total
1886	2,733	17%	10,417	64.6%	146	0.9%	2,545	15.8%	275	1.7%	16,116
1897	3,578	23.3%	9,035	58.8%	1,172	7.3%	438	2.9%	1,134	3.4%	15,357
1916	2,783	10.9%	18,165	71.3%	716	2.8%	3,246	12.7%	560	2.2%	25,470
1926	1,817	14.8%	6,516	52.9%	1,425	11.6%	94	0.8%	2,458	20.0%	12,310
1959	6,801	25.7%	14,341	54.1%	3,509	13.2%	368	1.4%	1,478	5.6%	26,497
1979	5,714	29.2%	10,278	52.5%	2,208	11.3%	337	1.7%	1,050	5.4%	19,587
1989											24,570
2014	12,838	71.7%	4,781	26.7%	75	0.4%	11	0.06%	198	1.1%	17,903
2023											16,943

== Jewish community ==
The old synagogue of Akhaltsikhe, which currently serves as a museum

Jews have inhabited Akhaltsikhe since the 6th century Babylonian exile of the Jews. The Jewish community in Akhaltsikhe consists of Sephardic Jews from the Ottoman Empire, Georgian Jews who arrived after the Russo-Turkish War, and Ashkenazi Jews who arrived after the Russian annexation of Georgia. Jews settled in the district west of the Rabati Fortress. Georgian historian Bakhushti Bagrationi first mentions the Jews of Akhaltsikhe in 1745.

In 1830, the Jewish community had 117 families. In 1897, there were 1,738 Jews. At its largest, in 1915, the Jewish community of Akhaltsikhe numbered over 3,500. Most emigrated to Israel in the second half of the 20th century.

There are two synagogues in Akhaltsikhe's historic Jewish quarters; one is still in use, while the other is no longer operational. The non-operational synagogue serves as a museum and tourist location today. The operational synagogue, Akhaltsikhe Synagogue, is maintained by Beniamin Levishvili, the gabbai.

The Jewish cemetery of Akhaltsikhe includes tombs and graves, some of which date back as far as the 17th century. Some of the graves are in Ladino, the language of Sephardic Jews.

The Levishvilis are the only remaining Jewish family in Akhaltsikhe. Shalom Koboshvili (1876-1941) is a Jewish painter from Akhaltsikhe.

== Climate ==
Climate data for Akhaltsikhe (1991–2020, extremes 1981-2020)
Month	Jan	Feb	Mar	Apr	May	Jun	Jul	Aug	Sep	Oct	Nov	Dec	Year
Record high °C (°F)	14.5 (58.1)	20.0 (68.0)	26.0 (78.8)	30.9 (87.6)	32.9 (91.2)	36.6 (97.9)	40.5 (104.9)	40.0 (104.0)	37.0 (98.6)	35.1 (95.2)	26.0 (78.8)	17.5 (63.5)	40.5 (104.9)
Mean daily maximum °C (°F)	3.6 (38.5)	6.0 (42.8)	11.8 (53.2)	17.6 (63.7)	22.3 (72.1)	26.1 (79.0)	29.5 (85.1)	30.3 (86.5)	25.6 (78.1)	19.1 (66.4)	11.2 (52.2)	5.1 (41.2)	17.4 (63.3)
Daily mean °C (°F)	−2.6 (27.3)	−0.9 (30.4)	4.0 (39.2)	9.1 (48.4)	13.9 (57.0)	17.7 (63.9)	21.0 (69.8)	21.1 (70.0)	16.6 (61.9)	10.8 (51.4)	3.9 (39.0)	−1.0 (30.2)	9.5 (49.1)
Mean daily minimum °C (°F)	−6.9 (19.6)	−5.8 (21.6)	−1.8 (28.8)	2.5 (36.5)	7.4 (45.3)	11.3 (52.3)	14.4 (57.9)	14.1 (57.4)	9.6 (49.3)	4.7 (40.5)	−1.1 (30.0)	−5.2 (22.6)	3.6 (38.5)
Record low °C (°F)	−25.5 (−13.9)	−22.2 (−8.0)	−21.4 (−6.5)	−14.1 (6.6)	−2.8 (27.0)	−0.4 (31.3)	4.1 (39.4)	1.5 (34.7)	−1.5 (29.3)	−7.5 (18.5)	−19.5 (−3.1)	−24.3 (−11.7)	−25.5 (−13.9)
Average precipitation mm (inches)	22.3 (0.88)	24.5 (0.96)	36.5 (1.44)	48.6 (1.91)	75.5 (2.97)	75.1 (2.96)	58.4 (2.30)	51.5 (2.03)	39.9 (1.57)	41.9 (1.65)	31.1 (1.22)	25.2 (0.99)	530.5 (20.88)
Average precipitation days (≥ 1.0 mm)	5.1	5.5	6.8	8.6	12.4	11	8.1	7.8	6.5	7.3	5.4	5.6	90.1
Average relative humidity (%)	81	77.7	72.9	71.9	73.6	73.7	70.2	68.8	71.4	76.6	80.3	82.2	75.0
Source: NOAA

== Archaeology ==
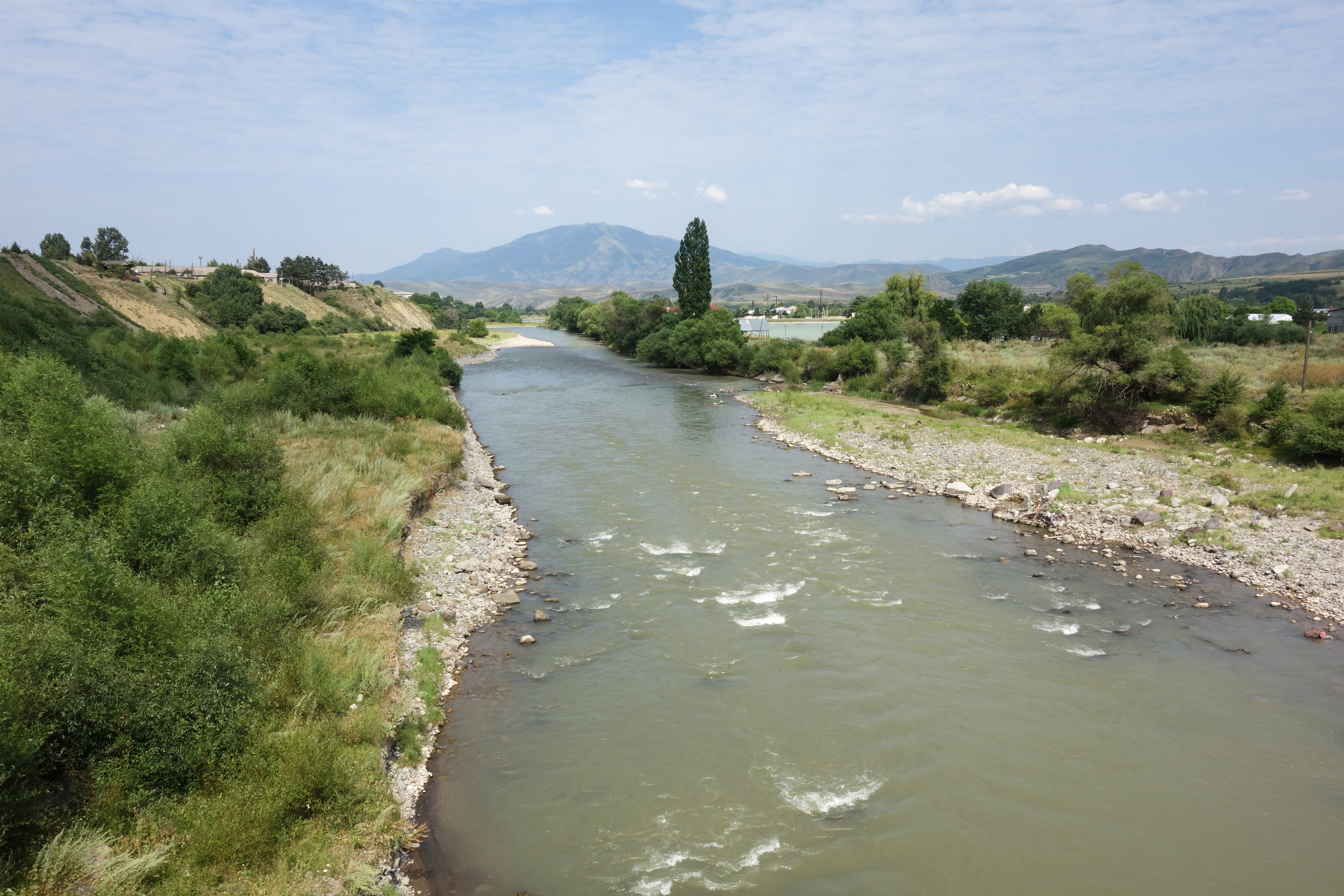
Potskhovistskali river heading into Akhaltsikhe

The highland environment between Akhaltsikhe and Aspindza presents a varied and complex array of archaeological features in different locations, elevations and topographies. This includes the alluvial flood-plain of the Kura River, all the way to the high grasslands.

Human habitation is attested already in the Early Bronze Age (4th millennium BC) and later. Artifacts from the Roman and medieval periods are also strongly represented in the area.

=== Amiranis Gora ===
The important archaeological site of Amiranis Gora is located on the northeastern outskirts of Akhaltsikhe. It was excavated by Tariel Chubinishvili. The earliest carbon date for Amiranis Gora is 3790-3373 cal BC. It was obtained from the charcoal of the metallurgical workshop which belonged to the earliest building horizon of Amiranis Gora. This indicates a division of metallurgical production into extractive and processing branches.

Amiranis Gora is an important reference point for the study of the Early Bronze Age Kura–Araxes culture, also known as the Early Transcaucasian Culture. The many references include the architecture, burial practices, material culture and metallurgy. Amiranis Gora is one of the best sites with fixed stratigraphy of the Kura-Araxes culture. The carbon date for the Kura-Araxes material at Amiranis Gora is 3630-3048 cal B.C., which is very early.

== People associated with Akhaltsikhe ==
- Gregorio Pietro Agagianian (1895–1971), Patriarch of Cilicia and the Armenian Catholic Church, Cardinal, and first Eastern Catholic papabile since Cardinal Bessarion during the Renaissance
- Charles Aznavour, world-famous French singer and songwriter of Armenian descent (father, Michael Aznavourian, was born in Akhaltsikhe)
- David Baazov, rabbi at Akhaltsikhe (1918)
- Shio Batmanishvili, hieromonk of the Servites of the Immaculate Conception, first Exarch of the Georgian Greek Catholic Church, and survivor of Solovki prison camp. Martyred by the NKVD during Joseph Stalin's Great Purge and buried in the mass grave at Sandarmokh in the Republic of Karelia.
- Hovhannes Kajaznuni (1868–1938), first prime minister of the First Republic of Armenia
- Ahmed-Pasha Khimshiashvili (?–1836), Pasha of Ahiska
- Sergo Kobuladze (1909–1978), painter and illustrator
- Hakob Kojoyan (1883–1959), Soviet Armenian artist
- Shalva Maglakelidze, plenipotentiary for the Russian Provisional Government and then for the government of Georgia in Akhaltsikhe (1917–1918)
- Stepan Malkhasyants, Armenian academician
- Hakob Manandian, Armenian historian
- Palavandishvili family
- Giorgi Mazniashvili, governor general of Akhaltsikhe (1919–1920)
- Natela Svanidze, Georgian composer
- Michel Tamarati (1858–1911), Georgian Catholic priest and historian
- Vakhtang Tchutchunashvili (?–1668), usurper of the throne of Imereti, fled to Ahiska after being deposed
- Lusine Zakaryan (1937–1991), Soviet Armenian soprano singer

== International relations ==
=== Twin towns and sister cities ===
Akhaltsikhe is twinned with:

- Ardahan, Turkey

== Notable people ==
- Artur Grigoryan, Russian-Armenian former football player
- Aida Babajanyan, Armenian-Georgian actress and dancer
- Hovhannes Kajaznuni, Armenian politician, First Prime Minister of Armenia
- Karp Khachvankyan, Armenian actor and director, People's Artist of Armenia (1967)
- Shalom Koboshvili, Georgian Jewish painter

== See also ==
- Battle of Akhaltsikhe
- Samtskhe–Javakheti
