= Battle of Akhaltsikhe =

1828 battle in the Russo-Turkish War

Battles of Akhaltsikhe
- Part of Russo-Turkish War of 1828–29
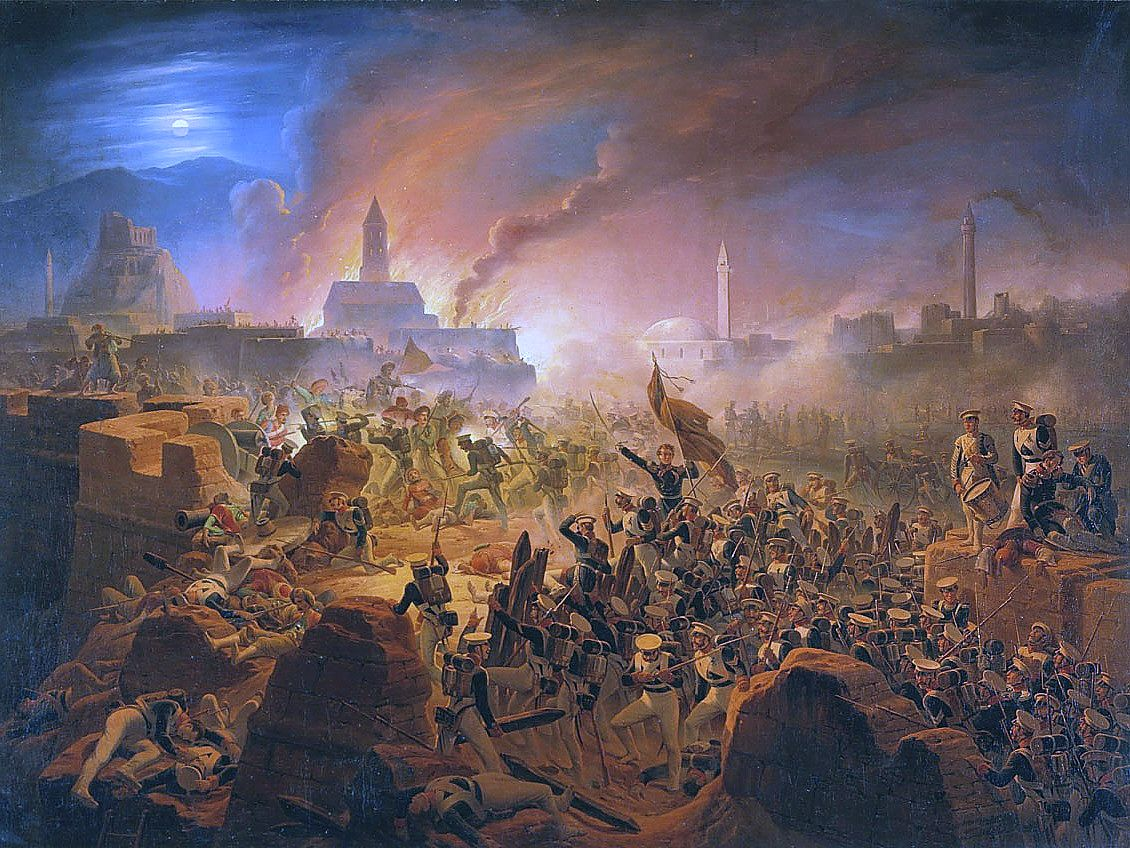
- Siege of Akhaltsikhe 1828, by January Suchodolski
Date	August 21–28, 1828 (offensive–storming) (Note: The beleaguering began on the 22nd.); March 3–16, 1829 (defence)
Location	Akhaltsikhe and its castle 41°38′20″N 42°59′10″E
Result	Russian victory

Belligerents
Russian Empire	Ottoman Empire

Commanders and leaders
Offensive–Storming; Field-Marshal Paskevich; Defence; Nicholas Muravyov; Vasili Bebutov	Offensive–Storming; Kios-Mahomet-Pasha; Defence; Ahmed-Bey

Strength
Offensive–Storming; 9,000–10,000/11,000; Defence; 1,164	Offensive–Storming; 30,000 (mostly irregular army; ~10,000 regulars in the offensive); Defence; 5,000 regular infantry; 15,000 militias

Casualties and losses
Offensive; >400 (up to 500); Siege & storming; 1,600; Defence; 100	Offensive; Killed or wounded: 1,500–2,000.; Captured: 500.; Siege & storming; 5,000; Defence; Up to 4,000

The Battle of Akhaltsikhe during the Russo-Turkish War, 1828–1829, may refer to one of the following. Firstly, an offensive battle under the walls of Akhaltsikhe on August 21 (August 9 O.S.), 1828, between 9,000 Russians under Field-Marshal Paskevich on the offensive and 30,000 Turks under Kios-Mahomet-Pasha. The Russians were victorious by a swift and surprise attack in a heavy thunderstorm. They then successfully stormed the Akhaltsikhe Castle (28 (O.S. 16) August 1828) after a week-long siege. Secondly, a successful Russian defense of the same fortress by a garrison under generals Nicholas Muravyov and Vasili Bebutov from a 20,000 Turkish force under Ahmed-Bey on March 3–16 (February 20 – March 4 O.S.), 1829, during the same conflict.

== Background ==
Akhaltsikhe is in the center of Samtskhe-Javakheti, with a population of about 20,000. Akhaltsikhe was founded in the 12th century, but the first large settlement had arrived in the 10th century by Guaram Mampal, son of a king Tao. The settlement was a family of princes who were trying to take over Georgia. The family built a fortress and named the city Akhaltsikhe, because in Georgian, "Akhaltsikhe" means "new fortress" or "new castle." The capital and main city of Akhaltsikhe, Samtskhe-Saatabago, was ruled by a prince named Mtavari. The castle was the Samtskhe main down in the Samtskhe Atabeg region, located on the bank of the Potskhovi River. After the Treaty of Georgievsk between the kingdom of Kartli and Akhaltsikhe (another nearby kingdom) and the Russian Empire, there was a risk that Akhaltsikhe could get attacked. In 1578, Akhaltsikhe was seized by Turks of the Ottoman Empire. The Ottomans had been trying to conquer Akhaltsikhe for a long time, and they never succeeded.

The city is divided into two sections, an old city on the hill of Akhaltsikhe, and a new area on the plains. The Rabat fortress rehabilitation project began in 2011, and the city of Akhaltsikhe has become one of the most important tourist attractions in Georgia.

== Action development ==
The Battle of Akhaltsikhe was part of the Russo-Turkish war and was also known as the Siege of Akhaltsikhe in 1828. The battle started on August 21, 1828 in Akhaltsikhe, Georgia. The siege lasted three weeks. The city of Akhaltsikhe (a former Soviet Union republic) is at the intersection of Europe and Asia, located right next to Armenia. The Russians took over the city of Akhaltsikhe after eighteen years in 1828. Approximately 9,000 Russians under their general Count Ivan Paskevich, and 30,000 Turks under the command of Kios-Mahomet-Pasha; the Russians captured Kars, Turkey, and attempted to steal the fortress of Akhaltsikhe. Akhaltsikhe fell in three weeks after heavy assault. The Russians, Turks, and Georgians all incurred heavy losses.

== Aftermath ==
After the Russians took Akhaltsikhe, they went into Turkey and fought for the city of Adrianople, Turkey. The first Russian attempt was to take Rabat's fortress in 1810 and they succeeded. During the Russian-Turkish war of 1828 in the battle of Akhaltsikhe, the Turkish army retreated and surrendered the Rabati fortress. The Ottoman Empire's motive for seizing the city was to claim more land and expand their empire. Russian troops fought for Akhaltsikhe, therefore the Turks could not claim the fortress. Since Akhaltsikhe was an important commerce route for the Circassian slave trade in the 18th century, the Russians wanted to own this land too. The Rabat castle complex survived the war, but was in very poor condition and had to be restored years later. During the war, monasteries, were destroyed.

== See also ==
- A battle between 7,000 Russian troops consisting mostly of Georgian irregular cavalrymen under Prince Ivan Malkhazovich Andronnikov (Andronikashvili) and 18,000 Turks under Ali-Pasha during the Crimean War, on November 12 (O.S.), 1853. The Russians checked Turkish offensive in Transcaucasia and made them retreat to Kars.
