= Akhaltsikhe Castle =

Georgian fortress

- ახალციხის ციხე
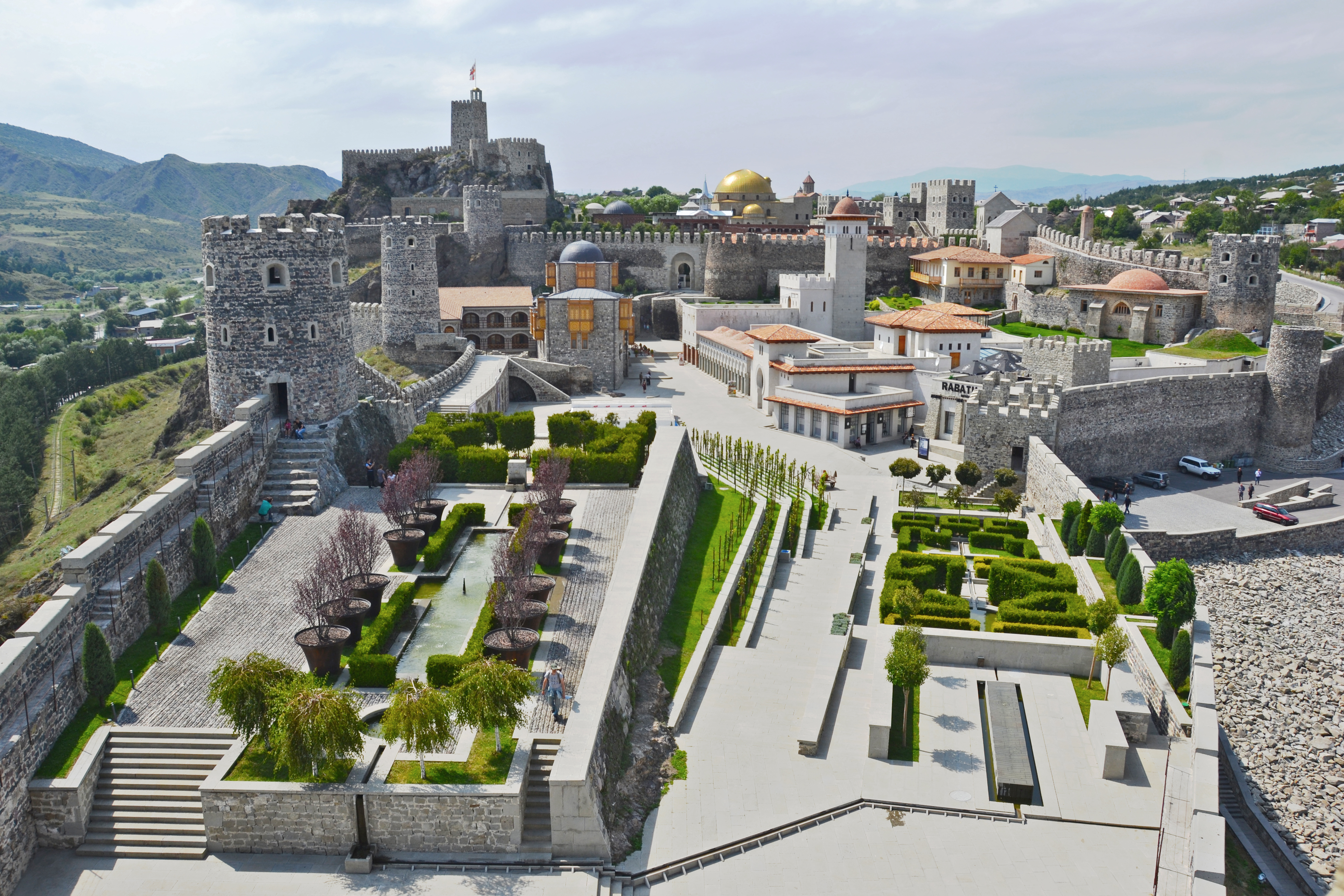

- Location within Georgia Location within Samtskhe-Javakheti
- Former names: Lomsia

General information
- Location: Akhaltsikhe, Samtskhe-Javakheti, Georgia
- Coordinates: 41°38′33.6″N 42°58′37.4″E
- Elevation: 1,000 m (3,281 ft)
- Completed: 9th century
- Renovated: 2012
- Renovation cost: 26₾ mln ($8 mln)
- Client: Guaram Mampali

Technical details
- Floor area: 70,000 m^{2} (750,000 sq ft)

Akhaltsikhe (Rabati) Castle (Georgian: ახალციხის (რაბათის) ციხე) is a medieval fortress built in the 9th century under the name "Lomsia Castle" in the city of Akhaltsikhe in southern Georgia, recently reconstructed. One of the main attractions of the Samtskhe-Javakheti region along with Vardzia.

== Name ==
The original name of the fortress in the 9th century was Lomsia, which can be translated from Georgian as "Lion". At the end of the 12th century, Lomsia acquired the new name Akhal-tsikhe, which literally translates as “New fortress”, the Arabic name "Rabati" means fortress. Rabati was usually called the trading quarter at the fortress, earlier mainly Jewish merchants and craftsmen lived in the Rabat quarter, however mainly after reconstruction the name stuck to the all fortress itself. On the official web site of municipality of Akhaltsikhe town and on the official Facebook page of the fortress the name is "Akhaltsikhe (Rabati) Castle" was used or just "Akhaltsikhe Castle." In most of all historical documents castle is mentioned as Akhaltsikhe castle

== History ==
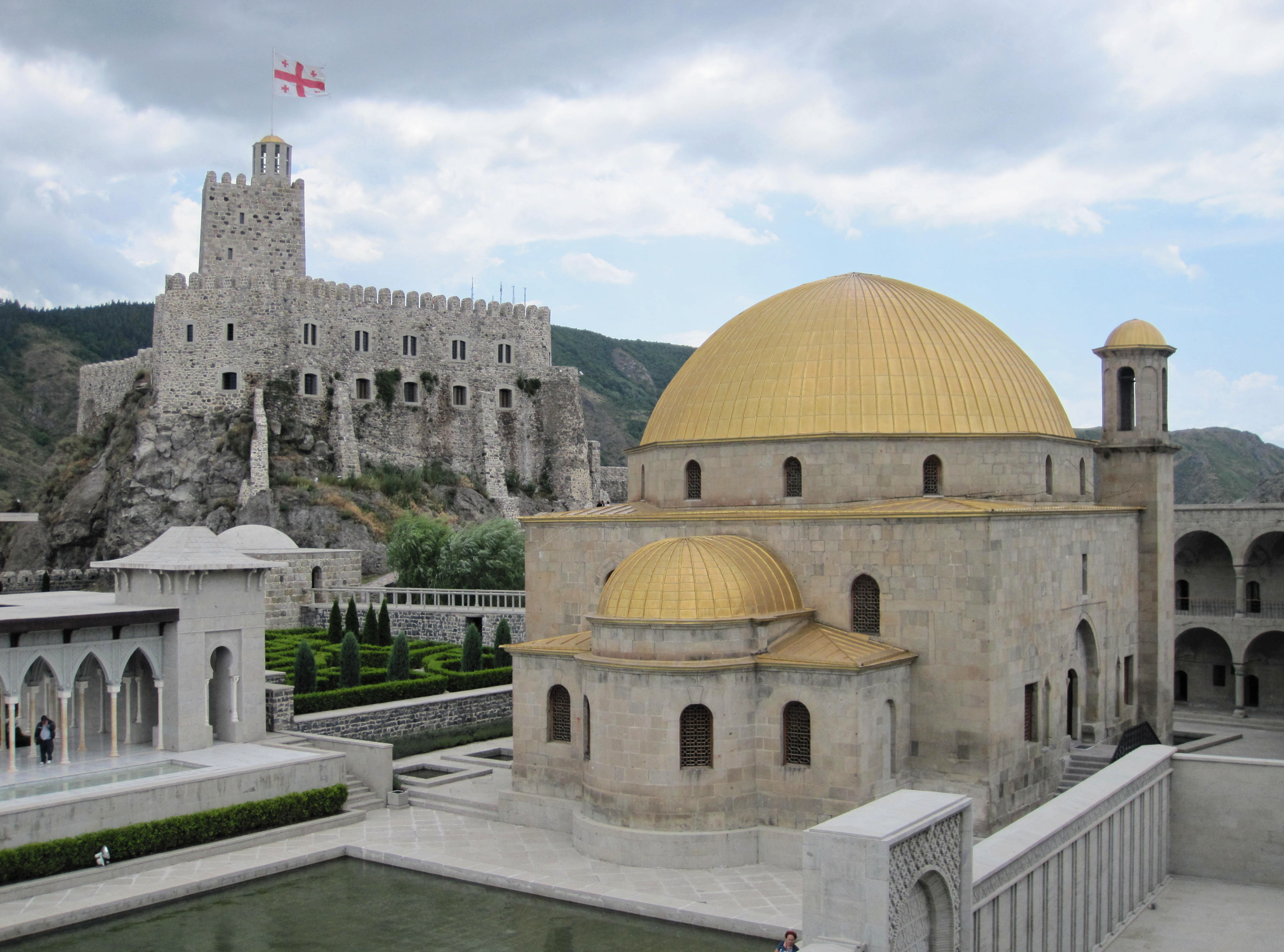
Inside the Akhaltsikhe Fortress

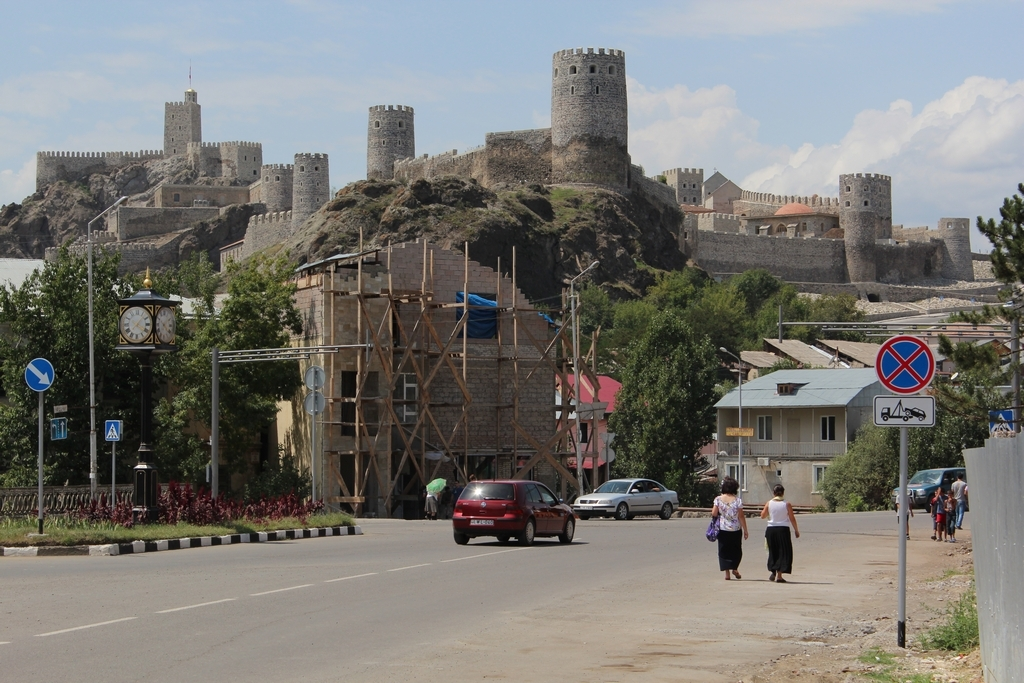
Akhaltsikhe Castle view from the Didimamishvili street

According to the Georgian Chronicles the city was established in the 9th century by Guaram Mampali, son of the King of Tao. At the end of the 12th century Lomsia turned into a real city with the new name Akhal-tsikhe (New Fortress), which in addition to the fortress had a serious system of city-wide fortifications – high walls, guarded entrance gates and watch towers. From the 13th to the end of 14th centuries it was the capital city of Samtskhe-Saatabago, ruled by the Georgian princely (mtavari) family and a ruling dynasty of the Principality of Samtskhe, the House of Jaqeli.

In 1393 the city was attacked by the armies of Tamerlane. Despite the Turko-Mongol invasions, the fortress withstood and continued to thrive. After the Treaty of Constantinople in 1590, the whole territory of Samtskhe-Saatabago came under the rule of Ottoman Empire.

Metropolitan John writes in the late 18th century that "despite the fact that a large part of the population has been Islamized, there's still a functioning Orthodox church." After the Treaty of Georgievsk between the Kingdom of Kartli and the Russian Empire was signed, the question of the fate of Akhaltsikhe arose. The first attempt to take the fortress in 1810 failed. However, Prince Paskevich successfully stormed the fortress 18 years later, in the great Battle of Akhaltsikhe. After the Treaty of Adrianople in 1829, the Ottomans yielded this part of Akhaltsikhe Region.

The fortress and its adjacent buildings were extensively rebuilt and renovated in 2011–2012 in order to attract more tourists to the area.

== Architecture ==
Akhaltsikhe originally consisted of three parts: the castle, the surrounding citadel and the greater city proper. The castle was surrounded by three ramparts and was connected with adjacent areas by tunnels. Within the citadel, aside from the castle, there was a large courtyard, an arsenal, a mint, a bath and a church. In 1752, Georgian ruler Haji Ahmed-Pasha Jaqeli built a mosque within the castle in the style of the Byzantine Orthodox Church Hagia Sophia of Constantinople using the typical structure of a Georgian Orthodox church, with an added madrasah and a minaret. The mosque functioned for 76 years until 1828. Later, in 1850 by order of the Russian emperor, it was consecrated in the name of the Virgin Mary and functioned as a church for another 92 years until 1920.

== Restoration ==
In May 2011, the reconstruction of the Rabati fortress began, which was accompanied by the restoration and completion of many buildings that were destroyed in time immemorial. For this purpose, the Government of Georgia allocated 34 million lari from the state budget. As part of the project, the Akhmediye Mosque, the mosque minaret, the madrasah, the Jakeli castle, baths, the citadel, the walls of the fortress and the Orthodox Church were updated on the territory of the fortress. The tunnel leading to the Potskhovi River was also restored. As part of the project, two main streets of the fortress were repaired, a pavement was equipped, and the facades and roofs of buildings were restored.

== Panorama ==
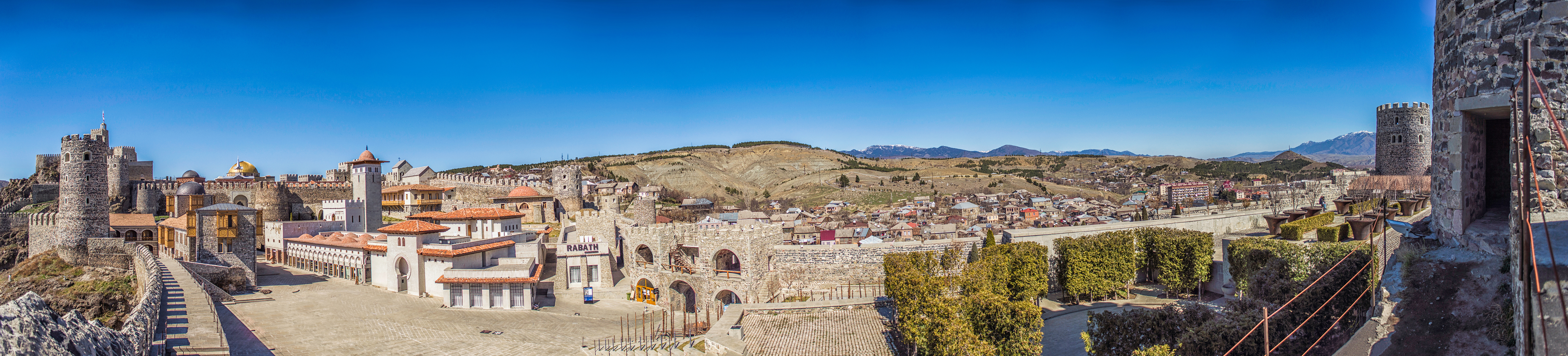
Rabati Castle panorama
