= Akhaltsikhe Synagogue =

Georgian synagogue

- Georgian: ახალციხის სინაგოგა
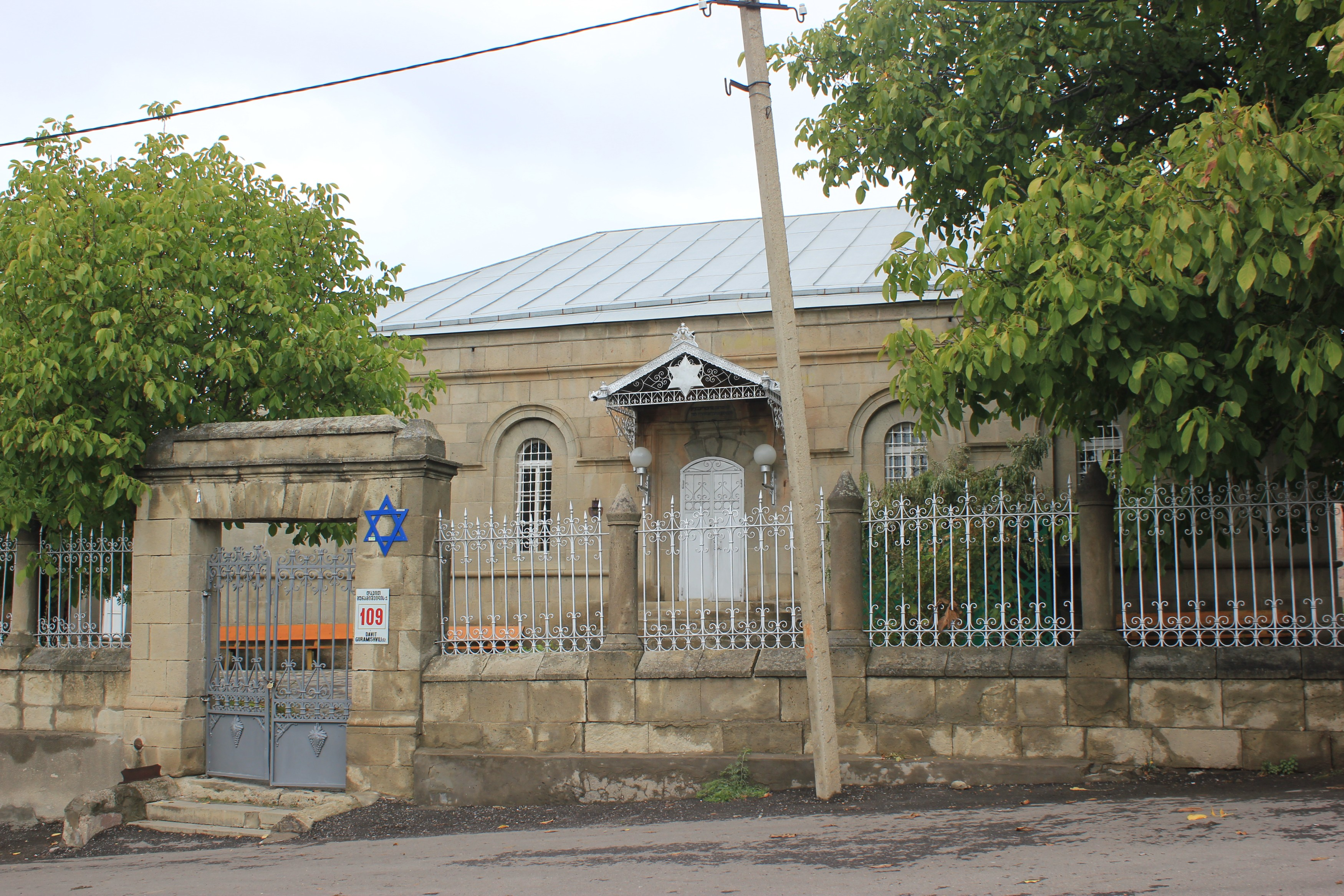
- Exterior of the synagogue in 2020

- Location of the synagogue in Georgia

Religion
- Affiliation: Judaism
- Rite: Georgian Jewish
- Ecclesiastical or organisational status: Synagogue
- Status: Partially active

Location
- Location: JXVJ+X4G, Akhaltsikhe
- Country: Georgia
- Coordinates: 41.644949°N 42.980494°E

Architecture
- Type: Neoclassical architecture
- Completed: 1862-63
- Materials: Stone

The Akhaltsikhe Synagogue (Georgian: ახალციხის სინაგოგა), is a synagogue, located in the old Rabati district of Akhaltsikhe, in the republic of Georgia.

== History ==
An inscription on the south wall of the synagogue dates its building in 1862, supposedly making it the oldest synagogue in Georgia. According to other sources, it was finished in 1863.

In 1952, the Soviet government under Stalin closed the synagogue. The local Jewish community managed to receive permission to reopen the synagogue only in 1986.

The synagogue was largely renovated in 2012. Nowadays, the synagogue is practically inactive due to the migration of all the Jewish population of the city. However, the son of the former Rabbi takes care of the synagogue, opening it to the public for tours and special occasions. Now it works also as a museum, showcasing artefacts, mostly for Israeli tourists. The Akhaltsikhe synagogue still keeps several historical items of great religious importance, such as two Sifrei Torah.

== Architecture ==
The synagogue is made of two halls: the upper is reserved to women, and its decorated with geometric patterns; the lower one is reserved to men for the daily prayers. The building is made of stone, and it is done in a neo-classical style. The interior is instead made of painted wood.
