= Artur Grigoryan (footballer) =

Russian-Armenian footballer (born 1985)

Personal information
- Full name: Artur Akopovich Grigoryan
- Date of birth: 29 January 1985 (age 41)
- Place of birth: Akhaltsikhe, Georgian SSR
- Height: 1.78 m (5 ft 10 in)
- Position: Forward

Senior career*
Years	Team	Apps	(Gls)
2005	Chernomorets Novorossiysk	27	(5)
2006–2007	Bokelj		
2007	Trud Voronezh		
2008	Lokomotiv Liski	34	(16)
2009	Metallurg Lipetsk	24	(3)
2010	Chernomorets Novorossiysk	13	(3)
2010	Salyut Belgorod	15	(4)
2011	Dnepr Mogilev	20	(2)
2012–2013	Chernomorets Novorossiysk	38	(7)
2013–2014	Vityaz Krymsk	29	(6)
2015–2016	Dynamo Stavropol	21	(4)
2016–2018	Chernomorets Novorossiysk	53	(16)
2019	Dynamo Stavropol	24	(6)
- * Club domestic league appearances and goals

Artur Akopovich Grigoryan (Russian: Артур Акопович Григорян; born 29 January 1985) is a Russian-Armenian former football player.

== Club career ==
Grigoryan previously played for FC Metallurg Lipetsk in the Russian First Division.
