= Axısxa =

- Municipality
- Location within Azerbaijan
- Coordinates: 40°05′22″N 48°32′10″E
- Country: Azerbaijan
- Rayon: Sabirabad

Population
  - Total: 1,373
- Time zone: UTC+4 (AZT)
  - Summer (DST): UTC+5 (AZT)

Axısxa is a village and municipality in the Sabirabad Rayon of Azerbaijan. It has a population of 1,373.

== Etymology ==
The village of Axısxa is named after the Georgian city of Akhaltsikhe, which was formerly known as Axısxa in Azerbaijani. This is because the population of the village are Meskhetian Turks, who were deported from Akhaltsikhe to Central Asia in 1944. In the 1960s, they returned to the Caucasus and founded this settlement, which they named after their former hometown.
