= Natela Svanidze =

Georgian composer (1926–2017)

Natela Svanidze (Georgian: ნათელა დამიანეს ასული სვანიძე, Natela Damien asuli Svanidze; Russian: Натела Дамиановна Сванидзе, Natela Damianovna Svanidze; 4 September 1926 – 17 November 2017) was a Georgian composer.

== Biography ==
Natela Svanidze was born in Akhaltsikhe, Georgia. She studied composition at Tbilisi State Conservatoire with Andria Balanchivadze, graduating in 1951. She was awarded the title of Honored Artist of Georgia in 1981.

Svanidze died on 17 November 2017, at the age of 91.

== Works ==
Svanidze composes for orchestra, chamber ensemble, solo instrument and experimental performances. Selected works include:

- 1949 – "Symphony Dances" for orchestra
- 1951 – "Samgori" symphony poem
- 1963 – "Kvarkvare" symphony poem
- 1965 – "Burlesque" for piano, wind and percussion instruments
- 1967 – Symphony for piano, string and percussion instruments
- 1968 – Symphony-ballet for symphony orchestra
- 1983 – Symphony No. 2
- 1954 – "Garden of Kartli" cantata for mixed chorus and symphony orchestra. (in three parts), text by Giorgi Leonidze
- 1970 – "Pirosmani" chamber oratorio for reader, contralto, male sextet and instrumental ensemble (in five parts), texts by Boris Pasternak, Pavel Antokolsky, Titsian Tabidze
- 1975 – "Poem of Never-to-be-forgotten" oratorio for reader, female sextet, two choruses, organ, violin, 12 cellos, flute and tape (in six parts), text by Irakli Charkviani
- 1956 – Improvisation for violin and piano
- 1960 – "Fairytale" eight variations for piano
- 1972 – "Circle" piece for two prepared pianos
- 1952 – "Zoia" ballade for bass and piano, text by Ioseb Noneshvili
- 1954 – "Daybreak" for female chorus a cappella, text by Giorgi Orbeliani
