= Szentlőrinckáta =

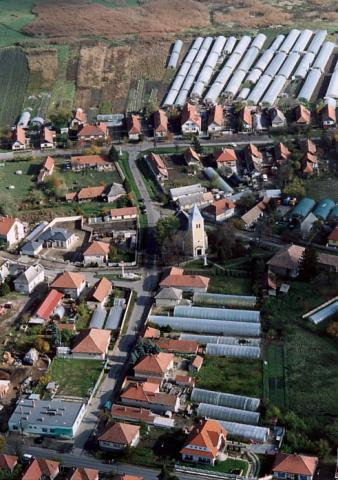

- Coat of arms

- Location of Szentlőrinckáta in Hungary
- Coordinates: 47°31′18.91″N 19°45′18.79″E
- Country: Hungary
- Region: Central Hungary
- County: Pest
- Subregion: Nagykátai
- Rank: Village

Area
  - Total: 20.15 km^{2} (7.78 sq mi)
- Time zone: UTC+1 (CET)
  - Summer (DST): UTC+2 (CEST)
- Postal code: 2255
- Area code: +36 29
- Website: www.szentlorinckata.hu

Szentlőrinckáta is a village in Pest county, Hungary. The mayor is currently Istvan Nagy.
