= Szentmártonkáta =

Szentmártonkáta (Saint Martin)
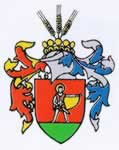
- Coat of arms

- Location of Szentmártonkáta in Hungary
- Coordinates: 47°26′50.71″N 19°41′35.09″E
- Country: Hungary
- Region: Central Hungary
- County: Pest
- Subregion: Nagykátai
- Rank: Village

Area
  - Total: 52.19 km^{2} (20.15 sq mi)

Population (1 January 2008)
  - Total: 4,998
  - Density: 95.77/km^{2} (248.0/sq mi)
- Time zone: UTC+1 (CET)
  - Summer (DST): UTC+2 (CEST)
- Postal code: 2254
- Area code: +36 29
- KSH code: 28653
- Website: www.szentmartonkata.hu

Szentmártonkáta (Saint Martin) is a village in Pest county, Hungary.
