= Siege of Kars (1828) =

Action of the Russo-Turkish War

- Part of Russo-Turkish War (1828–1829)
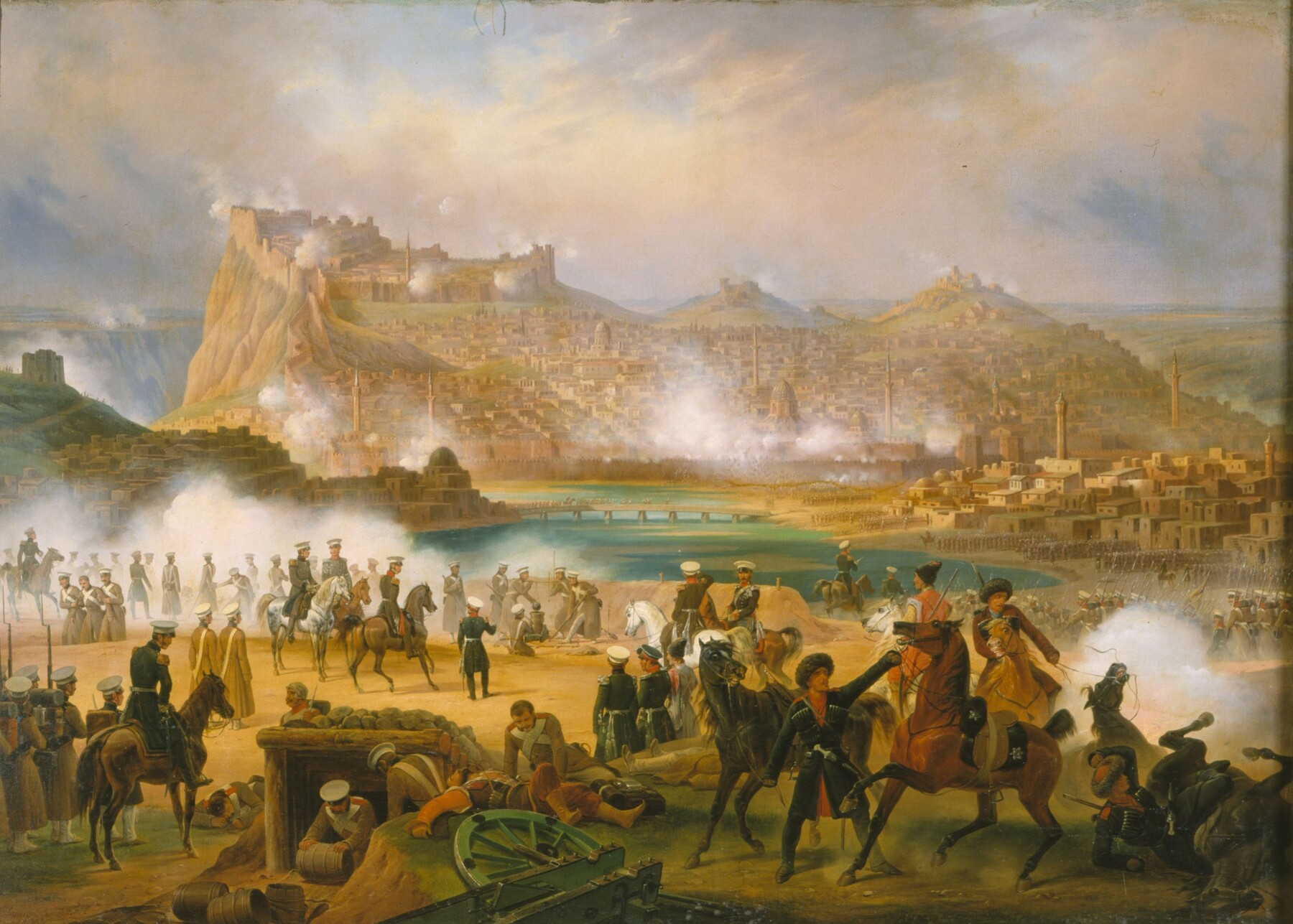
- Siege of Kars by January Suchodolski
Date	20–23 June 1828
Location	Kars, Anatolia
Result	Russian victory

Belligerents
Russian Empire	Ottoman Empire

Commanders and leaders
(Russian Empire) Ivan Paskevich	(Ottoman Empire) Emin Pasha (POW)

Strength
8,000 soldiers	~11,000 garrison 151 guns

Casualties and losses
~400 killed and wounded	2,000 killed and wounded 1,350 captured 151 guns captured

The siege of Kars was part of the Caucasian front of the Russo-Turkish War of 1828-1829. Russian troops, under the command of Count Ivan Paskevich, besieged the Turkish fortress of Kars. The siege lasted approximately three days (June 20–23), much of which was devoted to laying the first parallel and installing siege weapons. Following the assault on June 23, the Kars fortress fell to the onslaught of Russian arms.

== Prelude ==
The Russian campaign in the Caucasus in 1828, which followed immediately after the end of the war with the Persians, was limited to the territory between the Black Sea and Caspian Sea.

The Emperor's task for the Caucasian army, entrusted to General Paskevich, was to divert Turkish forces from the Danube, the center of the war, and capture points that would narrow and secure the Russian border in the Caucasus and Asia Minor.

The Russian Caucasian Corps numbered at least 15,000 men, but these were superior forces compared to those of the Turks or Persians. Paskevich, having occupied the most advantageous strategic position, spent all of May improving the roads to Yerevan in the south and Tiflis in the north, and on June 14, he set out for Kars, located 40 miles away, with an 8,000-man detachment.

Kars Fortress, one of the main strongholds in Anatolia, was defended by an 11,000-strong garrison and 151 guns. Consisting of a double row of walls, three citadels, and several outer fortifications, it successfully resisted a 90,000-strong army under Nader Shah in 1735, as well as Russian troops in 1807.Kars posed less of a threat to the enemy at that time than it did later in 1855 or 1877.

== Siege ==
At the beginning of the siege, on June 19, a Turkish cavalry sortie of 5,000 soldiers was launched to hinder the siege works. However, it was quickly repelled, with the Turks suffering 200 wounded, 100 killed, and 30 captured. The Russian side, however, suffered minor losses: 12 killed and 39 wounded. During the rest of the evening, shooting continued from the fortress.

On June 20, the Russians expected another Turkish sortie. Since the cavalry had suffered the most damage during the sortie on June 19, the Russians did not expect further action from them. However, the infantry, which Emin Pasha could use to attack Russian soldiers, was a boon.

In response to the Russian advance toward the northern heights, the Turks sent 1,500 infantry. Soon, the Russians outflanked the Turks, striking them with bayonets and driving them from their trenches. Turkish attempts to recapture the trenches proved futile. As a result of the fighting, Russian losses were estimated at a few men, while Turkish losses were estimated at 80. June 21 passed without major action between the two sides.

Following the success of Colonels Raevsky and Borodinov's night attacks on June 22, news arrived that Kios Mehmed Pasha was approaching Kars to lift the siege. Upon learning of this, Ivan Paskevich scheduled the assault on the fortress for June 25.

=== The Assault ===
Dawn on June 23 began with fire between Turkish and Russian batteries. After the Turkish fire ceased, some Turkish infantry took up positions near the cemetery—an important defensive point in Kars —and began shelling the Russian trenches from there. Commander Labintsev, without orders, decided to advance forward to drive the Turks from the cemetery, and then even attempted to capture a Turkish battery.

The cemetery and the fortified camp that followed were long and courageously contested, especially the cemetery, which was defended stone by stone until finally recaptured by the Russians.

However, the Turks launched a counterattack: the Turks, numbering up to 2,000 men, pushed back most of the attacking forces to the cemetery, and Miklashevsky himself, with a small detachment, was cut off and surrounded by the Turks. At this moment one incident changed the whole aspect of affairs. The priest of the Armenian regiment, holding high the Cross, threw himself in front of the fleeing riflemen, shouting: «Stop, children! Is it possible that you will abandon here both me and the Cross of our Saviour? If, indeed, you are neither Russians nor Christians-run. I shall know how to die alone!» The flight was arrested, order restored, the Turks driven back and Miklashevsky saved.

Meanwhile, Colonel Burtsev advanced toward Temir Pasha's Tower. After a fierce and short battle, the Russians captured it. By the time Temir Pasha was captured under the command of General Gillenschmidt , the heights of the Turkish camp were occupied, and Colonel Boradinov drove the Turks out of the stone fortifications, thus forming a second parallel and three batteries, proceeded to bombard at short distance the main walls and citadel of Kars, effectually preventing the arrival of any more Turkish reserves.

On the advice of his chief of staff, Baron Osten-Sacken, Paskevich ordered an assault on the remaining fortifications, Orta-kepi and Karadag. Almost the entire besieging army was engaged in battle, and having stormed these positions, the troops simultaneously, without orders and unseen by each other, launched a decisive assault of Kars.

In a very short time, the entire fortress was in Russian hands, with the exception of the citadel, where the Turkish Pasha had taken refuge. There was some delay, but after considerable negotiations, the gates were opened, and on June 23 at 10:00 a.m., Kars fall.

== Aftermath ==
The fall of Kars was one of the most impressive episodes in Russian military history. Among the Russian trophies were 151 guns and 33 standards; 1,350 men were captured, including the pasha and his staff. The Russians lost only 400 officers and men killed and wounded, while the Turks lost 2,000 killed and wounded.

Meanwhile, Kios Mehmed Pasha, who with his 20,000-man force was an hour's march from Kars, learned of its capitulation and retreated to Ardahan.

== Sources ==
- Baddeley, John Frederick (1999). The Russian Conquest of the Caucasus. Psychology Press. ISBN 978-0-7007-0634-1 – via Google Books.
- Vasily Potto, Alexander (1889). Кавказская война в отдельных очерках, эпизодах, легендах и биографиях. Printing house of E. Evdokimov – via Runivers.
- Chesney, Francis (1854). The Russo-Turkish Campaigns of 1828 and 1829. Smith, Elder & Company – via Google Books.
- Ushakov, Nikolai (1836). История военных действий в Азиатской Турции в 1828 и 1829 годах. Printing house of Eduard Pratz – via Runivers.
- Lukyanovich, Andrey (1844). Описание Турецкой войны 1828 и 1829 годов. Vol. 2. Printing house of Eduard Pratz – via State Public Historical Library of Russia.
