= Ivan Paskevich =

Russian military leader (1782–1856)

Serene Prince Ivan Fyodorovich Paskevich Erevansky
- Иванъ Ѳедоровичъ Паскевичъ (Note: Pre-1918 Russian orthography)
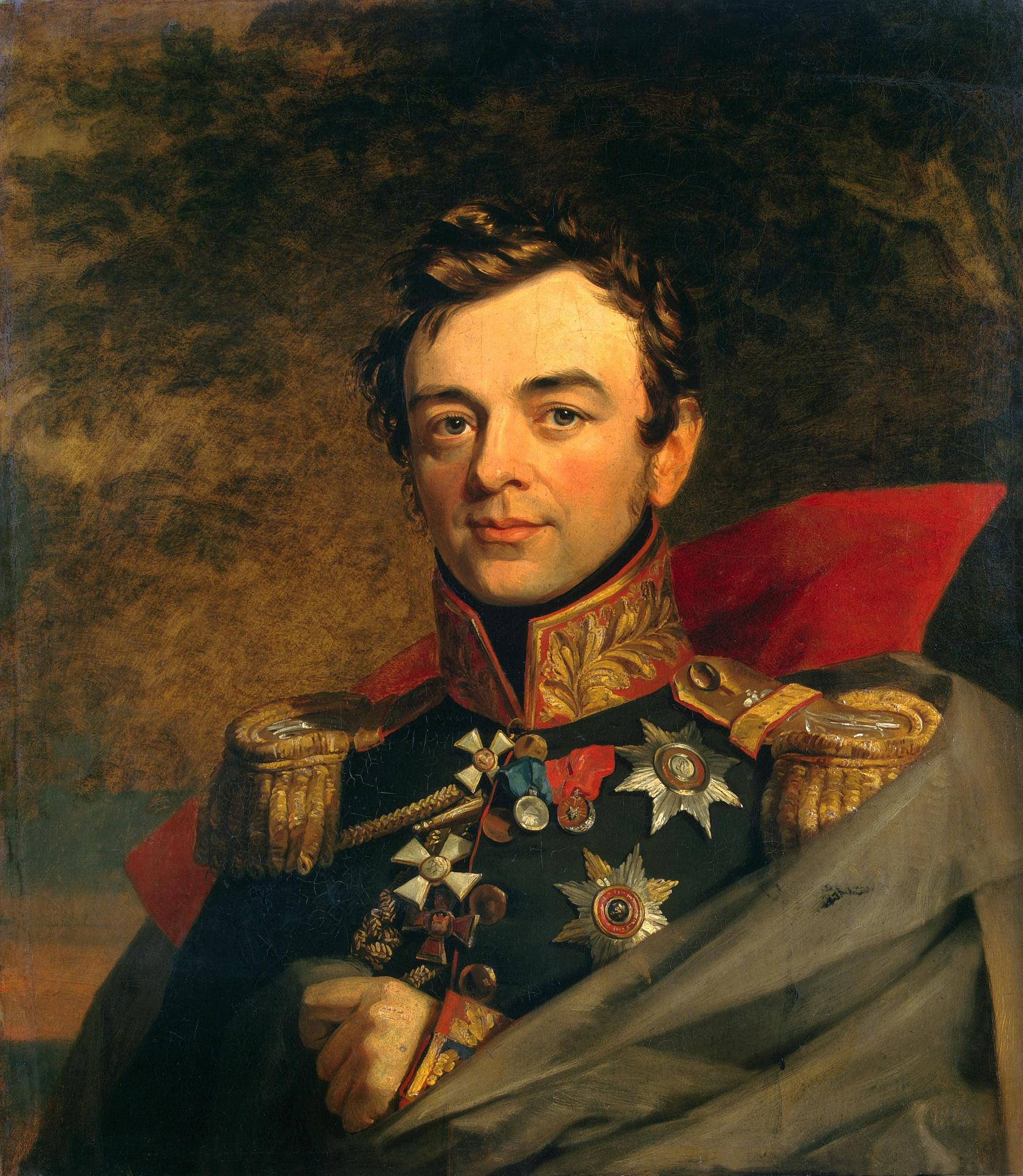
- Portrait by George Dawe (1823)
- Born: 19 May 1782; Poltava, Russian Empire (now Ukraine)
- Died: 1 February 1856 (aged 73); Warsaw, Congress Poland, Russian Empire
- Military career
- Allegiance: Russia
- Branch: Imperial Russian Army
- Service years: 1800–1856
- Rank: Field Marshal
- Conflicts: See list: ^{*taken from:}; Russo-Turkish War (1806–12); Capture of Jassy; Capture of Bucharest; Battle of Izmail (1809); Storming of Brăila; Battle of Brăila (1809); Battle of Rassowa; Battle of Tataritsa; Storming of Bazargic; Battle of Varna (1810); Battle of Shumen; Battle of Rusçuk (1810); Battle of Batin; Napoleonic Wars; Battle of Saltanovka; Battle of Smolensk; Battle of Borodino; Battle of Maloyaroslavets; Combat of Kolotskiy Monastery; Battle of Vyazma; Battle of Krasny; Siege of Modlin; Battle of Lützen; Battle of Bautzen; Battle of Gieshubl; Battle of Leipzig; Blockade of Magdeburg (1813); Siege of Hamburg; Battle of Laon; Battle of Arcis-sur-Aube; Storming of Paris; Russo-Persian War (1826–28); Battle of Elizabethpol; Capture of Echmiadzin; Capture of Erivan; Capture of Abbasabad; Battle of the Jevan-Bulak; Capture of Ardabil; Russo-Turkish War (1828–29); Siege of Kars; Battle of Akhaltsikhe; Battle of Erzerum Road; Battle of Milli-Duze; Battle of Khart; Battle of Bayburt; November Uprising; Siege of Warsaw; Hungarian Campaign; Third Battle of Komárom; Second Battle of Vác; Battle of Tura; Battle of Debrecen; Crimean War; Siege of Silistra
- Awards: Order of St. Andrew; Order of St. George; Order of St. Vladimir; Order of St. Anna; Order of St. Alexander Nevsky; Order of the White Eagle (Russian Empire); Gold Sword for Bravery

Signature
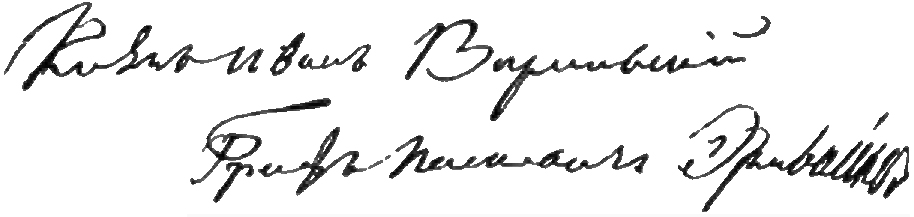

Count Ivan Fyodorovich Paskevich-Erevansky, Serene Prince of Warsaw (Note: Russian: Иван Фёдорович Паскевич-Эриванский, светлейший князь Варшавский, romanized: Ivan Fyodorovich Paskevich-Erivanskiy, svetleyshiy knyaz' Varshavskiy) (19 May [O.S. 8 May] 1782 – 1 February [O.S. 20 January] 1856) was a Russian military leader who was the namiestnik of Poland.

Paskevich is known for leading Russian forces in Poland during the November Uprising and for a series of leadership roles throughout the early and mid-19th century, such as the Russo-Persian War of 1826–1828, and the beginning phase of the Crimean War. In Russian history, he is remembered as a prominent military commander, rated on a par with Ivan Dibich-Zabalkansky, commander of the Russian armies during the same time.

Paskevich started as an officer during the Napoleonic Wars serving in the battles of Austerlitz and Borodino. After the war, he was a leader in the Russo-Persian War. He was made count of Yerevan in 1828. Afterwards, he became the namiestnik of Poland in 1831 after he crushed the Polish rebels in the November Uprising. He then helped crush the Hungarian Revolution of 1848. His last engagement was the Crimean War. Paskevich died in Warsaw in 1856.

He attained the rank of field marshal in the Russian army, and later in the Prussian and Austrian armies.

== Early life ==
Ivan Paskevich was born in Poltava on 19 May 1782. His father was of the Paskevich family of Zaporozhian Cossack gentry, while his mother was a Belarusian noblewoman. He was educated at the Page Corps, where his progress was rapid, and in 1800 received his commission in the Guards and was named aide-de-camp to the tsar.

== Early military career ==
=== Napoleonic Wars ===
His first active service was in 1805, in the auxiliary army sent to the assistance of Austria against France, when he took part in the Battle of Austerlitz, 2 December 1805, where Austrian – Russian troops were defeated by the French under Napoleon.

From 1807 to 1812, Ivan Paskevich was engaged in the campaigns against the Ottomans, and distinguished himself by many brilliant and daring exploits, being made a general officer in his thirtieth year. During the war with France in 1812–1814 he was in command of the 26th division of infantry, and he won promotion to the rank of lieutenant general. During and after Napoleon's invasion of Russia Paskevich was engaged in the battles of Borodino, Dresden, Leipzig, and Paris (1814).

Ivan Paskevich wrote a memoir of some of his experiences during the Napoleonic wars.

=== The 1820s and the Russo-Persian War ===
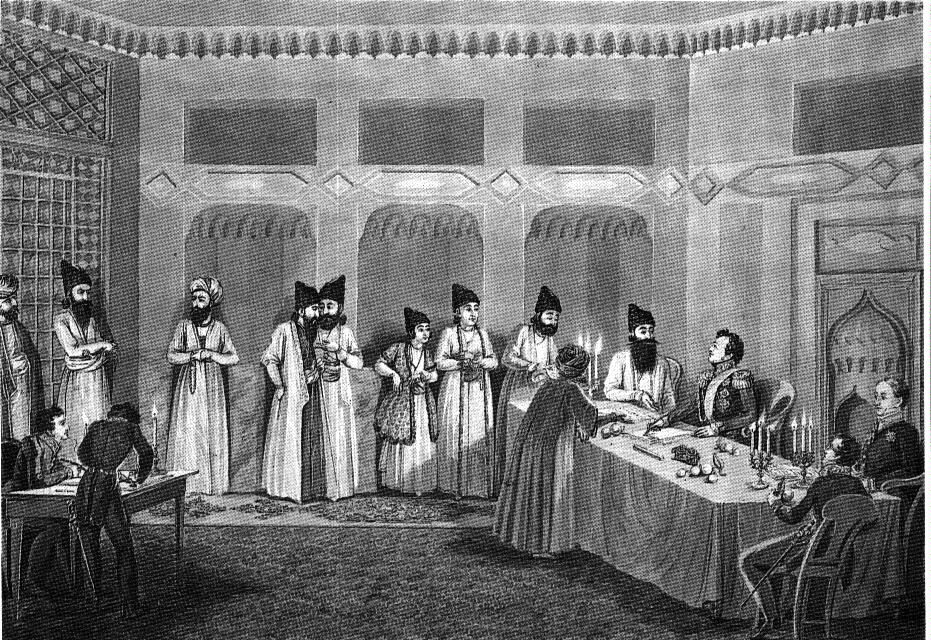
Paskevich with Abbas Mirza at the signing of the Treaty of Turkmenchay, 1828

Before the Russo-Persian War (1826–1828), then–Lieutenant General Paskevich was made commander of the 1st Guard Infantry. In the unit the brother of Tsar Alexander and future Tsar Nicholas I. This started a relationship that had the future Tsar calling Ivan Paskevich "father-Commander".

On the outbreak of Russo-Persian War in 1826 he was appointed second in command, and, in the spring of the following year he replaced Aleksey Petrovich Yermolov as chief command. Under his leadership, the Erivan and Nakhichevan Khanates were conquered from the Persians. After the Persians unsuccessfully tried to recapture Echmiadzin and its surroundings, the tsar granted Paskevich the title of "Erivanskii" (Count of Yerevan/Erevan), a million rubles and a diamond-mounted sword for his services. The Russo-Turkish War immediately followed and he successfully led the eastern or Caucasus front. For this he was made a Field Marshal at the age of forty-seven. In 1830, he was engaged in the Caucasian War on the territory of present-day Dagestan. At the same time he appointed the high-ranking Muslim cleric Mir-Fatah-Agha from Iran as head of the recently established Caucasus Committee. Paskevich hoped that by the help of Mir-Fatah's high stature in the Muslim community, he could make a very valuable contribution to the Russian consolidation of power in the Caucasus. Together with Mir-Fatah's high esteem among Muslims and his devised plans for the Caucasus, they managed to keep the entire Caucasus stable from rebellious Muslim insurrections for many years to come.

== Polish uprising and the Hungarian Revolution ==
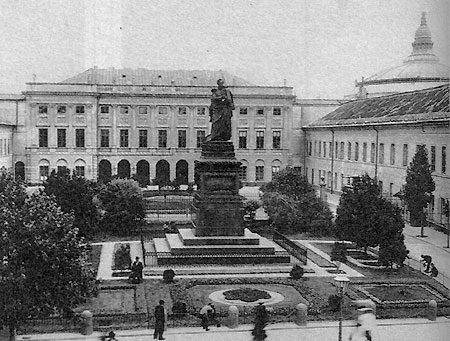
Viceregal Palace, Warsaw, with statue of Ivan Paskevich, before 1900

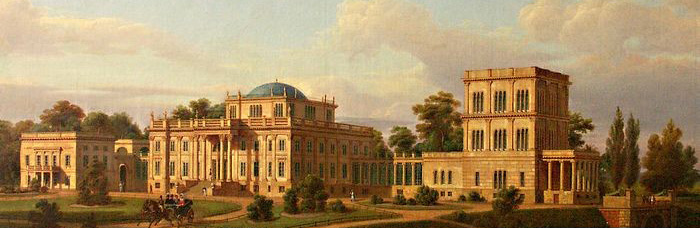
Paskevich Palace in Homyel, Belarus (as painted by Marcin Zaleski)

In June 1831, after the death of Field Marshal von Diebitsch, commander of Russian troops in Congress Poland, Paskevich was appointed his successor in crushing the Polish uprising. His armies, following the Battle of Ostrołęka in May, advanced slowly, but Paskevich redeemed his reputation at the Battle of Warsaw, giving a death blow to Polish hopes of restoring independence. He was created Prince of Warsaw and awarded the office of Namestnik of the Kingdom of Poland. With the kingdom's autonomy limited by the Organic Statute of the Kingdom of Poland, the period under Namestnik Paskevich – known in Poland as the "Paskevich Night" – became infamous for political repressions and economic sanctions, as well as for Russification. It was a policy of administrative unification of the Kingdom of Poland with the Russian Empire. There he also promoted the development of industry, the construction of highways, railways and military fortresses. With Paskevich's participation, a decree was prepared in 1846, which prohibited the arbitrary removal by landlords of peasants, who had more than 3 morgen (1.7 hectares), from the land, the reduction or change of their plots, and abolished darmocha (duties in favour of landlords over and above barshchina and obrok ('levies')), forced hiring, tribute, and a number of other duties.

On the outbreak of the Hungarian Revolution of 1848 he was appointed to command the Russian troops sent to aid Austria, and finally compelled the Hungarians' surrender at Világos.

== Late career ==
In 1854 Paskevich took command of the Army of the Danube, which was then engaging the Turks in the initial stage of the conflict which evolved into the Crimean War. Though he laid siege to Silistria, Paskevich advocated aborting the campaign due to Austria's threat to intervene in the war. On 9 June he suffered a combat injury and was compelled to return to Russia, handing command of the army to General Mikhail Dmitrievich Gorchakov. Paskevich died in Warsaw, where in 1870 a memorial was erected to him before the Koniecpolski Palace. It was demolished in October 1917 by the Poles. His remains were reburied by his son in the family mausoleum on the grounds of the Homel Palace. Both Paskevich's titles, Prince of Warsaw and Count of Erevan, went extinct with the death of his only son Lt. Gen. Fedor Paskevich in 1903.

== Gallery ==
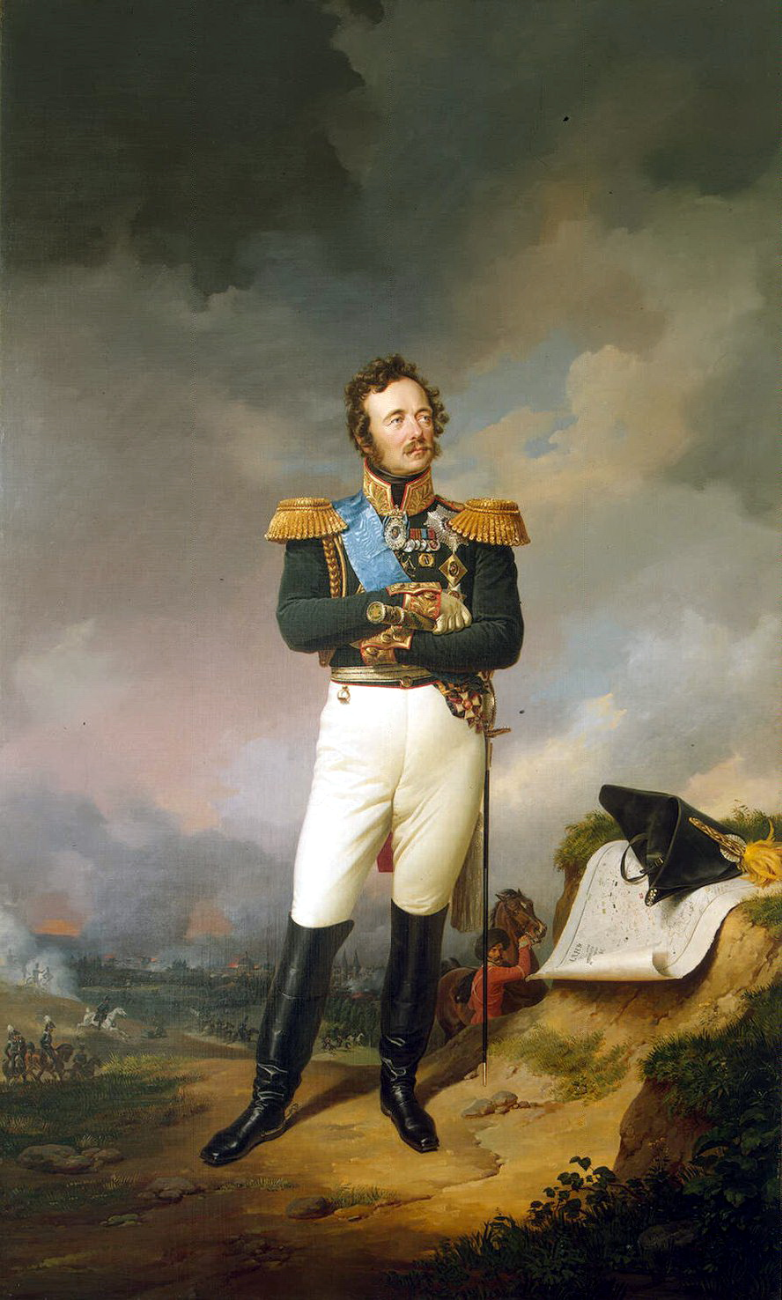
Portrait by Franz Krüger in 1834, Hermitage

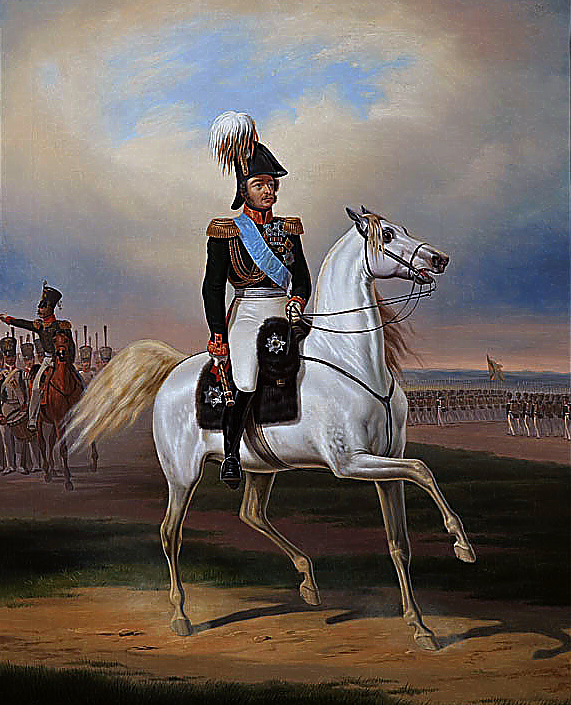
Equestrian portrait by January Suchodolski c. 1841, National Museum in Warsaw

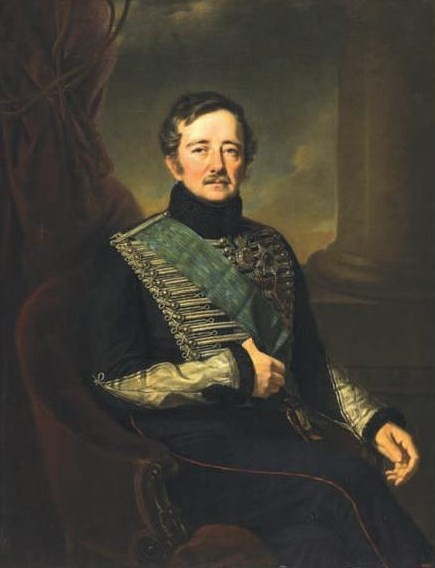
Portrait by Jan Ksawery Kaniewski in 1849

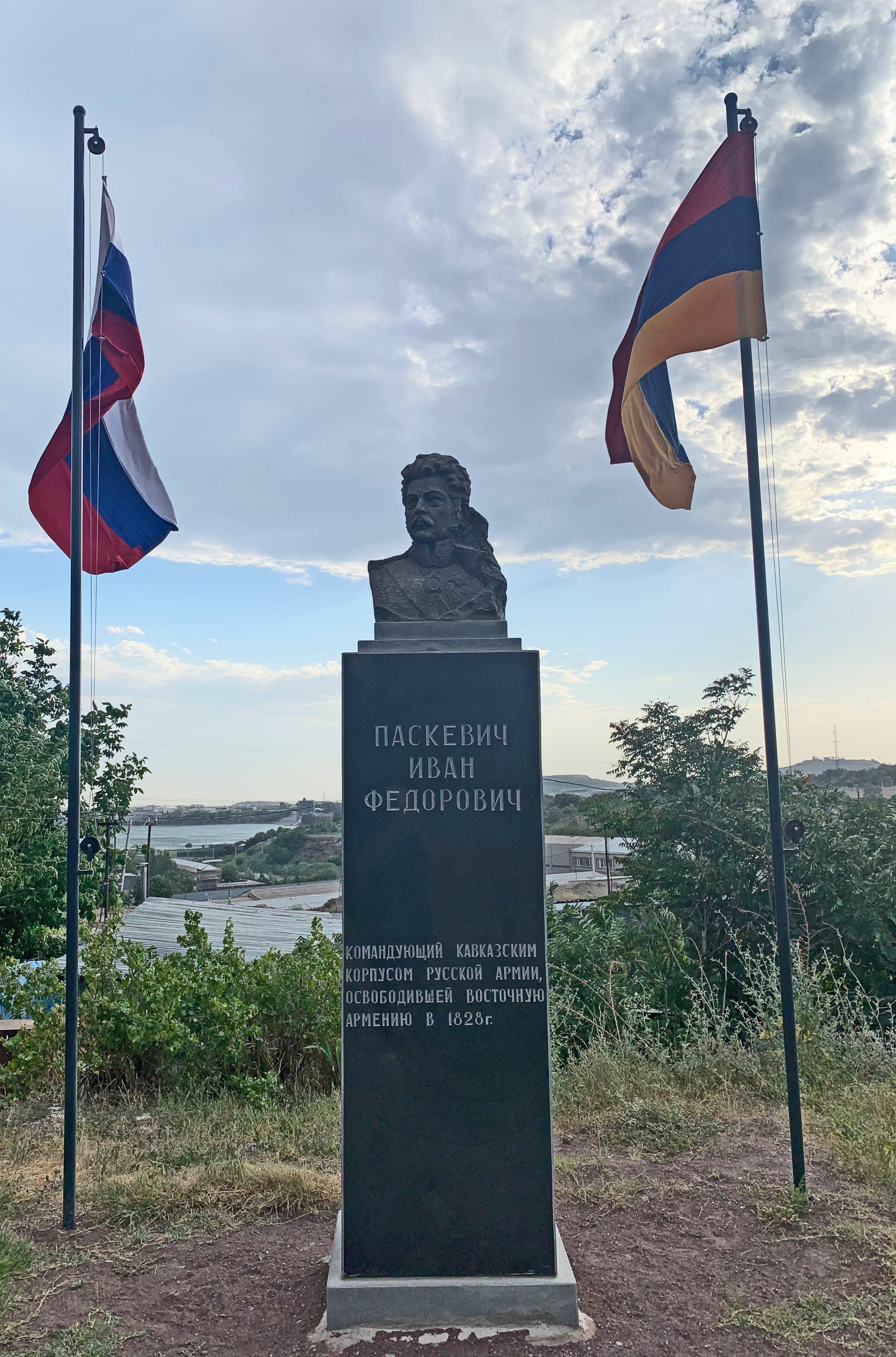
Monument to Paskevich in Yerevan, Armenia
